= Lists of the United States Congress =

This is an incomplete list of lists pertaining to the United States Congress.

== Sessions ==
- List of United States Congresses

== Leaders ==
=== House of Representatives ===
- List of speakers of the United States House of Representatives
  - Elections
- Party leaders of the United States House of Representatives
  - House Democratic Caucus
    - Leaders
    - Chairs
    - Vice chairs
    - Secretaries
  - House Republican Conference
    - Leaders
    - Chairs
    - Vice chairs
    - Secretaries
- List of deans of the United States House of Representatives

=== Senate ===
- List of presidents pro tempore of the United States Senate
- Party leaders of the United States Senate
  - Current party leaders
  - Senate Democratic Caucus
    - Chairs and leaders
    - Vice chairs
    - Secretaries
    - Policy chairs
  - Senate Republican Conference
    - Leaders
    - Chairs
    - Secretaries and vice chairs
    - Policy chairs
- List of deans of the United States Senate
- List of presiding officers of the United States Senate

== Members ==
- Current members of the United States Congress
- List of historical longest-serving members of the United States Congress
- List of members of the United States Congress by brevity of service
- List of members of the United States Congress by longevity of service
- List of members of the United States Congress from multiple states
- List of members of the United States Congress killed or wounded in office
- List of members of the United States Congress who died in office
- List of members of the United States Congress who owned slaves
- Lists of new members of the United States Congress

=== House of Representatives ===
- List of current United States representatives
- List of former United States representatives
- List of United States representatives-elect who never took their seats
- List of United States representatives expelled, censured, or reprimanded
- List of United States representatives who lost re-election in a primary
- List of United States representatives who served a single term
- List of United States representatives who switched parties

==== Seniority ====
- Seniority in the United States House of Representatives
- List of United States representatives in the 1st Congress
- List of United States representatives in the 2nd Congress
- List of United States representatives in the 3rd Congress
- List of United States representatives in the 4th Congress
- List of United States representatives in the 5th Congress
- List of United States representatives in the 6th Congress
- List of United States representatives in the 7th Congress
- List of United States representatives in the 8th Congress
- List of United States representatives in the 9th Congress
- List of United States representatives in the 10th Congress
- List of United States representatives in the 11th Congress
- List of United States representatives in the 12th Congress
- List of United States representatives in the 13th Congress
- List of United States representatives in the 14th Congress
- List of United States representatives in the 15th Congress
- List of United States representatives in the 16th Congress
- List of United States representatives in the 17th Congress
- List of United States representatives in the 18th Congress
- List of United States representatives in the 19th Congress
- List of United States representatives in the 20th Congress
- List of United States representatives in the 21st Congress
- List of United States representatives in the 22nd Congress
- List of United States representatives in the 23rd Congress
- List of United States representatives in the 24th Congress
- List of United States representatives in the 25th Congress
- List of United States representatives in the 26th Congress
- List of United States representatives in the 27th Congress
- List of United States representatives in the 28th Congress
- List of United States representatives in the 29th Congress
- List of United States representatives in the 30th Congress
- List of United States representatives in the 31st Congress
- List of United States representatives in the 32nd Congress
- List of United States representatives in the 33rd Congress
- List of United States representatives in the 34th Congress
- List of United States representatives in the 35th Congress
- List of United States representatives in the 36th Congress
- List of United States representatives in the 37th Congress
- List of United States representatives in the 38th Congress
- List of United States representatives in the 39th Congress
- List of United States representatives in the 40th Congress
- List of United States representatives in the 41st Congress
- List of United States representatives in the 42nd Congress
- List of United States representatives in the 43rd Congress
- List of United States representatives in the 44th Congress
- List of United States representatives in the 45th Congress
- List of United States representatives in the 46th Congress
- List of United States representatives in the 47th Congress
- List of United States representatives in the 48th Congress
- List of United States representatives in the 49th Congress
- List of United States representatives in the 50th Congress
- List of United States representatives in the 51st Congress
- List of United States representatives in the 52nd Congress
- List of United States representatives in the 53rd Congress
- List of United States representatives in the 54th Congress
- List of United States representatives in the 55th Congress
- List of United States representatives in the 56th Congress
- List of United States representatives in the 57th Congress
- List of United States representatives in the 58th Congress
- List of United States representatives in the 59th Congress
- List of United States representatives in the 60th Congress
- List of United States representatives in the 61st Congress
- List of United States representatives in the 62nd Congress
- List of United States representatives in the 63rd Congress
- List of United States representatives in the 64th Congress
- List of United States representatives in the 65th Congress
- List of United States representatives in the 66th Congress
- List of United States representatives in the 67th Congress
- List of United States representatives in the 68th Congress
- List of United States representatives in the 69th Congress
- List of United States representatives in the 70th Congress
- List of United States representatives in the 71st Congress
- List of United States representatives in the 72nd Congress
- List of United States representatives in the 73rd Congress
- List of United States representatives in the 74th Congress
- List of United States representatives in the 75th Congress
- List of United States representatives in the 76th Congress
- List of United States representatives in the 77th Congress
- List of United States representatives in the 78th Congress
- List of United States representatives in the 79th Congress
- List of United States representatives in the 80th Congress
- List of United States representatives in the 81st Congress
- List of United States representatives in the 82nd Congress
- List of United States representatives in the 83rd Congress
- List of United States representatives in the 84th Congress
- List of United States representatives in the 85th Congress
- List of United States representatives in the 86th Congress
- List of United States representatives in the 87th Congress
- List of United States representatives in the 88th Congress
- List of United States representatives in the 89th Congress
- List of United States representatives in the 90th Congress
- List of United States representatives in the 91st Congress
- List of United States representatives in the 92nd Congress
- List of United States representatives in the 93rd Congress
- List of United States representatives in the 94th Congress
- List of United States representatives in the 95th Congress
- List of United States representatives in the 96th Congress
- List of United States representatives in the 97th Congress
- List of United States representatives in the 98th Congress
- List of United States representatives in the 99th Congress
- List of United States representatives in the 100th Congress
- List of United States representatives in the 101st Congress
- List of United States representatives in the 102nd Congress
- List of United States representatives in the 103rd Congress
- List of United States representatives in the 104th Congress
- List of United States representatives in the 105th Congress
- List of United States representatives in the 106th Congress
- List of United States representatives in the 107th Congress
- List of United States representatives in the 108th Congress
- List of United States representatives in the 109th Congress
- List of United States representatives in the 110th Congress
- List of United States representatives in the 111th Congress
- List of United States representatives in the 112th Congress
- List of United States representatives in the 113th Congress
- List of United States representatives in the 114th Congress
- List of United States representatives in the 115th Congress
- List of United States representatives in the 116th Congress
- List of United States representatives in the 117th Congress
- List of United States representatives in the 118th Congress

=== Senate ===
- Classes of United States senators
- List of appointed United States senators
- List of current United States senators
- List of former United States senators
- List of United States senators expelled or censured
- List of United States senators who switched parties

==== Seniority ====
- Seniority in the United States Senate
- List of United States senators in the 1st Congress
- List of United States senators in the 2nd Congress
- List of United States senators in the 3rd Congress
- List of United States senators in the 4th Congress
- List of United States senators in the 5th Congress
- List of United States senators in the 6th Congress
- List of United States senators in the 7th Congress
- List of United States senators in the 8th Congress
- List of United States senators in the 9th Congress
- List of United States senators in the 10th Congress
- List of United States senators in the 11th Congress
- List of United States senators in the 12th Congress
- List of United States senators in the 13th Congress
- List of United States senators in the 14th Congress
- List of United States senators in the 15th Congress
- List of United States senators in the 16th Congress
- List of United States senators in the 17th Congress
- List of United States senators in the 18th Congress
- List of United States senators in the 19th Congress
- List of United States senators in the 20th Congress
- List of United States senators in the 21st Congress
- List of United States senators in the 22nd Congress
- List of United States senators in the 23rd Congress
- List of United States senators in the 24th Congress
- List of United States senators in the 25th Congress
- List of United States senators in the 26th Congress
- List of United States senators in the 27th Congress
- List of United States senators in the 28th Congress
- List of United States senators in the 29th Congress
- List of United States senators in the 30th Congress
- List of United States senators in the 31st Congress
- List of United States senators in the 32nd Congress
- List of United States senators in the 33rd Congress
- List of United States senators in the 34th Congress
- List of United States senators in the 35th Congress
- List of United States senators in the 36th Congress
- List of United States senators in the 37th Congress
- List of United States senators in the 38th Congress
- List of United States senators in the 39th Congress
- List of United States senators in the 40th Congress
- List of United States senators in the 41st Congress
- List of United States senators in the 42nd Congress
- List of United States senators in the 43rd Congress
- List of United States senators in the 44th Congress
- List of United States senators in the 45th Congress
- List of United States senators in the 46th Congress
- List of United States senators in the 47th Congress
- List of United States senators in the 48th Congress
- List of United States senators in the 49th Congress
- List of United States senators in the 50th Congress
- List of United States senators in the 51st Congress
- List of United States senators in the 52nd Congress
- List of United States senators in the 53rd Congress
- List of United States senators in the 54th Congress
- List of United States senators in the 55th Congress
- List of United States senators in the 56th Congress
- List of United States senators in the 57th Congress
- List of United States senators in the 58th Congress
- List of United States senators in the 59th Congress
- List of United States senators in the 60th Congress
- List of United States senators in the 61st Congress
- List of United States senators in the 62nd Congress
- List of United States senators in the 63rd Congress
- List of United States senators in the 64th Congress
- List of United States senators in the 65th Congress
- List of United States senators in the 66th Congress
- List of United States senators in the 67th Congress
- List of United States senators in the 68th Congress
- List of United States senators in the 69th Congress
- List of United States senators in the 70th Congress
- List of United States senators in the 71st Congress
- List of United States senators in the 72nd Congress
- List of United States senators in the 73rd Congress
- List of United States senators in the 74th Congress
- List of United States senators in the 75th Congress
- List of United States senators in the 76th Congress
- List of United States senators in the 77th Congress
- List of United States senators in the 78th Congress
- List of United States senators in the 79th Congress
- List of United States senators in the 80th Congress
- List of United States senators in the 81st Congress
- List of United States senators in the 82nd Congress
- List of United States senators in the 83rd Congress
- List of United States senators in the 84th Congress
- List of United States senators in the 85th Congress
- List of United States senators in the 86th Congress
- List of United States senators in the 87th Congress
- List of United States senators in the 88th Congress
- List of United States senators in the 89th Congress
- List of United States senators in the 90th Congress
- List of United States senators in the 91st Congress
- List of United States senators in the 92nd Congress
- List of United States senators in the 93rd Congress
- List of United States senators in the 94th Congress
- List of United States senators in the 95th Congress
- List of United States senators in the 96th Congress
- List of United States senators in the 97th Congress
- List of United States senators in the 98th Congress
- List of United States senators in the 99th Congress
- List of United States senators in the 100th Congress
- List of United States senators in the 101st Congress
- List of United States senators in the 102nd Congress
- List of United States senators in the 103rd Congress
- List of United States senators in the 104th Congress
- List of United States senators in the 105th Congress
- List of United States senators in the 106th Congress
- List of United States senators in the 107th Congress
- List of United States senators in the 108th Congress
- List of United States senators in the 109th Congress
- List of United States senators in the 110th Congress
- List of United States senators in the 111th Congress
- List of United States senators in the 112th Congress
- List of United States senators in the 113th Congress
- List of United States senators in the 114th Congress
- List of United States senators in the 115th Congress
- List of United States senators in the 116th Congress
- List of United States senators in the 117th Congress
- List of United States senators in the 118th Congress

=== Jurisdictions ===
==== States ====
Congressional delegations	U.S. representatives	U.S. senators
Alabama	Alabama	Alabama
Alaska	Alaska	Alaska
Arizona	Arizona	Arizona
Arkansas	Arkansas	Arkansas
California	California	California
Colorado	Colorado	Colorado
Connecticut	Connecticut	Connecticut
Delaware	Delaware	Delaware
Florida	Florida	Florida
Georgia	Georgia	Georgia
Hawaii	Hawaii	Hawaii
Idaho	Idaho	Idaho
Illinois	Illinois	Illinois
Indiana	Indiana	Indiana
Iowa	Iowa	Iowa
Kansas	Kansas	Kansas
Kentucky	Kentucky	Kentucky
Louisiana	Louisiana	Louisiana
Maine	Maine	Maine
Maryland	Maryland	Maryland
Massachusetts	Massachusetts	Massachusetts
Michigan	Michigan	Michigan
Minnesota	Minnesota	Minnesota
Mississippi	Mississippi	Mississippi
Missouri	Missouri	Missouri
Montana	Montana	Montana
Nebraska	Nebraska	Nebraska
Nevada	Nevada	Nevada
New Hampshire	New Hampshire	New Hampshire
New Jersey	New Jersey	New Jersey
New Mexico	New Mexico	New Mexico
New York	New York	New York
North Carolina	North Carolina	North Carolina
North Dakota	North Dakota	North Dakota
Ohio	Ohio	Ohio
Oklahoma	Oklahoma	Oklahoma
Oregon	Oregon	Oregon
Pennsylvania	Pennsylvania	Pennsylvania
Rhode Island	Rhode Island	Rhode Island
South Carolina	South Carolina	South Carolina
South Dakota	South Dakota	South Dakota
Tennessee	Tennessee	Tennessee
Texas	Texas	Texas
Utah	Utah	Utah
Vermont	Vermont	Vermont
Virginia	Virginia	Virginia
Washington	Washington	Washington
West Virginia	West Virginia	West Virginia
Wisconsin	Wisconsin	Wisconsin
Wyoming	Wyoming	Wyoming

==== Others ====
Congressional delegations	U.S. representatives	U.S. senators
American Samoa	N/A	N/A
District of Columbia	District of Columbia (shadow)	District of Columbia (shadow)
Guam	N/A	N/A
Puerto Rico	Puerto Rico (shadow)	Puerto Rico (shadow)
U.S. Virgin Islands	N/A	N/A

==== Obsolete ====
Congressional delegations
Dakota Territory
Northwest Territory
Philippines
Southwest Territory

== Groups ==
- African Americans in the United States Congress
- List of Arab and Middle Eastern Americans in the United States Congress
- List of Asian Americans and Pacific Islands Americans in the United States Congress
- List of Buddhist members of the United States Congress
- List of Hindu members of the United States Congress
- List of Hispanic and Latino Americans in the United States Congress
- List of Jewish members of the United States Congress
- List of LGBTQ members of the United States Congress
- List of Mormon members of the United States Congress
- List of Muslim members of the United States Congress
- List of Native Americans in the United States Congress
- List of Quaker members of the United States Congress
- List of youngest members of the United States Congress
- List of physically disabled American politicians

=== House of Representatives ===
- List of African-American United States representatives
- Women in the United States House of Representatives

=== Senate ===
- List of African-American United States senators
- List of United States senators born outside the United States
- Women in the United States Senate

== Agencies, employees, and offices ==
- Architects of the Capitol
- Comptrollers general of the United States
- Librarians of Congress
  - Registers of copyrights
  - United States poets laureate

=== House of Representatives ===
- Chaplains
- Chief administrative officers
- Clerks
- Doorkeepers
- Historians
- Parliamentarians
- Postmasters
- Reading clerks
- Sergeants at arms

=== Senate ===
- Chaplains
- Curators
- Historians
- Librarians
- Parliamentarians
- Secretaries
- Sergeants at arms and doorkeepers

== Politics, places, and procedure ==
- Caucuses of the United States Congress
- Congressional office buildings
- Joint session of the United States Congress
  - List of joint sessions of the United States Congress
- List of congressional opponents of the Vietnam War
- List of United States congressional districts
- List of United States federal legislation
- United States congressional committee
  - List of defunct United States congressional committees
  - List of United States congressional joint committees
- Party divisions of United States Congresses
  - Third-party and independent members of the United States Congress

=== House of Representatives ===
- List of United States House of Representatives committees

=== Senate ===
- List of United States Senate committees
- List of tie-breaking votes cast by vice presidents of the United States
