= Teter =

Teter may refer to:

== People ==
- Teter (surname)

== Geography ==
- Teter, West Virginia, United States, an unincorporated community
- Teter Creek, West Virginia

== See also ==
- Teter Myers French House, Hedgesville, West Virginia, a mansion built by Teter French in 1860, on the National Register of Historic Places
- Charlene Teters (born 1952), Native American artist, educator and lecturer
- Teeter or Teater, a surname
