= Teter (surname) =

Teter is a surname, and may refer to:

- F. B. Teter (1873–1922), American politician
- Hannah Teter (born 1987), American snowboarder
- Lucky Teter (1901–1942), American stunt driver
- Nicole Teter (born 1973), American middle-distance runner

== See also ==
- Teeter, surname
