= Teeters =

Teeters is a surname. Notable people with the surname include:

- John Teeters (born 1993), American sprinter
- Matt Teeters (born 1983), American politician
- Nancy Teeters (1930–2014), American economist

== See also ==
- Teeter (disambiguation)
