= List of physically disabled American politicians =

The following is a list of politicians who hold or held office while having a physical disability.

== President ==
President		Physical disability	Party	State	Tenure			Notes
Portrait	Name (lifespan)	Physical disability	Party	State	Term start	Term end	Length of service	Notes
	Theodore Roosevelt (1858–1919)	Visual impairment	Republican	New York	September 14, 1901	March 4, 1909	7 years, 171 days	Blind in one eye after a boxing accident
	Woodrow Wilson (1856–1924)	Hemiparesis	Democratic	New Jersey	March 4, 1913	March 4, 1921	8 years, 0 days	Partially paralyzed due to a stroke
	Franklin D. Roosevelt (1882–1945)	Paralysis	Democratic	New York	March 4, 1933	April 12, 1945	12 years, 39 days	Paraplegic due to either polio or Guillain–Barré syndrome

== U.S. Senate ==
Senator		Physical disability	Party	State	Tenure			Notes
Portrait	Name (lifespan)	Physical disability	Party	State	Term start	Term end	Length of service	Notes
	Parson Brownlow (1805–1877)	Degenerative disease, unspecified		Tennessee	March 4, 1869	March 3, 1875	5 years, 364 days	Progressive "palsy" that impeded his speech, caused tremors, partial paralysis
	Benjamin Tillman (1847–1918)	Anophthalmia	Democratic	South Carolina	March 4, 1895	July 3, 1918	23 years, 121 days	Lost eye due to cancer
	Thomas D. Schall	Legally blind	Republican	Minnesota				Blinded by an electrical shock from a cigar lighter
	Thomas Gore (1870–1949)	Blindness	Democratic	Oklahoma	December 11, 1907; March 4, 1931	March 4, 1921; January 3, 1937		Blind from childhood accidents
	Charles E. Potter (1916–1979)	Amputee	Republican	Michigan	November 5, 1952	January 3, 1959	6 years, 59 days	Amputee, lost legs in World War II
	John Porter East (1931–1986)	Paraplegia	Republican	North Carolina				Paraplegic due to polio contracted in 1955
	Bob Dole	Limited mobility	Republican	Kansas				Injured arm in World War II
	Bob Kerrey	Amputee	Democratic	Nebraska				Lost one leg below the knee due to combat injury in the Vietnam War
	Max Cleland	Amputee	Demcoratic	Georgia				Triple amputee, both legs and one arm, due to a grenade blast in the Vietnam War
	Daniel Inouye	Amputee	Democratic	Hawaii	January 3, 1963	November 17, 2012	49 years, 319 days	Lost his right arm due to grenade shrapnel in World War II
	Mark Kirk	Stroke	Republican	Illinois	November 29, 2010	January 3, 2017	6 years, 35 days	Had a stroke in 2012, but recovered after nearly a year and a half after receiving physical therapy
	John McCain	Limited Mobility	Republican	Arizona	January 3, 1987	August 25, 2018	31 years, 234 days	Limited use of arms and "off-kilter gait" due to torture as a prisoner of war during the Vietnam War
	Patrick Leahy	Legally blind	Democratic	Vermont	January 3, 1975	January 3, 2023	48 years, 0 days	Legally blind in his left eye from birth
	Jon Tester	Amputee	Democratic	Montana	January 3, 2007	January 3, 2025	18 years, 0 days	Lost three fingers in a meat grinding accident
	Mitch McConnell	Paralysis	Republican	Kentucky	41 years, 322 days	Incumbent	41 years, 322 days	Upper left leg was paralyzed by a polio attack at age two, but recovered after receiving treatment and physical therapy
	Tammy Duckworth	Amputee	Democratic	Illinois	January 3, 2017	Incumbent	9 years, 322 days	Lost both of her legs and damaged her right arm due to a rocket propelled grenade attack in the Iraq War

=== Senator-elect ===
Picture	Name	Disability	Party	State	Office(s)	Notes
	Josh Turek	Spina bifida	Democratic	Iowa	Iowa Representative	Was born with spina bifida and has been a wheelchair user since childhood

== U.S. House ==
Representative		Physical disability	Party	State	Tenure			Notes
Portrait	Name (lifespan)	Physical disability	Party	State	Term start	Term end	Length of service	Notes
	Adam Huntsman (1786–1849)	Amputee	Democratic	Tennessee				Amputee, had a wooden leg; electoral opponent Davy Crockett called him a "timber toe"
	Roswell P. Bishop	Amputee	Republican	Michigan				Amputee; right arm injured by Minié ball at Siege of Yorktown (1862)
	Arthur L. Miller (1892–1967)	Amputee	Republican	Nebraska				Double amputee; legs injured in 1934 hunting accident
	William J. Miller (1899–1950)	Amputee	Republican	Connecticut				Double amputee; legs injured in plane crash in France during World War I
	Arthur Aleshire	Paraplegia	Democratic	Ohio				Due to an accident in 1923, lost the use of his legs
	Mo Udall	Anophthalmia	Democratic	Arizona				Lost his right eye in a childhood accident
	Tony Coelho	Epilepsy	Democratic	California				
	Jim Langevin	Quadriplegic	Democratic	Rhode Island				Injured in an accidental shooting when 16
	Brian Mast	Amputee	Republican	Florida		Incumbent		Lost both his legs and one of his fingers when he stepped on an IED in Kandahar
	Jim Baird	Amputee	Republican	Indiana		Incumbent		Lost his left arm during a combat injury in the Vietnam War
	Madison Cawthorn	Paraplegia	Republican	North Carolina				Lost use of his legs in a car accident in 2014
	Dan Crenshaw	Anophthalmia	Republican	Texas		Incumbent		Lost right eye due to an IED attack in Afghanistan
	Lateefah Simon	Legally blind	Democratic	California		Incumbent		Blind

== Governor ==
Governor		Physical disability	Party	State	Tenure			Notes
Portrait	Name (lifespan)	Physical disability	Party	State	Term start	Term end	Length of service	Notes
	Harry Kelly	Amputee	Republican	Michigan				Lost his right leg in World War I
	John Swainson	Amputee	Democratic	Michigan				Lost both legs due to a land mine in World War II
	George Wallace	Paraplegia	Democratic	Alabama				Paraplegic due to a bullet wound sustained in a 1972 assassination attempt
	David Paterson	Legally blind	Democratic	New York				Legally blind from birth
	Greg Abbott	Paraplegia	Republican	Texas		Incumbent		Paraplegic due to a 1984 accident when a falling oak tree hit him in the back

== State legislators ==
Name	Party	State	Office(s)	Notes
Anita Lee Blair	Democratic	Texas	Member of the Texas House of Representatives	Blind, lost sight due to a car accident in 1936.
F. B. Teter	Republican	Washington	Washington Representative	Blind
Marshall H. Twitchell	Republican	Louisiana	Louisiana Senator	Both arms amputated after an assassination attempt in 1876.
Marianna Davis	Democratic	Idaho	Idaho Representative	A skiing accident at the age of 16 left her paralyzed from the chest down
Oramel B. Fuller	Republican	Michigan	Michigan Legislator	Paraplegic due to accidental fall
Chuck Graham	Democratic	Missouri	Missouri Legislator	Paraplegic after being involved in an automobile accident at 16
Aaron Kaufman	Democratic	Maryland	Member of the Maryland House of Delegates	has cerebral palsy
Arlon Lindner	Republican	Minnesota	Minnesota Representative	Lost parts of two fingers in an accident
Robert Mahoney	Democratic	Minnesota	Minnesota Representative	Blind
Doug Spade	Democratic	Michigan	Michigan Representative	Blind
Allen B. Morse	Democratic	Michigan	Michigan Senator	Amputee, lost his left arm storming Missionary Ridge in 1863

== Other ==
Name	Party	State	Office(s)	Notes
John F. Collins	Democratic	Massachusetts	Mayor of Boston	Both he and his children contracted polio
Kristen Cox	Republican	Maryland	2006 Republican nominee for Lieutenant Governor of Maryland	Blind from Stargardt disease
Rahm Emanuel	Democratic	Illinois	Chief of Staff to the President of the United States; Mayor of Chicago	Lost most of his right middle finger to amputation in his adolescence after a meat slicer accident and subsequent infection
Cyrus Habib	Democratic	Washington	Lieutenant Governor of Washington	Blind due to childhood cancer
Charles H. Manly	Democratic	Michigan	Mayor of Ann Arbor	Amputee; left arm injured on first day of Battle of Gettysburg; [also was a Michigan state legislator]
Nicholas Sposato	Democratic (before 2017)	Illinois	Chicago City Council	Wheelchair user with multiple sclerosis
Nicholas Sposato	Independent (2017–present)	Illinois	Chicago City Council	Wheelchair user with multiple sclerosis
