= List of United States representatives in the 71st Congress =

This is a complete list of United States representatives during the 71st United States Congress listed by seniority.

As an historical article, the districts and party affiliations listed reflect those during the 71st Congress (March 4, 1929 – March 3, 1931). Seats and party affiliations on similar lists for other congresses will be different for certain members.

Seniority depends on the date on which members were sworn into office. Since many members are sworn in on the same day, subsequent ranking is based on previous congressional service of the individual and then by alphabetical order by the last name of the representative.

Committee chairmanship in the House is often associated with seniority. However, party leadership is typically not associated with seniority.

Note: The "*" indicates that the representative/delegate may have served one or more non-consecutive terms while in the House of Representatives of the United States Congress.

== U.S. House seniority list ==
U.S. House seniority
Rank	Representative	Party	District	Seniority date (Previous service, if any)	No. of term(s)	Notes
1	Gilbert N. Haugen	R	IA-04	March 4, 1899	16th term	Dean of the House
2	Edward W. Pou	D	NC-04	March 4, 1901	15th term	
3	John Nance Garner	D	TX-15	March 4, 1903	14th term	
4	Thomas Montgomery Bell	D	GA-09	March 4, 1905	13th term	Left the House in 1931.
5	Willis C. Hawley	R	OR-01	March 4, 1907	12th term	
6	James C. McLaughlin	R	MI-09	March 4, 1907	12th term	
7	Adolph J. Sabath	D	IL-05	March 4, 1907	12th term	
8	Joseph W. Byrns Sr.	D	TN-06	March 4, 1909	11th term	
9	James W. Collier	D	MS-08	March 4, 1909	11th term	
10	William Walton Griest	R	PA-10	March 4, 1909	11th term	Died on December 5, 1929.
11	Edward T. Taylor	D	CO-04	March 4, 1909	11th term	
12	Robert L. Doughton	D	NC-09	March 4, 1911	10th term	
13	John Charles Linthicum	D	MD-04	March 4, 1911	10th term	
14	Stephen G. Porter	R	PA-32	March 4, 1911	10th term	Died on June 27, 1930.
15	Charles M. Stedman	D	NC-05	March 4, 1911	10th term	Died on September 23, 1930.
16	James Benjamin Aswell	D	LA-08	March 4, 1913	9th term	
17	Frederick A. Britten	R	IL-09	March 4, 1913	9th term	
18	Edward E. Browne	R	WI-08	March 4, 1913	9th term	Left the House in 1931.
19	John F. Carew	D	NY-18	March 4, 1913	9th term	Resigned on December 28, 1929.
20	Louis C. Cramton	R	MI-07	March 4, 1913	9th term	Left the House in 1931.
21	Charles R. Crisp	D	GA-03	March 4, 1913; Previous service, 1896–1897.	10th term*	
22	Charles F. Curry	R	CA-03	March 4, 1913	9th term	Died on October 10, 1930.
23	James A. Frear	R	WI-10	March 4, 1913	9th term	
24	George Scott Graham	R	PA-02	March 4, 1913	9th term	
25	Albert Johnson	R	WA-03	March 4, 1913	9th term	
26	Edgar Raymond Kiess	R	PA-16	March 4, 1913	9th term	Died on July 20, 1930.
27	Carl E. Mapes	R	MI-05	March 4, 1913	9th term	
28	Andrew Jackson Montague	D	VA-03	March 4, 1913	9th term	
29	James S. Parker	R	NY-29	March 4, 1913	9th term	
30	Percy Quin	D	MS-07	March 4, 1913	9th term	
31	Sam Rayburn	D	TX-04	March 4, 1913	9th term	
32	Addison T. Smith	R	ID-02	March 4, 1913	9th term	
33	Hatton W. Sumners	D	TX-05	March 4, 1913	9th term	
34	Allen T. Treadway	R	MA-01	March 4, 1913	9th term	
35	Otis Wingo	D	AR-04	March 4, 1913	9th term	Died on October 21, 1930.
36	James P. Buchanan	D	TX-10	April 15, 1913	9th term	
37	Carl Vinson	D	GA-10	November 3, 1914	9th term	
38	Edward B. Almon	D	AL-08	March 4, 1915	8th term	
39	Isaac Bacharach	R	NJ-02	March 4, 1915	8th term	
40	John G. Cooper	R	OH-19	March 4, 1915	8th term	
41	George P. Darrow	R	PA-07	March 4, 1915	8th term	
42	S. Wallace Dempsey	R	NY-40	March 4, 1915	8th term	Left the House in 1931.
43	Edward E. Denison	R	IL-25	March 4, 1915	8th term	Left the House in 1931.
44	Cassius C. Dowell	R	IA-07	March 4, 1915	8th term	
45	Leonidas C. Dyer	R	MO-12	March 4, 1915; Previous service, 1911–1914.	10th term*	
46	Richard P. Freeman	R	CT-02	March 4, 1915	8th term	
47	Lindley H. Hadley	R	WA-02	March 4, 1915	8th term	
48	George Huddleston	D	AL-09	March 4, 1915	8th term	
49	W. Frank James	R	MI-12	March 4, 1915	8th term	
50	Royal C. Johnson	R	SD-02	March 4, 1915	8th term	
51	Charles Cyrus Kearns	R	OH-06	March 4, 1915	8th term	Left the House in 1931.
52	David Hayes Kincheloe	D	KY-02	March 4, 1915	8th term	Resigned on October 5, 1930.
53	Frederick R. Lehlbach	R	NJ-10	March 4, 1915	8th term	
54	Nicholas Longworth	R	OH-01	March 4, 1915; Previous service, 1903–1913.	13th term*	Speaker of the House
55	Whitmell P. Martin	D	LA-03	March 4, 1915	8th term	Died on April 6, 1929.
56	James V. McClintic	D	OK-07	March 4, 1915	8th term	
57	Louis Thomas McFadden	R	PA-15	March 4, 1915	8th term	
58	William Bacon Oliver	D	AL-06	March 4, 1915	8th term	
59	Christian William Ramseyer	R	IA-06	March 4, 1915	8th term	
60	Henry B. Steagall	D	AL-03	March 4, 1915	8th term	
61	John Q. Tilson	R	CT-03	March 4, 1915; Previous service, 1909–1913.	10th term*	
62	Charles B. Timberlake	R	CO-02	March 4, 1915	8th term	
63	George H. Tinkham	R	MA-11	March 4, 1915	8th term	
64	Edward Hills Wason	R	NH-02	March 4, 1915	8th term	
65	Henry Winfield Watson	R	PA-09	March 4, 1915	8th term	
66	Thomas Sutler Williams	R	IL-24	March 4, 1915	8th term	Resigned on November 11, 1929.
67	Riley J. Wilson	D	LA-05	March 4, 1915	8th term	
68	William R. Wood	R	IN-10	March 4, 1915	8th term	
69	Bertrand Snell	R	NY-31	November 2, 1915	8th term	
70	Henry Wilson Temple	R	PA-25	November 2, 1915; Previous service, 1913–1915.	9th term*	
71	William B. Bankhead	D	AL-10	March 4, 1917	7th term	
72	Charles Hillyer Brand	D	GA-08	March 4, 1917	7th term	
73	Guy Edgar Campbell	R	PA-36	March 4, 1917	7th term	
74	Frederick H. Dominick	D	SC-03	March 4, 1917	7th term	
75	Herbert J. Drane	D	FL-01	March 4, 1917	7th term	
76	Hubert Fisher	D	TN-10	March 4, 1917	7th term	Left the House in 1931.
77	Burton L. French	R	ID-01	March 4, 1917; Previous service, 1903–1909 and 1911–1915.	12th term**	
78	John Marvin Jones	D	TX-18	March 4, 1917	7th term	
79	Melville Clyde Kelly	R	PA-33	March 4, 1917; Previous service, 1913–1915.	8th term*	
80	Harold Knutson	R	MN-06	March 4, 1917	7th term	
81	William Washington Larsen	D	GA-12	March 4, 1917	7th term	
82	Clarence F. Lea	D	CA-01	March 4, 1917	7th term	
83	Joseph J. Mansfield	D	TX-09	March 4, 1917	7th term	
84	John Franklin Miller	R	WA-01	March 4, 1917	7th term	Left the House in 1931.
85	Fred S. Purnell	R	IN-09	March 4, 1917	7th term	
86	Archie D. Sanders	R	NY-39	March 4, 1917	7th term	
87	William Francis Stevenson	D	SC-05	March 4, 1917	7th term	
88	Nathan Leroy Strong	R	PA-27	March 4, 1917	7th term	
89	Christopher D. Sullivan	D	NY-13	March 4, 1917	7th term	
90	Albert Henry Vestal	R	IN-08	March 4, 1917	7th term	
91	Wallace H. White Jr.	R	ME-02	March 4, 1917	7th term	Left the House in 1931.
92	Frederick Nicholas Zihlman	R	MD-06	March 4, 1917	7th term	Left the House in 1931.
93	Richard N. Elliott	R	IN-06	June 29, 1917	7th term	Left the House in 1931.
94	Schuyler Merritt	R	CT-04	November 6, 1917	7th term	Left the House in 1931.
95	William C. Wright	D	GA-04	January 16, 1918	7th term	
96	Anthony J. Griffin	D	NY-22	March 5, 1918	7th term	
97	S. Otis Bland	D	VA-01	July 2, 1918	7th term	
98	Florian Lampert	R	WI-06	November 5, 1918	7th term	Died on July 18, 1930.
99	Ernest Robinson Ackerman	R	NJ-05	March 4, 1919	6th term	
100	Henry E. Barbour	R	CA-07	March 4, 1919	6th term	
101	John C. Box	D	TX-02	March 4, 1919	6th term	Left the House in 1931.
102	Clay Stone Briggs	D	TX-07	March 4, 1919	6th term	
103	Clark Burdick	R	RI-01	March 4, 1919	6th term	
104	Carl Richard Chindblom	R	IL-10	March 4, 1919	6th term	
105	Charles A. Christopherson	R	SD-01	March 4, 1919	6th term	
106	Frank Crowther	R	NY-30	March 4, 1919	6th term	
107	Thomas H. Cullen	D	NY-04	March 4, 1919	6th term	
108	Ewin Lamar Davis	D	TN-05	March 4, 1919	6th term	
109	Lester J. Dickinson	R	IA-10	March 4, 1919	6th term	Left the House in 1931.
110	Guy U. Hardy	R	CO-03	March 4, 1919	6th term	
111	Andrew J. Hickey	R	IN-13	March 4, 1919	6th term	Left the House in 1931.
112	Homer Hoch	R	KS-04	March 4, 1919	6th term	
113	Claude Benton Hudspeth	D	TX-16	March 4, 1919	6th term	Left the House in 1931.
114	Samuel Austin Kendall	R	PA-24	March 4, 1919	6th term	
115	William Chester Lankford	D	GA-11	March 4, 1919	6th term	
116	Robert Luce	R	MA-13	March 4, 1919	6th term	
117	John McDuffie	D	AL-01	March 4, 1919	6th term	
118	James M. Mead	D	NY-42	March 4, 1919	6th term	
119	Earl C. Michener	R	MI-02	March 4, 1919	6th term	
120	C. Ellis Moore	R	OH-15	March 4, 1919	6th term	
121	B. Frank Murphy	R	OH-18	March 4, 1919	6th term	
122	Walter Newton	R	MN-05	March 4, 1919	6th term	Resigned on June 30, 1929.
123	Daniel A. Reed	R	NY-43	March 4, 1919	6th term	
124	John M. Robsion	R	KY-11	March 4, 1919	6th term	Resigned on January 10, 1930.
125	Milton William Shreve	R	PA-29	March 4, 1919; Previous service, 1913–1915.	7th term*	
126	James H. Sinclair	R	ND-03	March 4, 1919	6th term	
127	James G. Strong	R	KS-05	March 4, 1919	6th term	
128	John W. Summers	R	WA-04	March 4, 1919	6th term	
129	J. Will Taylor	R	TN-02	March 4, 1919	6th term	
130	Charles J. Thompson	R	OH-05	March 4, 1919	6th term	Left the House in 1931.
131	Richard Yates Jr.	R	IL	March 4, 1919	6th term	
132	Fritz G. Lanham	D	TX-12	April 19, 1919	6th term	
133	R. Walton Moore	D	VA-08	April 27, 1919	6th term	Left the House in 1931.
134	James O'Connor	D	LA-01	June 5, 1919	6th term	Left the House in 1931.
135	Patrick H. Drewry	D	VA-04	April 27, 1920	6th term	
136	Hamilton Fish Jr.	R	NY-26	November 2, 1920	6th term	
137	Harry C. Ransley	R	PA-03	November 2, 1920	6th term	
138	Carroll L. Beedy	R	ME-01	March 4, 1921	5th term	
139	Olger B. Burtness	R	ND-01	March 4, 1921	5th term	
140	Frank Clague	R	MN-02	March 4, 1921	5th term	
141	Ross A. Collins	D	MS-05	March 4, 1921	5th term	
142	Don B. Colton	R	UT-01	March 4, 1921	5th term	
143	James J. Connolly	R	PA-05	March 4, 1921	5th term	
144	Henry Allen Cooper	R	WI-01	March 4, 1921; Previous service, 1893–1919.	18th term*	Died on March 1, 1931.
145	William J. Driver	D	AR-01	March 4, 1921	5th term	
146	E. Hart Fenn	R	CT-01	March 4, 1921	5th term	Left the House in 1931.
147	Roy G. Fitzgerald	R	OH-03	March 4, 1921	5th term	Left the House in 1931.
148	Arthur M. Free	R	CA-08	March 4, 1921	5th term	
149	Hampton P. Fulmer	D	SC-07	March 4, 1921	5th term	
150	Daniel E. Garrett	D	TX-08	March 4, 1921; Previous service, 1913–1915 and 1917–1919.	7th term**	
151	Thomas Alan Goldsborough	D	MD-01	March 4, 1921	5th term	
152	William C. Hammer	D	NC-07	March 4, 1921	5th term	Died on September 26, 1930.
153	John C. Ketcham	R	MI-04	March 4, 1921	5th term	
154	William F. Kopp	R	IA-01	March 4, 1921	5th term	
155	Stanley H. Kunz	D	IL-08	March 4, 1921	5th term	Left the House in 1931.
156	Elmer O. Leatherwood	R	UT-02	March 4, 1921	5th term	Died on December 24, 1929.
157	John J. McSwain	D	SC-04	March 4, 1921	5th term	
158	M. Alfred Michaelson	R	IL-07	March 4, 1921	5th term	Left the House in 1931.
159	William M. Morgan	R	OH-17	March 4, 1921	5th term	Left the House in 1931.
160	John M. Nelson	R	WI-03	March 4, 1921; Previous service, 1906–1919.	12th term*	
161	Tilman B. Parks	D	AR-07	March 4, 1921	5th term	
162	Randolph Perkins	R	NJ-06	March 4, 1921	5th term	
163	John E. Rankin	D	MS-01	March 4, 1921	5th term	
164	B. Carroll Reece	R	TN-01	March 4, 1921	5th term	
165	Morgan G. Sanders	D	TX-03	March 4, 1921	5th term	
166	John N. Sandlin	D	LA-04	March 4, 1921	5th term	
167	John C. Speaks	R	OH-12	March 4, 1921	5th term	Left the House in 1931.
168	Elliott W. Sproul	R	IL-03	March 4, 1921	5th term	Left the House in 1931.
169	Phil Swing	R	CA-11	March 4, 1921	5th term	
170	Charles L. Underhill	R	MA-09	March 4, 1921	5th term	
171	William Williamson	R	SD-03	March 4, 1921	5th term	
172	Roy O. Woodruff	R	MI-10	March 4, 1921; Previous service, 1913–1915.	6th term*	
173	Adam Martin Wyant	R	PA-31	March 4, 1921	5th term	
174	Lamar Jeffers	D	AL-04	June 7, 1921	5th term	
175	Cyrenus Cole	R	IA-05	August 1, 1921	5th term	
176	A. Piatt Andrew	R	MA-06	September 27, 1921	5th term	
177	John E. Nelson	R	ME-03	March 20, 1922	5th term	
178	Henry St. George Tucker	D	VA-10	March 21, 1922; Previous service, 1889–1897.	10th term*	
179	Guinn Williams	D	TX-13	May 22, 1922	5th term	
180	Charles Laban Abernethy	D	NC-03	November 7, 1922	5th term	
181	Charles L. Gifford	R	MA-16	November 7, 1922	5th term	
182	Richard S. Aldrich	R	RI-02	March 4, 1923	4th term	
183	Miles C. Allgood	D	AL-07	March 4, 1923	4th term	
184	William W. Arnold	D	IL-23	March 4, 1923	4th term	
185	William Augustus Ayres	D	KS-08	March 4, 1923; Previous service, 1915–1921.	7th term*	
186	Robert L. Bacon	R	NY-01	March 4, 1923	4th term	
187	Edward M. Beers	R	PA-18	March 4, 1923	4th term	
188	Loring Milton Black Jr.	D	NY-05	March 4, 1923	4th term	
189	Sol Bloom	D	NY-19	March 4, 1923	4th term	
190	John J. Boylan	D	NY-15	March 4, 1923	4th term	
191	Charles Brand	R	OH-07	March 4, 1923	4th term	
192	Gordon Browning	D	TN-08	March 4, 1923	4th term	
193	T. Jeff Busby	D	MS-04	March 4, 1923	4th term	
194	Harry C. Canfield	D	IN-04	March 4, 1923	4th term	
195	Clarence Cannon	D	MO-09	March 4, 1923	4th term	
196	Emanuel Celler	D	NY-10	March 4, 1923	4th term	
197	William P. Connery Jr.	D	MA-07	March 4, 1923	4th term	
198	Parker Corning	D	NY-28	March 4, 1923	4th term	
199	Robert Crosser	D	OH-21	March 4, 1923; Previous service, 1913–1919.	7th term*	
200	Samuel Dickstein	D	NY-12	March 4, 1923	4th term	
201	John M. Evans	D	MT-01	March 4, 1923; Previous service, 1913–1921.	8th term*	
202	Milton C. Garber	R	OK-08	March 4, 1923	4th term	
203	Allard H. Gasque	D	SC-06	March 4, 1923	4th term	
204	Arthur H. Greenwood	D	IN-02	March 4, 1923	4th term	
205	William Wirt Hastings	D	OK-02	March 4, 1923; Previous service, 1915–1921.	7th term*	
206	William P. Holaday	R	IL-18	March 4, 1923	4th term	
207	Edgar Howard	D	NE-03	March 4, 1923	4th term	
208	Grant M. Hudson	R	MI-06	March 4, 1923	4th term	Left the House in 1931.
209	Cordell Hull	D	TN-04	March 4, 1923; Previous service, 1907–1921.	11th term*	Left the House in 1931.
210	William E. Hull	R	IL-16	March 4, 1923	4th term	
211	Luther Alexander Johnson	D	TX-06	March 4, 1923	4th term	
212	Jacob Banks Kurtz	R	PA-21	March 4, 1923	4th term	
213	Ole J. Kvale	R	MN-07	March 4, 1923	4th term	Died on September 11, 1929.
214	Fiorello H. La Guardia	R	NY-20	March 4, 1923; Previous service, 1917–1919.	6th term*	
215	Scott Leavitt	R	MT-02	March 4, 1923	4th term	
216	George W. Lindsay	D	NY-03	March 4, 1923	4th term	
217	Ralph F. Lozier	D	MO-02	March 4, 1923	4th term	
218	Joe J. Manlove	R	MO-15	March 4, 1923	4th term	
219	Tom D. McKeown	D	OK-04	March 4, 1923; Previous service, 1917–1921.	6th term*	
220	Clarence J. McLeod	R	MI-13	March 4, 1923; Previous service, 1920–1921.	5th term*	
221	Samuel Davis McReynolds	D	TN-03	March 4, 1923	4th term	
222	Jacob L. Milligan	D	MO-03	March 4, 1923; Previous service, 1920–1921.	5th term*	
223	Charles A. Mooney	D	OH-20	March 4, 1923; Previous service, 1919–1921.	5th term*	
224	John H. Morehead	D	NE-01	March 4, 1923	4th term	
225	David J. O'Connell	D	NY-09	March 4, 1923; Previous service, 1919–1921.	5th term*	Died on December 29, 1930.
226	Frank A. Oliver	D	NY-23	March 4, 1923	4th term	
227	Hubert H. Peavey	R	WI-11	March 4, 1923	4th term	
228	Heartsill Ragon	D	AR-05	March 4, 1923	4th term	
229	Henry Thomas Rainey	D	IL-20	March 4, 1923; Previous service, 1903–1921.	13th term*	
230	Frank R. Reid	R	IL-11	March 4, 1923	4th term	
231	Thomas J. B. Robinson	R	IA-03	March 4, 1923	4th term	
232	Milton A. Romjue	D	MO-01	March 4, 1923; Previous service, 1917–1921.	6th term*	
233	John C. Schafer	R	WI-04	March 4, 1923	4th term	
234	George J. Schneider	R	WI-09	March 4, 1923	4th term	
235	Willis G. Sears	R	NE-02	March 4, 1923	4th term	Left the House in 1931.
236	George N. Seger	R	NJ-07	March 4, 1923	4th term	
237	Robert G. Simmons	R	NE-06	March 4, 1923	4th term	
238	William H. Sproul	R	KS-03	March 4, 1923	4th term	Left the House in 1931.
239	Gale H. Stalker	R	NY-37	March 4, 1923	4th term	
240	John Taber	R	NY-36	March 4, 1923	4th term	
241	Maurice Thatcher	R	KY-05	March 4, 1923	4th term	
242	John Quayle	D	NY-07	March 4, 1923	4th term	Died on November 27, 1930.
243	Mell G. Underwood	D	OH-11	March 4, 1923	4th term	
244	Bird J. Vincent	R	MI-08	March 4, 1923	4th term	
245	J. Mayhew Wainwright	R	NY-25	March 4, 1923	4th term	Left the House in 1931.
246	Laurence Hawley Watres	R	PA-11	March 4, 1923	4th term	Left the House in 1931.
247	George Austin Welsh	R	PA-06	March 4, 1923	4th term	
248	Clifton A. Woodrum	D	VA-06	March 4, 1923	4th term	
249	Morton D. Hull	R	IL-02	April 3, 1923	4th term	
250	J. Lister Hill	D	AL-02	August 14, 1923	4th term	
251	Samuel B. Hill	D	WA-05	September 25, 1923	4th term	
252	Thomas A. Doyle	D	IL-04	November 6, 1923	4th term	Left the House in 1931.
253	Ernest Willard Gibson	R	VT-02	November 6, 1923	4th term	
254	John H. Kerr	D	NC-02	November 6, 1923	4th term	
255	John J. O'Connor	D	NY-16	November 6, 1923	4th term	
256	Anning Smith Prall	D	NY-11	November 6, 1923	4th term	
257	James Z. Spearing	D	LA-02	April 22, 1924	4th term	Left the House in 1931.
258	Stephen Warfield Gambrill	D	MD-05	November 4, 1924	4th term	
259	Thomas Hall	R	ND-02	November 4, 1924	4th term	
260	Charles Adkins	R	IL-19	March 4, 1925	3rd term	
261	John Clayton Allen	R	IL-14	March 4, 1925	3rd term	
262	August H. Andresen	R	MN-03	March 4, 1925	3rd term	
263	Samuel S. Arentz	R	NV	March 4, 1925; Previous service, 1921–1923.	4th term*	
264	Oscar L. Auf der Heide	D	NJ-11	March 4, 1925	3rd term	
265	Carl G. Bachmann	R	WV-01	March 4, 1925	3rd term	
266	Frank Llewellyn Bowman	R	WV-02	March 4, 1925	3rd term	
267	Elbert S. Brigham	R	VT-01	March 4, 1925	3rd term	Left the House in 1931.
268	Albert E. Carter	R	CA-06	March 4, 1925	3rd term	
269	William W. Chalmers	R	OH-09	March 4, 1925; Previous service, 1921–1923.	4th term*	Left the House in 1931.
270	Edward E. Cox	D	GA-02	March 4, 1925	3rd term	
271	Frederick M. Davenport	R	NY-33	March 4, 1925	3rd term	
272	John J. Douglass	D	MA-10	March 4, 1925	3rd term	
273	Charles Aubrey Eaton	R	NJ-04	March 4, 1925	3rd term	
274	Charles Gordon Edwards	D	GA-01	March 4, 1925; Previous service, 1907–1917.	8th term*	
275	Edward Everett Eslick	D	TN-07	March 4, 1925	3rd term	
276	Franklin William Fort	R	NJ-09	March 4, 1925	3rd term	Left the House in 1931.
277	Frank H. Foss	R	MA-03	March 4, 1925	3rd term	
278	James P. Glynn	R	CT-05	March 4, 1925; Previous service, 1915–1923.	7th term*	Died on March 6, 1930.
279	Benjamin M. Golder	R	PA-04	March 4, 1925	3rd term	
280	Godfrey G. Goodwin	R	MN-10	March 4, 1925	3rd term	
281	Robert A. Green	D	FL-02	March 4, 1925	3rd term	
282	Fletcher Hale	R	NH-01	March 4, 1925	3rd term	
283	Albert R. Hall	R	IN-11	March 4, 1925	3rd term	Left the House in 1931.
284	Butler B. Hare	D	SC-02	March 4, 1925	3rd term	
285	David Hogg	R	IN-12	March 4, 1925	3rd term	
286	Robert G. Houston	R	DE	March 4, 1925	3rd term	
287	Edward M. Irwin	R	IL-22	March 4, 1925	3rd term	Left the House in 1931.
288	Thomas A. Jenkins	R	OH-10	March 4, 1925	3rd term	
289	Noble J. Johnson	R	IN-05	March 4, 1925	3rd term	Left the House in 1931.
290	William Richard Johnson	R	IL-13	March 4, 1925	3rd term	
291	Florence Prag Kahn	R	CA-04	March 4, 1925	3rd term	
292	Bolivar E. Kemp	D	LA-06	March 4, 1925	3rd term	
293	F. Dickinson Letts	R	IA-02	March 4, 1925	3rd term	Left the House in 1931.
294	Frederick William Magrady	R	PA-17	March 4, 1925	3rd term	
295	Joseph William Martin Jr.	R	MA-15	March 4, 1925	3rd term	
296	Thomas S. McMillan	D	SC-01	March 4, 1925	3rd term	
297	Franklin Menges	R	PA-22	March 4, 1925	3rd term	Left the House in 1931.
298	William L. Nelson	D	MO-08	March 4, 1925; Previous service, 1919–1921.	4th term*	
299	Mary Teresa Norton	D	NJ-12	March 4, 1925	3rd term	
300	Harcourt J. Pratt	R	NY-27	March 4, 1925	3rd term	
301	Harry E. Rowbottom	R	IN-01	March 4, 1925	3rd term	Left the House in 1931.
302	Samuel Rutherford	D	GA-06	March 4, 1925	3rd term	
303	Andrew Lawrence Somers	D	NY-06	March 4, 1925	3rd term	
304	George R. Stobbs	R	MA-04	March 4, 1925	3rd term	Left the House in 1931.
305	Lloyd Thurston	R	IA-08	March 4, 1925	3rd term	
306	Lindsay Carter Warren	D	NC-01	March 4, 1925	3rd term	
307	Joseph Whitehead	D	VA-05	March 4, 1925	3rd term	Left the House in 1931.
308	William Madison Whittington	D	MS-03	March 4, 1925	3rd term	
309	Edith Nourse Rogers	R	MA-05	June 30, 1925	3rd term	
310	Joseph L. Hooper	R	MI-03	August 18, 1925	3rd term	
311	Harry Lane Englebright	R	CA-02	August 31, 1926	3rd term	
312	Richard J. Welch	R	CA-05	August 31, 1926	3rd term	
313	John J. Cochran	D	MO-11	November 2, 1926	3rd term	
314	Frederick W. Dallinger	R	MA-08	November 2, 1926; Previous service, 1915–1925.	8th term*	
315	Frank P. Bohn	R	MI-11	March 4, 1927	2nd term	
316	John T. Buckbee	R	IL-12	March 4, 1927	2nd term	
317	Patrick J. Carley	D	NY-08	March 4, 1927	2nd term	
318	Wilburn Cartwright	D	OK-03	March 4, 1927	2nd term	
319	John J. Casey	D	PA-12	March 4, 1927; Previous service, 1913–1917, 1919–1921 and 1923–1925.	6th term***	Died on May 5, 1929.
320	James Mitchell Chase	R	PA-23	March 4, 1927	2nd term	
321	Robert H. Clancy	R	MI-01	March 4, 1927; Previous service, 1923–1925.	3rd term*	
322	John D. Clarke	R	NY-34	March 4, 1927; Previous service, 1921–1925.	4th term*	
323	Thomas Cunningham Cochran	R	PA-28	March 4, 1927	2nd term	
324	Joe Crail	R	CA-10	March 4, 1927	2nd term	
325	Lewis Williams Douglas	D	AZ	March 4, 1927	2nd term	
326	Isaac Hoffer Doutrich	R	PA-19	March 4, 1927	2nd term	
327	Harry Allison Estep	R	PA-35	March 4, 1927	2nd term	
328	William E. Evans	R	CA-09	March 4, 1927	2nd term	
329	James M. Fitzpatrick	D	NY-24	March 4, 1927	2nd term	
330	William Voris Gregory	D	KY-01	March 4, 1927	2nd term	
331	Ulysses Samuel Guyer	R	KS-02	March 4, 1927; Previous service, 1924–1925.	3rd term*	
332	Homer W. Hall	R	IL-17	March 4, 1927	2nd term	
333	Harold G. Hoffman	R	NJ-03	March 4, 1927	2nd term	Left the House in 1931.
334	Clifford R. Hope	R	KS-07	March 4, 1927	2nd term	
335	James A. Hughes	R	WV-04	March 4, 1927; Previous service, 1901–1915.	9th term*	Died on March 2, 1930.
336	James T. Igoe	D	IL-06	March 4, 1927	2nd term	
337	Jed Johnson	D	OK-06	March 4, 1927	2nd term	
338	Charles A. Kading	R	WI-02	March 4, 1927	2nd term	
339	Katherine G. Langley	R	KY-10	March 4, 1927	2nd term	Left the House in 1931.
340	James Russell Leech	R	PA-20	March 4, 1927	2nd term	
341	Melvin Maas	R	MN-04	March 4, 1927	2nd term	
342	Henry F. Niedringhaus	R	MO-10	March 4, 1927	2nd term	
343	Vincent Luke Palmisano	D	MD-03	March 4, 1927	2nd term	
344	Conrad Selvig	R	MN-09	March 4, 1927	2nd term	
345	William I. Sirovich	D	NY-14	March 4, 1927	2nd term	
346	Leslie Jasper Steele	D	GA-05	March 4, 1927	2nd term	Died on July 24, 1929.
347	J. Howard Swick	R	PA-26	March 4, 1927	2nd term	
348	Malcolm C. Tarver	D	GA-07	March 4, 1927	2nd term	
349	Charles A. Wolverton	R	NJ-01	March 4, 1927	2nd term	
350	Tom A. Yon	D	FL-03	March 4, 1927	2nd term	
351	René L. De Rouen	D	LA-07	August 23, 1927	2nd term	
352	Franklin F. Korell	R	OR-03	October 18, 1927	2nd term	Left the House in 1931.
353	James M. Beck	R	PA-01	November 8, 1927	2nd term	
354	Clarence E. Hancock	R	NY-35	November 8, 1927	2nd term	
355	Robert R. Butler	R	OR-02	November 6, 1928	2nd term	
356	Francis D. Culkin	R	NY-32	November 6, 1928	2nd term	
357	John William McCormack	D	MA-12	November 6, 1928	2nd term	
358	LaFayette L. Patterson	D	AL-05	November 6, 1928	2nd term	
359	Richard B. Wigglesworth	R	MA-14	November 6, 1928	2nd term	
360	James Wolfenden	R	PA-08	November 6, 1928	2nd term	
361	Pearl Peden Oldfield	D	AR-02	January 9, 1929	2nd term	Left the House in 1931.
362	David W. Hopkins	R	MO-04	February 5, 1929	2nd term	
363	Joseph E. Baird	R	OH-13	March 4, 1929	1st term	Left the House in 1931.
364	Robert E. Lee Blackburn	R	KY-07	March 4, 1929	1st term	Left the House in 1931.
365	Chester C. Bolton	R	OH-22	March 4, 1929	1st term	
366	George F. Brumm	R	PA-13	March 4, 1929; Previous service, 1923–1927.	3rd term*	
367	William F. Brunner	D	NY-02	March 4, 1929	1st term	
368	John L. Cable	R	OH-04	March 4, 1929; Previous service, 1921–1925.	3rd term*	
369	Ed H. Campbell	R	IA-11	March 4, 1929	1st term	
370	Vincent Carter	R	WY	March 4, 1929	1st term	
371	Victor Christgau	R	MN-01	March 4, 1929	1st term	
372	J. Bayard Clark	D	NC-06	March 4, 1929	1st term	
373	Linwood Clark	R	MD-02	March 4, 1929	1st term	Left the House in 1931.
374	Edmund F. Cooke	R	NY-41	March 4, 1929	1st term	
375	Jere Cooper	D	TN-09	March 4, 1929	1st term	
376	William R. Coyle	R	PA-30	March 4, 1929; Previous service, 1925–1927.	2nd term*	
377	John D. Craddock	R	KY-04	March 4, 1929	1st term	Left the House in 1931.
378	Oliver H. Cross	D	TX-11	March 4, 1929	1st term	
379	Wall Doxey	D	MS-02	March 4, 1929	1st term	
380	James W. Dunbar	R	IN-03	March 4, 1929; Previous service, 1919–1923.	3rd term*	Left the House in 1931.
381	Oscar Stanton De Priest	R	IL-01	March 4, 1929	1st term	
382	William R. Eaton	R	CO-01	March 4, 1929	1st term	
383	Edgar C. Ellis	R	MO-05	March 4, 1929; Previous service, 1905–1909, 1921–1923 and 1925–1927.	5th term***	Left the House in 1931.
384	Charles Joseph Esterly	R	PA-14	March 4, 1929; Previous service, 1925–1927.	2nd term*	Left the House in 1931.
385	Claude A. Fuller	D	AR-03	March 4, 1929	1st term	
386	Jacob A. Garber	R	VA-07	March 4, 1929	1st term	Left the House in 1931.
387	David Delano Glover	D	AR-06	March 4, 1929	1st term	
388	Robert S. Hall	D	MS-06	March 4, 1929	1st term	
389	Thomas Jefferson Halsey	R	MO-06	March 4, 1929	1st term	Left the House in 1931.
390	Fred A. Hartley	R	NJ-08	March 4, 1929	1st term	
391	William E. Hess	R	OH-02	March 4, 1929	1st term	
392	Merlin Hull	R	WI-07	March 4, 1929	1st term	Left the House in 1931.
393	Fred Gustus Johnson	R	NE-05	March 4, 1929	1st term	Left the House in 1931.
394	Rowland Louis Johnston	R	MO-16	March 4, 1929	1st term	Left the House in 1931.
395	Charles A. Jonas	R	NC-08	March 4, 1929	1st term	Left the House in 1931.
396	Will Kirk Kaynor	R	MA-02	March 4, 1929	1st term	Died on December 20, 1929.
397	Elva R. Kendall	R	KY-09	March 4, 1929	1st term	Left the House in 1931.
398	Charles Edward Kiefner	R	MO-13	March 4, 1929; Previous service, 1925–1927.	2nd term*	Left the House in 1931.
399	William P. Lambertson	R	KS-01	March 4, 1929	1st term	
400	Menalcus Lankford	R	VA-02	March 4, 1929	1st term	
401	Robert Quincy Lee	D	TX-17	March 4, 1929	1st term	Died on April 18, 1930.
402	Louis Ludlow	D	IN-07	March 4, 1929	1st term	
403	Charles B. McClintock	R	OH-16	March 4, 1929	1st term	
404	Augustus McCloskey	D	TX-14	March 4, 1929	1st term	Resigned on February 10, 1930.
405	Ruth Hanna McCormick	R	IL	March 4, 1929	1st term	Left the House in 1931.
406	Grant E. Mouser Jr.	R	OH-08	March 4, 1929	1st term	
407	J. Lincoln Newhall	R	KY-06	March 4, 1929	1st term	Left the House in 1931.
408	Charles O'Connor	R	OK-01	March 4, 1929	1st term	Left the House in 1931.
409	John William Palmer	R	MO-07	March 4, 1929	1st term	Left the House in 1931.
410	Wright Patman	D	TX-01	March 4, 1929	1st term	
411	William Alvin Pittenger	R	MN-08	March 4, 1929	1st term	
412	Ruth Baker Pratt	R	NY-17	March 4, 1929	1st term	
413	George M. Pritchard	R	NC-10	March 4, 1929	1st term	Left the House in 1931.
414	Jeremiah E. O'Connell	D	RI-03	March 4, 1929; Previous service, 1923–1927.	3rd term*	Resigned on May 9, 1930.
415	Ruth Bryan Owen	D	FL-04	March 4, 1929	1st term	
416	Frank M. Ramey	R	IL-21	March 4, 1929	1st term	Left the House in 1931.
417	Charles W. Roark	R	KY-03	March 4, 1929	1st term	Died on April 5, 1929.
418	Francis Seiberling	R	OH-14	March 4, 1929	1st term	
419	Joseph Crockett Shaffer	R	VA-09	March 4, 1929	1st term	Left the House in 1931.
420	Dewey Jackson Short	R	MO-14	March 4, 1929	1st term	Left the House in 1931.
421	Hugh Ike Shott	R	WV-05	March 4, 1929	1st term	
422	Albert G. Simms	R	NM	March 4, 1929	1st term	Left the House in 1931.
423	Charles Henry Sloan	R	NE-04	March 4, 1929; Previous service, 1911–1919.	5th term*	Left the House in 1931.
424	Joe L. Smith	D	WV-06	March 4, 1929	1st term	
425	Donald F. Snow	R	ME-04	March 4, 1929	1st term	
426	Charles I. Sparks	R	KS-06	March 4, 1929	1st term	
427	William H. Stafford	R	WI-05	March 4, 1929; Previous service, 1903–1911, 1913–1919 and 1921–1923.	9th term***	
428	Ulysses S. Stone	R	OK-05	March 4, 1929	2nd term	Left the House in 1931.
429	Patrick J. Sullivan	R	PA-34	March 4, 1929	2nd term	
430	Charles Edward Swanson	R	IA-09	March 4, 1929	2nd term	
431	Lewis L. Walker	R	KY-08	March 4, 1929	2nd term	Left the House in 1931.
432	James L. Whitley	R	NY-38	March 4, 1929	2nd term	
433	John M. Wolverton	R	WV-03	March 4, 1929; Previous service, 1925–1927.	2nd term*	Left the House in 1931.
	John William Moore	D	KY-03	June 1, 1929; Previous service, 1925–1929.	3rd term*	
	Charles Murray Turpin	R	PA-12	June 4, 1929	1st term	
	William I. Nolan	R	MN-05	July 17, 1929	1st term	
	Numa F. Montet	D	LA-03	August 6, 1929	1st term	
	Robert Ramspeck	D	GA-05	October 2, 1929	1st term	
	Paul John Kvale	R	MN-07	October 16, 1929	1st term	
	Joseph A. Gavagan	D	NY-21	November 5, 1929	1st term	
	J. Roland Kinzer	R	PA-10	January 28, 1930	1st term	
	Harry M. Wurzbach	R	TX-14	February 10, 1930; Previous service, 1921–1929.	5th term*	
	William J. Granfield	D	MA-02	February 11, 1930	1st term	
	Charles Finley	R	KY-11	February 15, 1930	1st term	
	Martin J. Kennedy	D	NY-18	April 11, 1930	1st term	
	Thomas L. Blanton	D	TX-17	May 20, 1930; Previous service, 1917–1929.	6th term*	
	Burnett M. Chiperfield	R	IL-15	November 4, 1930; Previous service, 1915–1917.	2nd term*	
	Francis B. Condon	D	RI-03	November 4, 1930	1st term	
	John Lloyd Dorsey Jr.	D	KY-02	November 4, 1930	1st term	Left the House in 1931.
	Edmund F. Erk	R	PA-32	November 4, 1930	1st term	
	Edward W. Goss	R	CT-05	November 4, 1930	1st term	
	Franklin Wills Hancock Jr.	D	NC-05	November 4, 1930	1st term	
	Robert Lynn Hogg	R	WV-04	November 4, 1930	1st term	
	Hinton James	D	NC-07	November 4, 1930	1st term	Left the House in 1931.
	Frederick C. Loofbourow	R	UT-02	November 4, 1930	1st term	
	Claude V. Parsons	D	IL-24	November 4, 1930	1st term	
	Michael Reilly	D	WI-06	November 4, 1930; Previous service, 1913–1917.	3rd term*	
	Robert F. Rich	R	PA-16	November 4, 1930	1st term	
	Effiegene Locke Wingo	D	AR-04	November 4, 1930	1st term	
	Stephen A. Rudd	D	NY-09	February 17, 1931	1st term	

== Delegates ==
Rank	Delegate	Party	District	Seniority date (Previous service, if any)	No.# of term(s)	Notes
1	Félix Córdova Dávila		PR	August 7, 1917	7th term	
2	Daniel Sutherland	R	AK	March 4, 1921	5th term	
3	Pedro Guevara	Nac	PHL	March 4, 1923	4th term	
4	Victor S. K. Houston	R	HI	March 4, 1927	2nd term	
5	Camilo Osías	Nac	PHL	March 4, 1929	1st term	

== See also ==
- 71st United States Congress
- List of United States congressional districts
- List of United States senators in the 71st Congress
