= Lists of new members of the United States Congress =

This is a list of lists of new members of the United States Congress. Lists include members of the House and Senate who were elected before the start of Congress, as well as members who were elected during Congress.

== Lists of new members by Congress ==
=== 20th century ===
- List of new members of the 90th United States Congress
- List of new members of the 91st United States Congress
- List of new members of the 92nd United States Congress
- List of new members of the 93rd United States Congress
- List of new members of the 94th United States Congress
- List of new members of the 95th United States Congress
- List of new members of the 96th United States Congress
- List of new members of the 97th United States Congress
- List of new members of the 98th United States Congress
- List of new members of the 99th United States Congress
- List of new members of the 100th United States Congress
- List of new members of the 101st United States Congress
- List of new members of the 102nd United States Congress
- List of new members of the 103rd United States Congress
- List of new members of the 104th United States Congress
- List of new members of the 105th United States Congress
- List of new members of the 106th United States Congress

=== 21st century ===
- List of new members of the 107th United States Congress
- List of new members of the 108th United States Congress
- List of new members of the 109th United States Congress
- List of new members of the 110th United States Congress
- List of new members of the 111th United States Congress
- List of new members of the 112th United States Congress
- List of new members of the 113th United States Congress
- List of new members of the 114th United States Congress
- List of new members of the 115th United States Congress
- List of new members of the 116th United States Congress
- List of new members of the 117th United States Congress
- List of new members of the 118th United States Congress
- List of new members of the 119th United States Congress
- List of new members of the 120th United States Congress

== See also ==
- Lists of the United States Congress
