= List of United States senators in the 1st Congress =

This is a complete list of United States senators during the 1st United States Congress listed by seniority from March 4, 1789, to March 3, 1791.

The order of service is based on the commencement of the senator's first term, with senators entering service the same day ranked alphabetically. The Senate now assigns an official number to each senator, which is the second number given in the table.

In this congress, James Gunn was the most senior junior senator and Theodore Foster was the most junior senior senator.

During this time, there were no official parties, but senators are labeled as Pro-Administration (F, Federalist), and Anti-Administration (A).

== Terms of service ==
Class	Terms of service of senators that expired in years
Class 2	Terms of service of senators that expired in 1791 (DE, GA, MA, NC, NH, RI, SC, and VA.)
Class 3	Terms of service of senators that expired in 1793 (CT, DE, MD, NC, NH, NJ, NY, PA, and SC.)
Class 1	Terms of service of senators that expired in 1795 (CT, GA, MA, MD, NJ, NY, PA, RI, and VA.)

== U.S. Senate seniority list ==
Rank	Historical rank	Senator (party-state)	Seniority date
1	1	Richard Bassett (A-DE)	March 4, 1789
2	2	Pierce Butler (F-SC)	March 4, 1789
3	3	Charles Carroll (F-MD)	March 4, 1789
4	4	Tristram Dalton (F-MA)	March 4, 1789
5	5	Oliver Ellsworth (F-CT)	March 4, 1789
6	6	Jonathan Elmer (F-NJ)	March 4, 1789
7	7	William Few (A-GA)	March 4, 1789
8	8	William Grayson (A-VA)	March 4, 1789
9	9	James Gunn (A-GA)	March 4, 1789
10	10	John Henry (F-MD)	March 4, 1789
11	11	Ralph Izard (F-SC)	March 4, 1789
12	12	William Samuel Johnson (F-CT)	March 4, 1789
13	13	John Langdon (F-NH)	March 4, 1789
14	14	Richard Henry Lee (A-VA)	March 4, 1789
15	15	William Maclay (A-PA)	March 4, 1789
16	16	Robert Morris (F-PA)	March 4, 1789
17	17	William Paterson (F-NJ)	March 4, 1789
18	18	George Read (F-DE)	March 4, 1789
19	19	Caleb Strong (F-MA)	March 4, 1789
20	20	Paine Wingate (A-NH)	March 4, 1789
21	21	Rufus King (F-NY)	July 25, 1789
22	22	Philip John Schuyler (F-NY)	July 25, 1789
23	23	Benjamin Hawkins (F-NC)	November 27, 1789
24	24	Samuel Johnston (F-NC)	November 27, 1789
25	25	John Walker (F-VA)	March 31, 1790
26	26	Theodore Foster (F-RI)	June 7, 1790
27	27	Joseph Stanton IV (A-RI)	June 7, 1790
28	28	James Monroe (A-VA)	November 9, 1790
29	29	Philemon Dickinson (F-NJ)	November 23, 1790

== See also ==
- 1st United States Congress
- List of United States representatives in the 1st Congress
