= List of United States representatives in the 14th Congress =

This is a complete list of United States representatives during the 14th United States Congress listed by seniority. For the most part, representatives are ranked by the beginning of their terms in office.

As an historical article, the districts and party affiliations listed reflect those during the 14th Congress (March 4, 1815 – March 3, 1817). Seats and party affiliations on similar lists for other congresses will be different for certain members.

This article describes the criteria for seniority in the House of Representatives and sets out the list of members by seniority. It is prepared on the basis of the interpretation of seniority applied to the House of Representatives in the current congress. In the absence of information to the contrary, it is presumed that the twenty-first-century practice is identical to the seniority customs used during the 14th Congress.

== House seniority ==
Seniority in the House, for representatives with unbroken service, depends on the date on which the members first term began. That date is either the start of the Congress (4 March in odd numbered years, for the era up to and including the 73rd Congress starting in 1933) or the date of a special election during the Congress. Since many members start serving on the same day as others, ranking between them is based on alphabetical order by the last name of the representative.

Representatives in early congresses were often elected after the legal start of the Congress. Such representatives are attributed with unbroken seniority, from the legal start of the congressional term, if they were the first person elected to a seat in a Congress. The date of the election is indicated in a note.

The seniority date is normally taken from the members entry in the Biographical Directory of the United States Congress, except where the date given is the legal start of the Congress and the actual election (for someone who was not the first person elected to the seat in that Congress) was later. The date of election is taken from United States Congressional Elections 1788–1997. In a few instances the latter work provides dates, for the start and end of terms, which correct those in the Biographical Directory.

The Biographical Directory normally uses the date of a special election, as the seniority date. However, mostly in early congresses, the date of the member taking his seat can be the one given. The date of the special election is mentioned in a note to the list below, when that date is not used as the seniority date by the Biographical Directory.

Representatives who returned to the House, after having previously served, are credited with service equal to one less than the total number of terms they served. When a representative has served a prior term of less than two terms (i.e. prior term minus one equals less than one), he is ranked above all others whose service begins on the same day.

== Leadership ==
In this Congress the only formal leader was the speaker of the House. A speakership ballot was held on December 4, 1815, and Henry Clay (DR-KY) was re-elected for a third consecutive Congress (although he had resigned on January 19, 1814, so his service had not been continuous).

The title Dean of the House (sometimes known, in the nineteenth century, as Father of the House) was held by the member with the longest continuous service. It was not a leadership position.

== Standing committees ==
The House created its first standing committee, on April 13, 1789. There were twelve standing committees, listed in the rules initially used by the 14th Congress. Seven additional committees were added during the Congress.

Committees, in this period, were normally appointed for a session at a time by the speaker. However the resolution of March 30, 1816, which created the committees on departmental expenditures and Expenditures on Public Buildings, provided for those standing committees to be appointed for the whole Congress.

This list refers to the standing committees of the House in the 14th Congress, the year of establishment as a standing committee, the number of members assigned to the committee and the dates of appointment in each session (or if appropriate for the Congress), the end of the session (if appropriate) and its chairman. Chairmen, who were re-appointed after serving in the previous Congress, are indicated by an *.

The first session was December 4, 1815 – April 30, 1816 (148 days) and the second session was December 2, 1816 – March 3, 1817 (92 days).

No.	Committee	From	Members	Appointed	Chairman
1	Accounts	1805	3	December 6, 1815 – April 30, 1816	John McLean (DR-OH)
1	Accounts	1805	3	December 3, 1816 – March 3, 1817	Peter Little (DR-MD)
2	Claims	1794	7	December 6, 1815 – April 30, 1816	*Bartlett Yancey (DR-NC)
2	Claims	1794	7	December 3, 1816 – March 3, 1817	*Bartlett Yancey (DR-NC)
3	Commerce and Manufactures	1795	7	December 6, 1815 – April 30, 1816	*Thomas Newton, Jr. (DR-VA)
3	Commerce and Manufactures	1795	7	December 3, 1816 – March 3, 1817	*Thomas Newton, Jr. (DR-VA)
4	District of Columbia	1808	7	December 6, 1815 – April 30, 1816	Henry S. Tucker (DR-VA)
4	District of Columbia	1808	7	December 3, 1816 – March 3, 1817	Henry S. Tucker (DR-VA)
5	Elections	1789	7	December 6, 1815 – April 30, 1816	John W. Taylor (DR-NY)
5	Elections	1789	7	December 3, 1816 – March 3, 1817	John W. Taylor (DR-NY)
6	Expenditures in the Navy Department	1816	3	March 30, 1816 – March 3, 1817	Stevenson Archer (DR-MD)
7	Expenditures in the Post Office Department	1816	3	March 30, 1816 – March 3, 1817	Newton Cannon (DR-TN)
8	Expenditures in the State Department	1816	3	March 30, 1816 – March 3, 1817	John B. Yates (DR-NY)
9	Expenditures in the Treasury Department	1816	3	March 30, 1816 – March 3, 1817	Samuel Smith (DR-MD)
10	Expenditures in the War Department	1816	3	March 30, 1816 – March 3, 1817	Erastus Root (DR-NY)
11	Expenditures on Public Buildings	1816	3	March 30, 1816 – March 3, 1817	Lewis Condict (DR-NJ)
12	Judiciary	1813	7	December 6, 1815 – April 30, 1816	Hugh Nelson (DR-VA)
12	Judiciary	1813	7	December 3, 1816 – March 3, 1817	Hugh Nelson (DR-VA)
13	Pensions and Revolutionary Claims	1813	7	December 6, 1815 – April 30, 1816	*John J. Chappell (DR-SC)
13	Pensions and Revolutionary Claims	1813	7	December 3, 1816 – March 3, 1817	*John J. Chappell (DR-SC)
14	Post Office and Post Roads	1808	7	December 6, 1815 – April 30, 1816	Samuel D. Ingham (DR-PA)
14	Post Office and Post Roads	1808	7	December 3, 1816 – March 3, 1817	Samuel D. Ingham (DR-PA)
15	Private Land Claims	1816	5	December 3, 1816 – March 3, 1817	Solomon P. Sharp (DR-KY)
16	Public Expenditures	1814	7	December 6, 1815 – April 30, 1816	William H. Murfree (DR-NC)
16	Public Expenditures	1814	7	December 3, 1816 – March 3, 1817	Israel Pickens (DR-NC)
17	Public Lands	1805	7	December 6, 1815 – April 30, 1816	Thomas B. Robertson (DR-LA)
17	Public Lands	1805	7	December 3, 1816 – March 3, 1817	Thomas B. Robertson (DR-LA)
18	Revisal and Unfinished Business	1795	3	December 6, 1815 – April 30, 1816	Lewis Condict (DR-NJ)
18	Revisal and Unfinished Business	1795	3	December 3, 1816 – March 3, 1817	Lewis Condict (DR-NJ)
19	Ways and Means	1802	7	December 6, 1815 – April 30, 1816	William Lowndes (DR-SC)
19	Ways and Means	1802	7	December 3, 1816 – March 3, 1817	William Lowndes (DR-SC)

== List of representatives by seniority ==
A numerical rank is assigned to each of the 182 members initially elected to the 14th Congress. Other members, who were not the first person elected to a seat but who joined the House during the Congress, are not assigned a number (except for the representative from the newly admitted state of Indiana, who is assigned the number 183).

Ten representatives-elect were not sworn in. Five of them died, three resigned and two did not qualify and were unseated after an election challenge. In addition Henry Clay (DR-KY) had his seat declared vacant, as he undertook a diplomatic task inconsistent with being a congressman. However, Henry Clay was re-elected to fill the vacancy and so was able to be sworn in. The list below includes the representatives-elect (with name in italics), with the seniority they would have held if sworn in.

Party designations used in this article are DR for Democratic-Republican members and F for Federalist representatives. Designations used for service in the first three congresses are (A) for Anti-Administration members and (P) for Pro-Administration representatives.

U.S. House seniority
Rank	Representative	Party	District	Seniority date	Notes
Thirteen consecutive terms
1	Nathaniel Macon	DR	NC-6	March 4, 1791	(A) 1791–95. Elected to this Congress: August 10, 1815. Dean of the House (1815). Resigned, to become US Senator: December 13, 1815.
Eleven non-consecutive terms
2	William Findley	DR	PA-11	March 4, 1803	Previously served (A) 1791–95 and (DR) 1795–99 while as a member of the House. Last term while serving as a member of the House.
Ten consecutive terms
3	Richard Stanford	DR	NC-8	March 4, 1797	Elected to this Congress: August 10, 1815. Dean of the House (1815–16). Died on April 9, 1816, while still serving as a member of the House.
Ten non-consecutive terms
4	John Clopton	DR	VA-23	March 4, 1801	Previously served (DR) 1795–99 while serving as a member of the House. Elected to this Congress: April 1815. Died on September 11, 1816, while still serving as a member of the House.
Nine consecutive terms
5	John Davenport	F	CT-al	March 4, 1799	Dean of the House (1816–17). Last term while still serving as a member of the House.
Nine non-consecutive terms
6	David Bard	DR	PA-9	March 4, 1803	Previously served (DR) 1795–99 while as a member of the House. Died, as Representative-elect: March 12, 1815.
7	Matthew Clay	DR	VA-15	March 4, 1815	Previously served (DR) 1797–1813 while as a member of the House. Elected to this Congress: April 1815. Died, as Representative-elect: May 27, 1815.
Eight consecutive terms
8	Thomas Newton, Jr.	DR	VA-21	March 4, 1801	Elected to this Congress: April 1815. Chairman: Commerce and Manufactures.
9	Benjamin Tallmadge	F	CT-al	September 21, 1801	Last term
Eight non-consecutive terms
10	John Randolph	DR	VA-16	March 4, 1815	Previously served (DR) 1799–1813 while as a member of the House. Elected to this Congress: April 1815. Last term while serving as a member of the House.
Seven consecutive terms
11	Peterson Goodwyn	DR	VA-19	March 4, 1803	Elected to this Congress: April 1815
12	Joseph Lewis, Jr.	F	VA-8	March 4, 1803	Elected to this Congress: April 1815. Last term while serving as a member of the House.
13	Samuel Taggart	F	MA-6	March 4, 1803	Last term while serving as a member of the House.
Six consecutive terms
14	Charles Goldsborough	F	MD-8	March 4, 1805	Last term while serving as a member of the House.
15	Jonathan O. Moseley	F	CT-al	March 4, 1805	
16	Timothy Pitkin	F	CT-al	September 16, 1805	
17	Lewis B. Sturges	F	CT-al	September 16, 1805	Last term while serving as a member of the House.
18	William A. Burwell	DR	VA-14	December 1, 1806	Elected to this Congress: April 1815
Six non-consecutive terms
19	Nicholas R. Moore	DR	MD-5	March 4, 1813	Previously served (DR) 1803–11 while as a member of the House. Resigned, as Representative-elect: 1815 or 1816.
20	Thomas Moore	DR	SC-8	March 4, 1815	Previously served (DR) 1801–13 while as a member of the House. Last term while serving as a member of the House.
21	Henry Southard	DR	NJ-al	March 4, 1815	Previously served (DR) 1801–11 while as a member of the House.
22	John G. Jackson	DR	VA-1	March 4, 1813	Previously served (DR) 1803 – September 28, 1810. Elected to this Congress: April 1815. Last term while serving as a member of the House.
Five consecutive terms
23	Epaphroditus Champion	F	CT-al	March 4, 1807	Last term while serving as a member of the House.
24	Joseph Desha	DR	KY-4	March 4, 1807	
25	Richard M. Johnson	DR	KY-3	March 4, 1807	
26	Thomas Gholson, Jr.	DR	VA-18	November 7, 1808	Elected to this Congress: April 1815. Died July 4, 1816, while still serving as a member of the House.
Five non-consecutive terms
27	Burwell Bassett	DR	VA-13	March 4, 1815	Previously served (DR) 1805–13 while as a member of the House. Elected to this Congress: April 1815.
28	Joseph Hiester	DR	PA-7	March 4, 1815	Previously served (DR) December 1, 1798 – 1805 while as a member of the House
Four consecutive terms
29	James Breckinridge	F	VA-5	March 4, 1809	Elected to this Congress: April 1815. Last term while serving as a member of the House.
30	William Crawford	DR	PA-5	March 4, 1809	Last term while serving as a member of the House.
31	Aaron Lyle	DR	PA-12	March 4, 1809	Last term while serving as a member of the House.
32	Samuel McKee	DR	KY-7	March 4, 1809	Last term while serving as a member of the House.
33	Daniel Sheffey	F	VA-6	March 4, 1809	Elected to this Congress: April 1815. Last term while serving as a member of the House.
34	Laban Wheaton	F	MA-10	March 4, 1809	Last term while serving as a member of the House.
35	Robert Wright	DR	MD-7	November 29, 1810	Last term while serving as a member of the House until 17th Congress
Four non-consecutive terms
36	Benjamin Huger	F	SC-3	March 4, 1815	Previously served (F) 1799–1805 while as a member of the House. Last term while serving as a member of the House.
37	John Sevier	DR	TN-2	March 4, 1811	Previously served (NC-P) June 16, 1790–91 while as a member of the House. Elected to this Congress: August 3–4, 1815. Died, as Representative-elect: September 24, 1815.
38	John Culpepper	F	NC-7	March 4, 1813	Previously served (F) 1807 – January 2, 1808, and February 23, 1808–09 while as a member of the House. Elected to this Congress: August 10, 1815. Last term while serving as a member of the House until 16th Congress.
Three consecutive terms
39	Elijah Brigham	F	MA-11	March 4, 1811	Died while still serving as a member of the House: February 22, 1816
40	John C. Calhoun	DR	SC-6	March 4, 1811	
41	Lewis Condict	DR	NJ-al	March 4, 1811	Chairman: Revisal and Unfinished Business. Chairman: Expenditures on Public Buildings. Last term while serving as a member of the House until 17th Congress.
42	Bolling Hall	DR	GA-al	March 4, 1811	Last term while serving as a member of the House.
43	Aylett Hawes	DR	VA-10	March 4, 1811	Elected to this Congress: April 1815. Last term while serving as a member of the House.
44	William R. King	DR	NC-5	March 4, 1811	Elected to this Congress: August 10, 1815. Resigned while still serving as a member of the House: November 4, 1816.
45	Lyman Law	F	CT-al	March 4, 1811	Last term while serving as a member of the House.
46	William Lowndes	DR	SC-2	March 4, 1811	Chairman: Ways and Means
47	William McCoy	DR	VA-4	March 4, 1811	Elected to this Congress: April 1815
48	Hugh Nelson	DR	VA-22	March 4, 1811	Elected to this Congress: April 1815. Chairman: Judiciary.
49	Israel Pickens	DR	NC-12	March 4, 1811	Elected to this Congress: August 10, 1815. Chairman: Public Expenditures (1816–17). Last term while serving as a member of the House.
50	William Piper	DR	PA-8	March 4, 1811	Last term while serving as a member of the House.
51	James Pleasants	DR	VA-17	March 4, 1811	Elected to this Congress: April 1815
52	Philip Stuart	F	MD-1	March 4, 1811	
53	Stevenson Archer	DR	MD-6	October 26, 1811	Chairman: Expenditures in the Navy Department (1816–17). Last term while serving as a member of the House until the 16th Congress.
54	Henry Clay	DR	KY-2	March 4, 1815	Previously served (DR) 1811 – January 19, 1814, while as a member of the House. Seat declared vacant, as Representative-elect: 1815. Last term while serving as a member of the House until re-elected to 14th Congress.
55	Thomas B. Robertson	DR	LA-al	April 30, 1812	Chairman: Public Lands
56	John P. Hungerford	DR	VA-9	March 4, 1813	Previously served (DR) March 4 – November 29, 1811, while as a member of the House. Elected to this Congress: April 1815. Last term while serving as a member of the House.
57	Thomas P. Grosvenor	F	NY-5	January 29, 1813	Last term while serving as a member of the House.
Three non-consecutive terms
58	George Baer, Jr.	F	MD-4	March 4, 1815	Previously served (F) 1797–1801 while as a member of the House. Last term while serving as a member of the House.
59	Jonathan Fisk	DR	NY-6	March 4, 1813	Previously served (DR) 1809–11 while as a member of the House. Resigned, as Representative-elect: March 1815.
60	Thomas R. Gold	F	NY-16	March 4, 1815	Previously served (F) 1809–13 while as a member of the House. Last term while serving as a member of the House.
61	William Hale	F	NH-al	March 4, 1813	Previously served (F) 1809–11. Last term while serving as a member of the House.
62	William Milnor	F	PA-1	March 4, 1815	Previously served 1807–11 while as a member of the House. Last term while serving as a member of the House until 17th Congress.
63	Peter B. Porter	DR	NY-21	March 4, 1815	Previously served (DR) 1809–13 while as a member of the House. Resigned while still serving as a member of the House: January 23, 1816.
64	Stephen Ormsby	DR	KY-8	April 20, 1813	Previously served (DR) 1811–13 while as a member of the House. Last term while serving as a member of the House.
65	William Baylies	F	MA-8	March 4, 1813	Previously served (F) March 4 – June 28, 1809, while as a member of the House. Last term while serving as a member of the House until 23rd Congress.
Two consecutive terms
66	John Alexander	DR	OH-2	March 4, 1813	Last term while serving as a member of the House.
67	George Bradbury	F	MA-15	March 4, 1813	Last term while serving as a member of the House.
68	James Caldwell	DR	OH-4	March 4, 1813	Last term while serving as a member of the House.
69	John J. Chappell	DR	SC-4	March 4, 1813	Chairman: Pensions and Revolutionary Claims. Last term.
70	Bradbury Cilley	F	NH-al	March 4, 1813	Last term while serving as a member of the House.
71	James Clark	DR	KY-1	March 4, 1813	Resigned 1816. Last term while as a member of the House until 19th Congress.
72	Oliver C. Comstock	DR	NY-20	March 4, 1813	
73	Thomas Cooper	F	DE-al	March 4, 1813	Last term while serving in the House.
74	John Forsyth	DR	GA-al	March 4, 1813	
75	William Gaston	F	NC-4	March 4, 1813	Elected to this Congress: August 10, 1815. Last term while serving in the House.
76	Hugh Glasgow	DR	PA-4	March 4, 1813	Last term while serving in the House.
77	Alexander C. Hanson	F	MD-3	March 4, 1813	Resigned, as Representative-elect: October 1816
78	Samuel D. Ingham	DR	PA-6	March 4, 1813	Chairman: Post Office and Post Roads
79	Jared Irwin	DR	PA-10	March 4, 1813	Last term while serving as a member of the House
80	James Johnson	DR	VA-20	March 4, 1813	Elected to this Congress: April 1815
81	Moss Kent	F	NY-18	March 4, 1813	Last term while serving as a member of the House
82	James Kilbourne	DR	OH-5	March 4, 1813	Last term while serving as a member of the House
83	Cyrus King	F	MA-14	March 4, 1813	Last term while serving as a member of the House
84	John Lovett	F	NY-9	March 4, 1813	Last term while serving as a member of the House
85	John McLean	DR	OH-1	March 4, 1813	Chairman: Accounts (1815–16). Resigned in 1816 while still serving as a member of the House
86	Hosea Moffitt	F	NY-10	March 4, 1813	Last term while serving as a member of the House
87	William H. Murfree	DR	NC-1	March 4, 1813	Elected to this Congress: August 10, 1815. Chairman: Public Expenditures (1815–16). Last term while serving as a member of the House.
88	Timothy Pickering	F	MA-2	March 4, 1813	Last term while serving as a member of the House.
89	John Reed, Jr.	F	MA-9	March 4, 1813	Last term while serving as a member of the House until 17th Congress
90	Nathaniel Ruggles	F	MA-13	March 4, 1813	
91	Solomon P. Sharp	DR	KY-6	March 4, 1813	Chairman: Private Land Claims (1816–17). Last term while serving as a member of the House.
92	William S. Smith	F	NY-17	March 4, 1813	Unseated, as Representative-elect, on election contest: December 13, 1815.
93	John W. Taylor	DR	NY-11	March 4, 1813	Chairman: Elections
94	Thomas Telfair	DR	GA-al	March 4, 1813	Last term while serving as a member of the House
95	Roger Vose	F	NH-al	March 4, 1813	Last term while serving as a member of the House.
96	Artemas Ward, Jr.	F	MA-1	March 4, 1813	Last term while serving as a member of the House.
97	Thomas Ward	DR	NJ-al	March 4, 1813	Last term while serving as a member of the House.
98	Daniel Webster	F	NH-al	March 4, 1813	Last term while serving as a member of the House.
99	Jeduthun Wilcox	F	NH-al	March 4, 1813	Last term while serving as a member of the House.
100	Bartlett Yancey	DR	NC-9	March 4, 1813	Elected to this Congress: August 10, 1815. Chairman: Claims. Last term while serving as a member of the House.
101	William Creighton, Jr.	DR	OH-3	May 4, 1813	Last term while serving as a member of the House until 20th Congress
102	Thomas Wilson	DR	PA-15	May 4, 1813	Last term while serving as a member of the House
103	Isaac Griffin	DR	PA-13	May 24, 1813	Last term while serving as a member of the House
104	Alfred Cuthbert	DR	GA-al	December 13, 1813	Resigned: November 9, 1816. Last term while serving as a member of the House until 17th Congress.
105	William Irving	DR	NY-2	January 22, 1814	
106	Newton Cannon	DR	TN-5	September 16, 1814	Elected to this Congress: August 3–4, 1815. Chairman: Expenditures in the Post Office Department (1816–17). Last term while serving as a member of the House until 16th Congress.
107	Philip P. Barbour	DR	VA-11	September 19, 1814	Elected to this Congress: April 1815
108	John W. Hulbert	F	MA-7	September 26, 1814	Last term while serving as a member of the House.
109	David Clendenin	DR	OH-6	October 11, 1814	Last term while serving as a member of the House.
Two non-consecutive terms
110	Jeremiah Nelson	F	MA-3	March 4, 1815	Previously served (F) 1805–07 while serving as a member of the House.
111	Benjamin Pond	DR	NY-12	March 4, 1815	Previously served (DR) 1811–13 while as a member of the House. Died, as Representative-elect: October 6, 1814.
112	John Ross	DR	PA-6	March 4, 1815	Previously served (DR) 1809–11 while serving as a member of the House
113	William Pinkney	DR	MD-5	March 4, 1815	Previously served (P) March 4-November, 1791 while as a member of the House. Resigned on April 18, 1816, while still serving as a member of the House.
One term
114	John Adams	DR	NY-8	March 4, 1815	Unseated, as Representative-elect, after election contest: December 26, 1815. Only term while serving as a member of the House until 23rd Congress.
115	Charles H. Atherton	F	NH-al	March 4, 1815	Only term while serving as a member of the House
116	Ezra Baker	DR	NJ-al	March 4, 1815	Only term while serving as a member of the House
117	Ephraim Bateman	DR	NJ-al	March 4, 1815	
118	Benjamin Bennet	DR	NJ-al	March 4, 1815	
119	Samuel Betts	DR	NY-7	March 4, 1815	Only term while serving as a member of the House
120	James Birdsall	DR	NY-15	March 4, 1815	Only term while serving as a member of the House
121	Victory Birdseye	DR	NY-19	March 4, 1815	Only term while serving as a member of the House until 27th Congress
122	John L. Boss, Jr.	F	RI-al	March 4, 1815	
123	Micah Brooks	DR	NY-21	March 4, 1815	Only term while serving as a member of the House
124	Benjamin Brown	F	MA-16	March 4, 1815	Only term while serving as a member of the House
125	Joseph H. Bryan	DR	NC-2	March 4, 1815	Elected to this Congress: August 10, 1815
126	Daniel Cady	F	NY-14	March 4, 1815	Only term while serving as a member of the House
127	James Carr	F	MA-17	March 4, 1815	Only term while serving as a member of the House
128	Daniel Chipman	F	VT-al	March 4, 1815	Resigned on May 5, 1816, while still serving as a member of the House.
129	James W. Clark	DR	NC-3	March 4, 1815	Elected to this Congress: August 10, 1815. Only term while serving as a member of the House.
130	Thomas Clayton	F	DE-al	March 4, 1815	Only term while serving as a member of the House.
131	Samuel S. Conner	DR	MA-19	March 4, 1815	Only term while serving as a member of the House.
132	Henry Crocheron	DR	NY-1	March 4, 1815	Only term while serving as a member of the House.
133	William Darlington	DR	PA-2	March 4, 1815	Only term while serving as a member of the House until 16th Congress
134	Amos Ellmaker	DR	PA-3	March 4, 1815	Resigned as Representative-elect: July 3, 1815
135	Daniel M. Forney	DR	NC-11	March 4, 1815	Elected to this Congress: August 10, 1815
136	John Hahn	DR	PA-2	March 4, 1815	Only term while serving as a member of the House.
137	Jabez D. Hammond	DR	NY-15	March 4, 1815	Only term while serving as a member of the House.
138	Benjamin Hardin	DR	KY-10	March 4, 1815	Only term while serving as a member of the House until 16th Congress
139	Bennett H. Henderson	DR	TN-4	March 4, 1815	Elected to this Congress: August 3–4, 1815. Only term.
140	John C. Herbert	F	MD-2	March 4, 1815	
141	Joseph Hopkinson	F	PA-1	March 4, 1815	
142	Luther Jewett	F	VT-al	March 4, 1815	Only term while serving as a member of the House.
143	Chauncey Langdon	F	VT-al	March 4, 1815	Only term while serving as a member of the House.
144	William C. Love	DR	NC-10	March 4, 1815	Elected to this Congress: August 10, 1815. Only term.
145	Wilson Lumpkin	DR	GA-al	March 4, 1815	Only term while serving as a member of the House until 20th Congress
146	Asa Lyon	F	VT-al	March 4, 1815	Only term while serving as a member of the House
147	William Maclay	DR	PA-5	March 4, 1815	
148	Charles Marsh	F	VT-al	March 4, 1815	Only term while serving as a member of the House
149	James B. Mason	F	RI-al	March 4, 1815	
150	William Mayrant	DR	SC-9	March 4, 1815	Resigned on October 21, 1816, while still serving as a member of the House
151	Alney McLean	DR	KY-5	March 4, 1815	Only term while serving as a member of the House until 16th Congress
152	Henry Middleton	DR	SC-1	March 4, 1815	
153	Elijah H. Mills	F	MA-5	March 4, 1815	
154	John Noyes	F	VT-al	March 4, 1815	Only term while serving as a member of the House
155	Albion K. Parris	DR	MA-20	March 4, 1815	
156	Samuel Powell	DR	TN-1	March 4, 1815	Elected to this Congress: August 3–4, 1815. Only term while serving as a member of the House
157	James B. Reynolds	DR	TN-6	March 4, 1815	Elected to this Congress: August 3–4, 1815. Only term until 18th Congress while serving as a member of the House
158	Thomas Rice	F	MA-18	March 4, 1815	
159	William H. Roane	DR	VA-12	March 4, 1815	Elected to this Congress: April 1815. Only term while serving as a member of the House.
160	John Savage	DR	NY-12	March 4, 1815	
161	Abraham H. Schenck	DR	NY-4	March 4, 1815	Only term while serving as a member of the House.
162	Ballard Smith	DR	VA-7	March 4, 1815	Elected to this Congress: April 1815
163	Thomas Smith	F	PA-1	March 4, 1815	Only term while serving as a member of the House.
164	Asahel Stearns	F	MA-4	March 4, 1815	Only term while serving as a member of the House.
165	Solomon Strong	F	MA-12	March 4, 1815	
166	Magnus Tate	F	VA-2	March 4, 1815	Elected to this Congress: April 1815. Only term while serving as a member of the House.
167	Micah Taul	DR	KY-9	March 4, 1815	Only term while serving as a member of the House.
168	John Taylor	DR	SC-7	March 4, 1815	Only term while serving as a member of the House.
169	Isaac Thomas	DR	TN-3	March 4, 1815	Elected to this Congress: August 3–4, 1815. Only term while serving as a member of the House.
170	Enos T. Throop	DR	NY-20	March 4, 1815	Resigned while still serving as a member of the House: June 4, 1816
171	George Townsend	DR	NY-1	March 4, 1815	
172	Henry S. Tucker	DR	VA-3	March 4, 1815	Elected to this Congress: April 1815. Chairman: District of Columbia.
173	Jonathan Ward	DR	NY-3	March 4, 1815	Only term while serving as a member of the House.
174	Peter H. Wendover	DR	NY-2	March 4, 1815	
175	John Whiteside	DR	PA-3	March 4, 1815	
176	Richard H. Wilde	DR	GA-al	March 4, 1815	Only term while serving as a member of the House until 18th Congress
177	Jonathan Williams	F	PA-1	March 4, 1815	Died, as Representative-elect: May 16, 1815
178	Lewis Williams	DR	NC-13	March 4, 1815	Elected to this Congress: August 10, 1815
179	William Wilson	DR	PA-10	March 4, 1815	
180	John Woods	F	PA-14	March 4, 1815	Only term while serving in the House.
181	William Woodward	DR	SC-5	March 4, 1815	Only term while serving in the House.
182	John B. Yates	DR	NY-13	March 4, 1815	Chairman: Expenditures in the State Department (1816–17). Only term while serving as a member of the House.
Members joining the House, after the start of the Congress
...	Asa Adgate	DR	NY-12	June 7, 1815	Special election: April 25–27, 1815. Last term while serving in the House.
...	James W. Wilkin	DR	NY-6	June 7, 1815	Special election: April 25–27, 1815
...	Thomas Burnside	DR	PA-9	October 10, 1815	Special election. Resigned while still serving as a member of the House: April 1816.
...	John Sergeant	F	PA-1	October 10, 1815	Special election
...	James M. Wallace	DR	PA-3	October 10, 1815	Special election
...	Henry Clay	DR	KY-2	October 30, 1815	Previously served (DR) 1811 – January 19, 1814, and 1815. Special election (to replace himself). Speaker of the House.
...	John Kerr	DR	VA-15	October 30, 1815	Previously served (DR) 1813–15. Special election: October 15–16, 23, 1815. Last term while serving as a member of the House.
...	William G. Blount	DR	TN-2	December 8, 1815	Special election: December 7–8, 1815
...	Westel Willoughby, Jr.	DR	NY-17	December 13, 1815	Seated after election contest. Only term while serving in the House.
...	Erastus Root	DR	NY-8	December 26, 1815	Previously served (DR) 1803–05 and 1809–11 while as a member of the House. Seated after election contest. Chairman: Expenditures in the War Department (1816–17). Last term while serving as a member of the House until 22nd Congress.
...	Samuel Smith	DR	MD-5	January 31, 1816	Previously served (A) 1793–95 and (DR) 1795–1803 while as a member of the House. Special election: January 27, 1816. Chairman: Expenditures in the Treasury Department (1816–17).
...	Weldon N. Edwards	DR	NC-6	February 7, 1816	Special election: January 22, 1816
...	Peter Little	DR	MD-5	September 2, 1816	Previously served (DR) 1811–13 while as a member of the House. Special election: September 3, 1816. Chairman: Accounts (1816–17).
...	Daniel Avery	DR	NY-20	September 30, 1816	Previously served (DR) 1811–15. Special election: August 27–29, 1816. Last term while serving as a member of the House.
...	George Peter	F	MD-3	October 7, 1816	Special election
...	William H. Harrison	DR	OH-1	October 8, 1816	Previously served as Northwest Territory Delegate 1799 – May 14, 1800. Special election.
...	William P. Maclay	DR	PA-9	October 8, 1816	Special election
...	Benjamin Adams	F	MA-11	December 2, 1816	Special election: August 26, 1816
...	Archibald S. Clarke	DR	NY-21	December 2, 1816	Special election: April 30 – May 2, 1816. Only term while serving as a member of the House.
...	Zadock Cook	DR	GA-al	December 2, 1816	Special election
...	Samuel Dickens	DR	NC-8	December 2, 1816	Special election: August 8, 1816. Only term while serving as a member of the House.
...	Thomas Fletcher	DR	KY-1	December 2, 1816	Special election: August 5, 1816. Only term while serving as a member of the House.
...	Charles Hooks	DR	NC-5	December 2, 1816	Special election: August 8, 1816. Only term while serving as a member of the House until 16th Congress.
...	Thomas M. Nelson	DR	VA-18	December 4, 1816	Special election: October 1816
183	William Hendricks	DR	IN-al	December 11, 1816	First Representative from new state. Elected to this Congress: August 5, 1816.
...	John Tyler	DR	VA-23	December 17, 1816	Special election: November 1816
...	Stephen D. Miller	DR	SC-9	January 2, 1817	Special election: November 25–26, 1816
Non voting members
a	Jonathan Jennings	-	IN-al	November 27, 1809	Delegate from Indiana Territory. IN admitted: December 11, 1816. Last term until Representative in 17th Congress.
b	William Lattimore	-	MS-al	March 4, 1813	Delegate from Mississippi Territory. Formerly served 1803–07. Last term while serving in the House.
c	Rufus Easton	-	MO-al	September 17, 1814	Delegate from Missouri Territory until August 6, 1816.
d	Benjamin Stephenson	-	IL-al	November 4, 1814	Delegate from Illinois Territory until term expired. Last term while serving in the House.
e	John Scott	-	MO-al	August 6, 1816	Delegate from Missouri Territory until unseated: January 13, 1817.
f	Nathaniel Pope	-	IL-al	September 5, 1816	Delegate from Illinois Territory

== See also ==
- 14th United States Congress
- List of United States congressional districts
- List of United States senators in the 14th Congress
