= Teter Creek =

Stream in West Virginia, U.S.

Coordinates: 39°13′05″N 79°56′15″W

Teter Creek is a stream in the U.S. state of West Virginia. It is a tributary to the Tygart Valley River.

Teter Creek was named in the late 18th century most likely after a member of the pioneer Teter family. Variant names are "Ryans Mill Run", "Teter's Creek", and "Teters Creek".
