= List of congressional opponents of the Vietnam War =

This is a list of U.S. senators and representatives who opposed the Vietnam War. This includes those who initially supported the war, but later changed their stance to a strong opposition to it.

== Senate ==
Senator	Party (at opposition)	State	Term (at opposition)		Ref.
Senator	Party (at opposition)	State	Start	End	Ref.
Frank Church	Democratic	Idaho	3 January 1957	3 January 1981	
John Sherman Cooper	Republican	Kentucky	7 November 1956	3 January 1973	
J. William Fulbright	Democratic	Arkansas	3 January 1945	31 December 1974	
Albert Gore Sr.	Democratic	Tennessee	3 January 1953	3 January 1971	
Mike Gravel	Democratic	Alaska	3 January 1969	3 January 1981	
Ernest Gruening	Democratic	Alaska	3 January 1959	3 January 1969	
Vance Hartke	Democratic	Indiana	3 January 1959	3 January 1977	
Mark Hatfield	Republican	Oregon	3 January 1967	3 January 1997	
Jacob Javits	Republican	New York	3 January 1957	3 January 1981	
Robert F. Kennedy	Democratic	New York	3 January 1965	6 June 1968	
Mike Mansfield	Democratic	Montana	3 January 1953	3 January 1977	
Charles Mathias	Republican	Maryland	3 January 1969	3 January 1987	
Eugene McCarthy	Democratic-Farmer-Labor	Minnesota	3 January 1959	3 January 1971	
George McGovern	Democratic	South Dakota	3 January 1963	3 January 1981	
Wayne Morse	Democratic	Oregon	3 January 1945	3 January 1969	
William Proxmire	Democratic	Wisconsin	28 August 1957	3 January 1989	

== House of Representatives ==
Representative	Party (at opposition)	District	Term (at opposition)		Ref.
Representative	Party (at opposition)	District	Start	End	Ref.
Bella Abzug	Democratic	NY-19	3 January 1971	3 January 1973	
Bella Abzug	Democratic	NY-20	3 January 1973	3 January 1977	
Les Aspin	Democratic	WI-01	3 January 1971	20 January 1993	
George Brown Jr.	Democratic	CA-29	3 January 1963	3 January 1971	
Phillip Burton	Democratic	CA-05	18 February 1964	3 January 1975	
Ron Dellums	Democratic	CA-07	3 January 1971	3 January 1975	
Robert Drinan	Democratic	MA-03	3 January 1971	3 January 1973	
Robert Drinan	Democratic	MA-04	3 January 1973	3 January 1981	
Ed Koch	Democratic	NY-17	3 January 1969	31 December 1973	
Ed Koch	Democratic	NY-18	3 January 1973	31 December 1977	
Paul Findley	Republican	IL-20	3 January 1963	3 January 1973	
Harold R. Gross	Republican	IA-03	3 January 1963	3 January 1975	
Allard K. Lowenstein	Democratic	NY-05	3 January 1969	3 January 1971	
Pete McCloskey	Republican	CA-11	12 December 1967	3 January 1973	
Patsy Mink	Democratic	Hawaii	3 January 1965	3 January 1977	
Tip O'Neill	Democratic	MA-08	3 January 1963	3 January 1987	
Henry S. Reuss	Democratic	WI-05	3 January 1955	3 January 1983	
Donald Riegle	Republican	MI-07	3 March 1967	30 December 1976	
James H. Scheuer	Democratic	NY-21	3 January 1965	3 January 1973	
Eugene Siler	Republican	KY-05	3 January 1963	3 January 1965	
Pete Stark	Democratic	CA-08	3 January 1973	3 January 1975	
Andrew Young	Democratic	GA-05	3 January 1973	29 January 1977	

== See also ==
- Opposition to the Vietnam War
