= List of United States representatives in the 2nd Congress =

This is a complete list of United States representatives during the 2nd United States Congress listed by seniority. For the most part, representatives are ranked by the beginning of their terms in office.

As an historical article, the districts and party affiliations listed reflect those during the 2nd Congress (March 4, 1791 – March 3, 1793). Seats and party affiliations on similar lists for other congresses will be different for certain members.

This article describes the criteria for seniority in the House of Representatives and sets out the list of members by seniority. It is prepared on the basis of the interpretation of seniority applied to the House of Representatives in the current congress. In the absence of information to the contrary, it is presumed that the twenty-first-century practice is identical to the seniority customs used during the 2nd Congress.

== House seniority ==
Seniority in the House, for representatives with unbroken service, depends on the date on which the members first term began. That date is either the start of the Congress (4 March in odd numbered years, for the era up to and including the 73rd Congress starting in 1933) or the date of a special election during the Congress. Since many members start serving on the same day as others, ranking between them is based on alphabetical order by the last name of the representative.

Representatives in early congresses were often elected after the legal start of the Congress. Such representatives are attributed with unbroken seniority, from the legal start of the congressional term, if they were the first person elected to a seat in a Congress. The date of the election is indicated in a note.

The seniority date is normally taken from the members entry in the Biographical Directory of the United States Congress, except where the date given is the legal start of the Congress and the actual election (for someone who was not the first person elected to the seat in that Congress) was later. The date of election is taken from United States Congressional Elections 1788-1997. In a few instances the latter work provides dates, for the start and end of terms, which correct those in the Biographical Directory.

The Biographical Directory normally uses the date of a special election, as the seniority date. However, mostly in early congresses, the date of the member taking his seat can be the one given. The date of the special election is mentioned in a note to the list below, when that date is not used as the seniority date by the Biographical Directory.

Representatives who return to the House, after having previously served, are credited with service equal to one less than the total number of terms they served. When a representative has served a prior term of less than two terms (i.e., prior term minus one equals less than one), he is ranked above all others whose service begins on the same day.

== Leadership ==
In this Congress the only formal leader was the speaker of the House. A speakership ballot was held on October 24, 1791, and Jonathan Trumbull, Jr. (P-CT) was elected.

== Standing committees ==
The House created its first standing committee, on April 13, 1789. There was one standing committees in the 2nd Congress.

Committees, in this period, were appointed for a session at a time and not necessarily for every one in a Congress. The speaker appointed the members.

This list refers to the standing committee of the House in the 2nd Congress, the year of establishment as a standing committee, the number of members assigned to the committee and the dates of appointment in each session, the end of the session and its chairman.

No.	Committee	From	Members	Appointed	Chairman
1	Elections	1789	7	October 26, 1791 – May 8, 1792	Samuel Livermore (P-NH)

== List of representatives by seniority ==
A numerical rank is assigned to each of the 65 members initially elected to the 2nd Congress. Other members, who were not the first person elected to a seat but who joined the House during the Congress, are not assigned a number (apart from the representatives from the two states, admitted during the Congress, who are numbered 66–70). Three representatives-elect was not sworn in, as one died and two declined to serve. The list below includes the representative-elect (with names in italics), with the seniority they would have held if they had been sworn in.

Party designations used in this article are A for Anti-Administration members and P for Pro-Administration representatives.

U.S. House seniority
Rank	Representative	Party	District	Seniority date	Notes
Two consecutive terms
1	Fisher Ames	P	MA-1	March 4, 1789	
2	Abraham Baldwin	A	GA-2	March 4, 1789	
3	Egbert Benson	P	NY-3	March 4, 1789	Last term until 13th Congress.
4	Elias Boudinot	P	NJ-al	March 4, 1789	
5	John Brown	A	VA-2	March 4, 1789	Term ended on district being admitted as the new state of KY: June 1, 1792
6	Thomas Fitzsimons	P	PA-1	March 4, 1789	Elected to this Congress: October 11, 1791
7	Elbridge Gerry	A	MA-3	March 4, 1789	Last term.
8	Nicholas Gilman	P	NH-al	March 4, 1789	
9	Benjamin Goodhue	P	MA-2	March 4, 1789	
10	Samuel Griffin	A	VA-10	March 4, 1789	Pro-Administration 1789-91
11	Thomas Hartley	P	PA-7	March 4, 1789	Elected to this Congress: October 11, 1791
12	Daniel Hiester	A	PA-4	March 4, 1789	Elected to this Congress: October 11, 1791
13	Daniel Huger	P	SC-3	March 4, 1789	Last term.
14	John Laurance	P	NY-2	March 4, 1789	Last term.
15	Richard B. Lee	P	VA-4	March 4, 1789	Last term.
16	George Leonard	P	MA-6	March 4, 1789	Elected to this Congress on April 2, 1792. Last term until 4th Congress.
17	Samuel Livermore	P	NH-al	March 4, 1789	Anti-Administration 1789–91. Chairman: Elections. Last term.
18	James Madison	A	VA-5	March 4, 1789	
19	Andrew Moore	A	VA-3	March 4, 1789	
20	Frederick Muhlenberg	A	PA-2	March 4, 1789	Elected to this Congress: October 11, 1791. Pro-Administration 1789–91.
21	John Page	A	VA-7	March 4, 1789	
22	Josiah Parker	A	VA-8	March 4, 1789	
23	Theodore Sedgwick	P	MA-4	March 4, 1789	
24	Joshua Seney	A	MD-2	March 4, 1789	Resigned on December 6, 1792.
25	Roger Sherman	P	CT-al	March 4, 1789	Resigned, as Representative-elect, before taking his seat as a US Senator on June 13, 1791
26	Peter Silvester	P	NY-5	March 4, 1789	Last term.
27	William L. Smith	P	SC-1	March 4, 1789	
28	Jonathan Sturges	P	CT-al	March 4, 1789	Last term(elected to 3rd Congress but declined to serve)
29	Thomas Sumter	A	SC-4	March 4, 1789	Last term until 5th Congress.
30	George Thatcher	P	MA-8	March 4, 1789	Elected for this Congress: April 4, 1791
31	Jonathan Trumbull, Jr.	P	CT-al	March 4, 1789	Speaker of the House
32	Thomas T. Tucker	A	SC-5	March 4, 1789	Last term.
33	John Vining	P	DE-al	March 4, 1789	Last term.
...	Jeremiah Wadsworth	P	CT-al	March 4, 1789	Re-elected by special election before the start of this Congress
34	Alexander White	P	VA-1	March 4, 1789	Last term.
35	Hugh Williamson	A	NC-4	March 19, 1790	Last term.
36	John B. Ashe	A	NC-3	March 24, 1790	Last term.
37	John Steele	P	NC-1	April 19, 1790	Last term.
38	William B. Giles	A	VA-9	December 7, 1790	
39	Benjamin Bourne	P	RI-al	December 17, 1790	
One term
40	Robert Barnwell	P	SC-2	March 4, 1791	Only term (elected to 4th Congress but declined to serve)
41	Shearjashub Bourne	P	MA-5	March 4, 1791	
42	Abraham Clark	P	NJ-al	March 4, 1791	
43	Jonathan Dayton	P	NJ-al	March 4, 1791	
44	Pierpont Edwards	-	CT-al	March 4, 1791	Declined to serve, as Representative-elect: November 10, 1790
45	William Findley	A	PA-8	March 4, 1791	Elected to this Congress: October 11, 1791
46	James Gordon	P	NY-6	March 4, 1791	
47	Andrew Gregg	A	PA-6	March 4, 1791	Elected to this Congress: October 11, 1791
48	William B. Grove	P	NC-5	March 4, 1791	
49	James Hillhouse	P	CT-al	March 4, 1791	
50	Israel Jacobs	P	PA-3	March 4, 1791	Elected to this Congress: October 11, 1791. Only term.
51	Philip Key	P	MD-1	March 4, 1791	Only term.
52	Aaron Kitchell	P	NJ-al	March 4, 1791	Only term until seated in the 3rd Congress.
53	John W. Kittera	P	PA-5	March 4, 1791	Elected to this Congress: October 11, 1791
54	Nathaniel Macon	A	NC-2	March 4, 1791	
55	William V. Murray	P	MD-5	March 4, 1791	
56	William Pinkney	P	MD-3	March 4, 1791	Resigned in November 1791. Only term until 14th Congress.
57	Cornelius C. Schoonmaker	A	NY-4	March 4, 1791	Only term.
58	Upton Sheredine	A	MD-6	March 4, 1791	Only term.
59	Jeremiah Smith	P	NH-al	March 4, 1791	
60	Samuel Sterett	A	MD-4	March 4, 1791	Only term.
61	James Townsend	-	NY-1	March 4, 1791	Died, as Representative-elect: May 24, 1790
62	Abraham B. Venable	A	VA-6	March 4, 1791	
63	Artemas Ward	P	MA-7	March 4, 1791	
64	Anthony Wayne	A	GA-1	March 4, 1791	Seat declared vacant on March 21, 1792. Only term.
65	Francis Willis	A	GA-3	March 4, 1791	Only term.
Members joining the House, after the start of the Congress
...	Amasa Learned	P	CT-al	September 19, 1791	Special election
66	Nathaniel Niles	A	VT-2	October 17, 1791	Representative from a new state
67	Israel Smith	A	VT-1	October 17, 1791	Representative from a new state
...	Thomas Tredwell	A	NY-1	October 24, 1791	Special election April 26–28, 1791
...	John F. Mercer	A	MD-3	February 5, 1792	Special election
68	Alexander D. Orr	A	KY-2	November 8, 1792	Representative from a new state
69	Christopher Greenup	A	KY-1	November 9, 1792	Representative from a new state
...	John Milledge	A	GA-1	November 22, 1792	Special election. Only term until 4th Congress.
...	William Hindman	P	MD-2	January 30, 1793	Special election

== See also ==
- 2nd United States Congress
- List of United States congressional districts
- List of United States senators in the 2nd Congress
