= James Gunn (disambiguation) =

James Gunn (born 1966) is an American filmmaker.

James Gunn may also refer to:

- James E. Gunn (1923–2020), American science fiction scholar and writer
- James Andrew Gunn (1882–1958), British medical doctor, founder of the British Pharmacological Society
- James Gunn (astronomer) (born 1938), American astronomer
- James Gunn (explorer) of Scotland, member of Henry Sinclair's survey expedition
- James Gunn (Idaho politician) (1843–1911), American congressman from Idaho
- James Gunn (Georgia politician) (1753–1801), United States senator from Georgia
  - SS James Gunn, a Liberty ship
- James Gunn (Australian politician), Tasmanian politician from the electoral district of Sorell (1872–1882)
- James Gunn (screenwriter, born 1920) (1920–1966), American film and television screenwriter

== See also ==
- Herbert James Gunn (1893–1964), Scottish landscape and portrait painter
