= List of United States representatives in the 1st Congress =

This is a complete list of United States representatives during the 1st United States Congress listed by seniority.

As a historical article, the districts and party affiliations listed reflect those during the 1st Congress (March 4, 1789 – March 3, 1791). Seats and party affiliations on similar lists for other congresses will be different for certain members. (Note: Representatives are voting members of the United States House of Representatives and delegates are non-voting members.)

== House seniority ==
Seniority depends on the date on which members were sworn into office. Representatives in early congresses were often elected after the legal start of the Congress. Such representatives are attributed with unbroken seniority, from the legal start of the congressional term, if they were the first person elected to a seat in a Congress. The date of the election is indicated in a note.

The seniority date is normally taken from the members entry in the Biographical Directory of the United States Congress, except where the date given is the legal start of the Congress and the actual election (for someone who was not the first person elected to the seat in that Congress) was later. The date of election is taken from United States Congressional Elections 1788-1997. In a few instances the latter work provides dates, for the start and end of terms, which correct those in the Biographical Directory.

The Biographical Directory normally uses the date of a special election, as the seniority date. However, mostly in early congresses, the date of the member taking his seat can be the one given. The date of the special election is mentioned in a note to the list below, when that date is not used as the seniority date by the Biographical Directory.

In the 1st Congress the only formal leader was the speaker of the House. This congress had only one standing committee, the Committee on Elections, created on April 13, 1789. There was also a Ways and Means Committee for part of the 1st session. Although the Ways and Means Committee was not formally added to the list of standing committees until 1802, the present-day committee considers the one established in 1789 to be its forerunner. Committees, in this period, were appointed for a session at a time and not necessarily for every one in a Congress. Apart from the members of the Elections Committee in the 1st session (who were selected by balloting the House), the speaker appointed the members. The office of speaker and other party or committee leadership positions in the House are often associated with seniority. However, leadership is typically not associated with seniority.

== U.S. House seniority list ==
A numerical rank is assigned to each of the 65 members initially elected to the 1st Congress. Other members, who were not the first person elected to a seat but who joined the House during the Congress, are not assigned a number (apart from the representatives from the two states, admitted after ratifying the constitution during the Congress, who are numbered 60–65). One representative-elect was not sworn in, as he declined to serve. The list below includes that representative-elect (with name in italics), with the seniority he would have held if he had been sworn in.

Rank	Representative	Party	District	Seniority date	Notes
1	Fisher Ames	Pro-Administration	Massachusetts 1	March 4, 1789	Chairman: Elections (1790)
2	Abraham Baldwin	Anti-Administration	Georgia 2	March 4, 1789	
3	Egbert Benson	Pro-Administration	New York 3	March 4, 1789	Elected March 3–5, 1789
4	Theodorick Bland	Anti-Administration	Virginia 9	March 4, 1789	Died June 1, 1790
5	Elias Boudinot	Pro-Administration	New Jersey at-large	March 4, 1789	Elected February 11-April 27, 1789
6	John Brown	Anti-Administration	Virginia 2	March 4, 1789	
7	Aedanus Burke	Anti-Administration	South Carolina 2	March 4, 1789	
8	Lambert Cadwalader	Pro-Administration	New Jersey at-large	March 4, 1789	
9	Daniel Carroll	Pro-Administration	Maryland 6	March 4, 1789	
10	George Clymer	Pro-Administration	Pennsylvania at-large	March 4, 1789	
11	Isaac Coles	Anti-Administration	Virginia 6	March 4, 1789	
12	Benjamin Contee	Anti-Administration	Maryland 3	March 4, 1789	
13	Thomas Fitzsimons	Pro-Administration	Pennsylvania at-large	March 4, 1789	Chairman: Ways and Means (July 24-September 17, 1789)
14	William Floyd	Anti-Administration	New York 1	March 4, 1789	
15	George Gale	Pro-Administration	Maryland 5	March 4, 1789	
16	Elbridge Gerry	Anti-Administration	Massachusetts 3	March 4, 1789	
17	Nicholas Gilman	Pro-Administration	New Hampshire at-large	March 4, 1789	
18	Benjamin Goodhue	Pro-Administration	Massachusetts 2	March 4, 1789	
19	Samuel Griffin	Pro-Administration	Virginia 10	March 4, 1789	
20	Jonathan Grout	Anti-Administration	Massachusetts 8	March 4, 1789	
21	Thomas Hartley	Pro-Administration	Pennsylvania at-large	March 4, 1789	
22	John Hathorn	Anti-Administration	New York 4	March 4, 1789	
23	Daniel Hiester	Anti-Administration	Pennsylvania at-large	March 4, 1789	
24	Daniel Huger	Pro-Administration	South Carolina 3	March 4, 1789	
25	Benjamin Huntington	Pro-Administration	Connecticut at-large	March 4, 1789	
26	James Jackson	Anti-Administration	Georgia 1	March 4, 1789	
27	John Laurance	Pro-Administration	New York 2	March 4, 1789	Elected March 3–5, 1789
28	Richard B. Lee	Pro-Administration	Virginia 4	March 4, 1789	
29	George Leonard	Pro-Administration	Massachusetts 7	March 4, 1789	
30	Samuel Livermore	Anti-Administration	New Hampshire at-large	March 4, 1789	
31	James Madison	Anti-Administration	Virginia 5	March 4, 1789	
32	George Mathews	Anti-Administration	Georgia 3	March 4, 1789	
33	Andrew Moore	Anti-Administration	Virginia 3	March 4, 1789	
34	Frederick Muhlenberg	Pro-Administration	Pennsylvania at-large	March 4, 1789	Speaker of the House, elected April 1, 1789
35	Peter Muhlenberg	Anti-Administration	Pennsylvania at-large	March 4, 1789	
36	John Page	Anti-Administration	Virginia 7	March 4, 1789	
37	Josiah Parker	Anti-Administration	Virginia 8	March 4, 1789	
38	George Partridge	Pro-Administration	Massachusetts 5	March 4, 1789	Resigned August 14, 1790
39	James Schureman	Pro-Administration	New Jersey at-large	March 4, 1789	
40	Thomas Scott	Pro-Administration	Pennsylvania at-large	March 4, 1789	
41	Theodore Sedgwick	Pro-Administration	Massachusetts 4	March 4, 1789	Elected May 11, 1789
42	Joshua Seney	Anti-Administration	Maryland 2	March 4, 1789	
43	Roger Sherman	Pro-Administration	Connecticut at-large	March 4, 1789	
44	Peter Silvester	Pro-Administration	New York 5	March 4, 1789	Elected March 3–5, 1789
45	Thomas Sinnickson	Pro-Administration	New Jersey at-large	March 4, 1789	
46	William Smith	Anti-Administration	Maryland 4	March 4, 1789	
47	William L. Smith	Pro-Administration	South Carolina 1	March 4, 1789	
48	Michael J. Stone	Anti-Administration	Maryland 1	March 4, 1789	
49	Jonathan Sturges	Pro-Administration	Connecticut at-large	March 4, 1789	
50	Thomas Sumter	Anti-Administration	South Carolina 4	March 4, 1789	
51	George Thatcher	Pro-Administration	Massachusetts 6	March 4, 1789	
52	Jonathan Trumbull, Jr.	Pro-Administration	Connecticut at-large	March 4, 1789	
53	Thomas T. Tucker	Anti-Administration	South Carolina 5	March 4, 1789	
54	Jeremiah Van Rensselaer	Anti-Administration	New York 6	March 4, 1789	
55	John Vining	Pro-Administration	Delaware at-large	March 4, 1789	
56	Jeremiah Wadsworth	Pro-Administration	Connecticut at-large	March 4, 1789	
57	Benjamin West	n/a	New Hampshire at-large	March 4, 1789	Representative-elect, who declined to serve, probably in May 1789
58	Alexander White	Pro-Administration	Virginia 1	March 4, 1789	
59	Henry Wynkoop	Pro-Administration	Pennsylvania at-large	March 4, 1789	
Members joining the House, after the start of the Congress
...	Abiel Foster	Pro-Administration	New Hampshire at-large	June 22, 1789	
60	Hugh Williamson	Anti-Administration	North Carolina 2	March 19, 1790	Took seat from newly represented state
61	John B. Ashe	Anti-Administration	North Carolina 1	March 24, 1790	Took seat from newly represented state
62	Timothy Bloodworth	Anti-Administration	North Carolina 3	April 6, 1790	
63	John Steele	Pro-Administration	North Carolina 4	April 19, 1790	Took seat from newly represented state
64	John Sevier	Pro-Administration	North Carolina 5	June 16, 1790	
...	William B. Giles	Anti-Administration	Virginia 9	December 7, 1790	Special election
65	Benjamin Bourne	Pro-Administration	Rhode Island at-large	December 17, 1790	Elected August 31, 1790. Took seat from newly represented state.

== See also ==
- 1st United States Congress
- List of United States congressional districts
- List of United States senators in the 1st Congress
