= List of United States senators in the 2nd Congress =

This is a complete list of United States senators during the 2nd United States Congress listed by seniority from March 4, 1791, to March 3, 1793.

The order of service is based on the commencement of the senator's first term, with senators entering service the same day ranked alphabetically. The Senate subsequently assigned a consecutive official number to each senator, which is the second number given in the table.

During this time, there were no official parties, but senators are labeled as Pro-Administration (P), and Anti-Administration (A).

== Terms of service ==
Class	Terms of service of senators that expired in years
Class 2	Terms of service of senators that expired in 1793 (DE, GA, KY, MA, NC, NH, NJ, RI, SC, and VA.)
Class 3	Terms of service of senators that expired in 1795 (CT, DE, MD, NH, NJ, NY, PA, RI, SC, and VT.)
Class 1	Terms of service of senators that expired in 1797 (CT, GA, IN, KY, MA, MD, NC, NY, PA, VA, and VT.)

== U.S. Senate seniority list ==
Rank	Historical rank	Senator (party-state)	Seniority date
1	1	Richard Bassett (A-DE)	March 4, 1789
2	2	Pierce Butler (A-SC)	March 4, 1789
3	3	Charles Carroll (F-MD)	March 4, 1789
4	5	Oliver Ellsworth (F-CT)	March 4, 1789
5	7	William Few (A-GA)	March 4, 1789
6	9	James Gunn (A-GA)	March 4, 1789
7	10	John Henry (F-MD)	March 4, 1789
8	11	Ralph Izard (F-SC)	March 4, 1789
9	12	William Samuel Johnson (F-CT)	March 4, 1789
10	13	John Langdon (F-NH)	March 4, 1789
11	14	Richard Henry Lee (A-VA)	March 4, 1789
12	16	Robert Morris (F-PA)	March 4, 1789
13	18	George Read (F-DE)	March 4, 1789
14	20	Caleb Strong (F-MA)	March 4, 1789
15	21	Paine Wingate (A-NH)	March 4, 1789
16	22	Rufus King (F-NY)	July 16, 1789
17	23	Benjamin Hawkins (F-NC)	November 27, 1789
18	24	Samuel Johnston (F-NC)	November 27, 1789
19	26	Theodore Foster (F-RI)	June 7, 1790
20	27	Joseph Stanton IV (A-RI)	June 7, 1790
21	28	James Monroe (A-VA)	November 9, 1790
22	29	Philemon Dickinson (F-NJ)	November 23, 1790
23	30	Aaron Burr (A-NY)	March 4, 1791
24	31	George Cabot (F-MA)	March 4, 1791
25	32	John Rutherfurd (F-NJ)	March 4, 1791
	33	Roger Sherman (F-CT)	June 13, 1791
26	34	Stephen Row Bradley (A-VT)	October 17, 1791
27	35	Moses Robinson (A-VT)	October 17, 1791
28	36	John Brown (A-KY)	June 18, 1792
29	37	John Edwards (A-KY)	June 18, 1792
	38	John Taylor of Caroline (A-VA)	October 18, 1792
	39	Richard Potts (F-MD)	January 10, 1793

== See also ==
- 2nd United States Congress
- List of United States representatives in the 2nd Congress
