= F. B. Teter =

American politician (1873–1922)

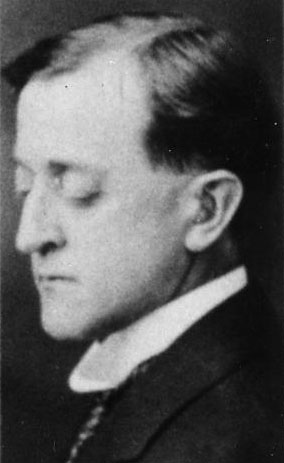
- Teter in 1919

Member of the Washington House of Representatives for the 16th district
- In office 1919–1923

Personal details
- Born: August 9, 1873 Indiana, United States
- Died: June 7, 1922 (aged 48) Davenport, Washington, United States
- Party: Republican

Frederick B. Teter (August 9, 1873 – June 7, 1922) was an American politician in the state of Washington. He served in the Washington House of Representatives from 1919 to 1923. He was a doctor, owned a hospital, and was blind.
