= List of United States senators in the 71st Congress =

This is a complete list of United States senators during the 71st United States Congress listed by seniority from March 4, 1929, to March 3, 1931.

Order of service is based on the commencement of the senator's first term. Behind this is former service as a senator (only giving the senator seniority within their new incoming class), service as vice president, a House member, a cabinet secretary, or a governor of a state. The final factor is the population of the senator's state.

Senators who were sworn in during the middle of the Congress (up until the last senator who was not sworn in early after winning the November 1930 election) are listed at the end of the list with no number.

== Terms of service ==
Class	Terms of service of senators that expired in years
Class 2	Terms of service of senators that expired in 1931 (AL, AR, CO, DE, GA, IA, ID, IL, KS, KY, LA, MA, ME, MI, MN, MS, MT, NC, NE, NH, NJ, NM, OK, OR, RI, SC, SD, TN, TX, VA, WV, and WY.)
Class 3	Terms of service of senators that expired in 1933 (AL, AR, AZ, CA, CO, CT, FL, GA, ID, IL, IN, IA, KS, KY, LA, MD, MO, NC, ND, NH, NV, NY, OH, OK, OR, PA, SC, SD, UT, VT, WA, and WI.)
Class 1	Terms of service of senators that expired in 1935 (AZ, CA, CT, DE, FL, IN, MA, MD, ME, MI, MN, MO, MS, MT, ND, NE, NJ, NM, NV, NY, OH, PA, RI, TN, TX, UT, VA, VT, WA, WI, WV, and WY.)

== U.S. Senate seniority list ==
U.S. Senate seniority
Rank	Senator (party-state)	Seniority date	Other factors
1	Francis E. Warren (R-WY)	March 4, 1895	
2	Furnifold M. Simmons (D-NC)	March 4, 1901	
3	Lee S. Overman (D-NC)	March 4, 1903	North Carolina 15th in population (1900)
4	Reed Smoot (R-UT)	March 4, 1903	Utah 41st in population (1900)
5	William Borah (R-ID)	March 4, 1907	
6	Wesley Jones (R-WA)	March 4, 1909	Former representative
7	Ellison D. Smith (D-SC)	March 4, 1909	South Carolina 24th in population (1900)
8	Duncan U. Fletcher (D-FL)	March 4, 1909	Florida 33rd in population (1900)
9	Claude A. Swanson (D-VA)	August 1, 1910	
10	Henry F. Ashurst (D-AZ)	April 2, 1912	
11	Key Pittman (D-NV)	January 29, 1913	
12	Morris Sheppard (D-TX)	February 3, 1913	
13	Joseph E. Ransdell (D-LA)	March 4, 1913	Former representative (14 years)
14	Joseph Robinson (R-AR)	March 4, 1913	Former representative (10 years), former governor
15	George W. Norris (R-NE)	March 4, 1913	Former representative (10 years)
16	Thomas J. Walsh (D-MT)	March 4, 1913	
17	James Watson (R-IN)	November 8, 1916	
18	Kenneth McKellar (D-TN)	March 4, 1917	Former representative (6 years)
19	William H. King (D-UT)	March 4, 1917	Former representative (3 years)
20	Park Trammell (D-FL)	March 4, 1917	Former governor, Florida 33rd in population (1910)
21	John B. Kendrick (D-WY)	March 4, 1917	Former governor, Wyoming 47th in population (1910)
22	Frederick Hale (R-ME)	March 4, 1917	
23	Hiram Johnson (R-CA)	March 16, 1917	
24	George H. Moses (R-NH)	November 6, 1918	
25	Charles L. McNary (R-OR)	December 18, 1918	
26	Arthur Capper (R-KS)	March 4, 1919	Former governor, Kansas 22nd in population (1910)
27	Henry W. Keyes (R-NH)	March 4, 1919	Former governor, New Hampshire 39th in population (1910)
28	William J. Harris (D-GA)	March 4, 1919	Georgia 10th in population (1910)
29	Lawrence C. Phipps (R-CO)	March 4, 1919	Colorado 32nd in population (1910)
30	Pat Harrison (D-MS)	March 5, 1919	
31	Walter E. Edge (R-NJ)	May 19, 1919	
32	Carter Glass (D-VA)	February 2, 1920	
33	James Thomas Heflin (D-AL)	November 2, 1920	
34	Thaddeus H. Caraway (D-AR)	March 4, 1921	Former representative
35	Peter Norbeck (R-SD)	March 4, 1921	Former governor, South Dakota 37th in population (1920)
36	Samuel M. Shortridge (R-CA)	March 4, 1921	California 8th in population (1920)
37	Edwin S. Broussard (D-LA)	March 4, 1921	Louisiana 22nd in population (1920)
38	Tasker Oddie (R-NV)	March 4, 1921	Nevada 48th in population (1920)
39	David A. Reed (R-PA)	August 8, 1922	
40	Walter F. George (D-GA)	November 22, 1922	
41	James Couzens (R-MI)	November 29, 1922	
42	Frank L. Greene (R-VT)	March 4, 1923	Former representative (11 years)
43	Simeon Fess (R-OH)	March 4, 1923	Former representative (10 years), Ohio 4th in population (1920)
44	Hubert D. Stephens (D-MS)	March 4, 1923	Former representative (10 years), Mississippi 23rd in population (1920)
45	Clarence Dill (D-WA)	March 4, 1923	Former representative (4 years)
46	Lynn Frazier (R-ND)	March 4, 1923	Former governor
47	Royal S. Copeland (D-NY)	March 4, 1923	New York 1st in population (1920)
48	Henrik Shipstead (FL-MN)	March 4, 1923	Minnesota 17th in population (1920)
49	Robert B. Howell (R-NE)	March 4, 1923	Nebraska 31st in population (1920)
50	Burton K. Wheeler (D-MT)	March 4, 1923	Montana 39th in population (1920)
51	Porter H. Dale (R-VT)	November 7, 1923	
52	Jesse H. Metcalf (R-RI)	November 4, 1924	
53	Hiram Bingham (R-CT)	December 17, 1924	
54	Charles S. Deneen (R-IL)	February 26, 1925	
55	Frederick H. Gillett (R-MA)	March 4, 1925	Former representative (32 years)
56	Thomas D. Schall (R-MN)	March 4, 1925	Former representative (10 years)
57	Coleman L. Blease (R-SC)	March 4, 1925	Former governor, South Carolina 26th in population (1920)
58	William McMaster (R-SD)	March 4, 1925	Former governor, South Dakota 37th in population (1920)
59	Frederic Sackett (R-KY)	March 4, 1925	Kentucky 15th in population (1920)
60	Lawrence Tyson (R-TN)	March 4, 1925	Tennessee 19th in population (1920)
61	William B. Pine (R-OK)	March 4, 1925	Oklahoma 21st in population (1920)
62	Guy D. Goff (R-WV)	March 4, 1925	West Virginia 27th in population (1920)
63	Sam G. Bratton (D-NM)	March 4, 1925	New Mexico`43rd in population (1920)
64	Robert M. La Follette, Jr. (R-WI)	September 30, 1925	
65	Arthur Robinson (R-IN)	October 20, 1925	
66	Gerald Nye (R-ND)	November 14, 1925	
67	Daniel F. Steck (D-IA)	April 12, 1926	
68	Arthur R. Gould (R-ME)	November 30, 1926	
69	David I. Walsh (D-MA)	December 6, 1926	Previously a senator
70	Harry B. Hawes (D-MO)	December 6, 1926	
71	Smith W. Brookhart (R-IA)	March 4, 1927	Previously a senator
72	William S. Vare (R-PA)	March 4, 1927	Former representative (15 years), Pennsylvania 2nd in population (1920)
73	Carl Hayden (D-AZ)	March 4, 1927	Former representative (15 years), Arizona 45th in population (1920)
74	Alben W. Barkley (D-KY)	March 4, 1927	Former representative (14 years)
75	Elmer Thomas (D-OK)	March 4, 1927	Former representative (4 years), Oklahoma 21st in population (1920)
76	Millard Tydings (D-MD)	March 4, 1927	Former representative (4 years), Maryland 28th in population (1920)
77	John J. Blaine (R-WI)	March 4, 1927	Former governor
78	Robert F. Wagner (D-NY)	March 4, 1927	New York 1st in population (1920)
79	Hugo Black (D-AL)	March 4, 1927	Alabama 18th in population (1920)
80	Charles Waterman (R-CO)	March 4, 1927	Colorado 33rd in population (1920)
81	Frederick Steiwer (R-OR)	March 4, 1927	Oregon 34th in population (1920)
82	Arthur H. Vandenberg (R-MI)	March 31, 1928	
83	John Thomas (R-ID)	June 30, 1928	
84	Otis F. Glenn (R-IL)	November 7, 1928	
85	Daniel Hastings (R-DE)	December 10, 1928	
86	Theodore E. Burton (R-OH)	December 15, 1928	
87	Bronson Cutting (R-NM)	March 4, 1929	Previously a senator
88	Tom Connally (D-TX)	March 4, 1929	Former representative (12 years)
89	Roscoe C. Patterson (R-MO)	March 4, 1929	Former representative (2 years)
90	Henry D. Hatfield (R-WV)	March 4, 1929	Former governor, West Virginia 27th in population (1920)
91	Phillips Lee Goldsborough (R-MD)	March 4, 1929	Former governor, Maryland 28th in population (1920)
92	John G. Townsend, Jr. (R-DE)	March 4, 1929	Former governor, Delaware 46th in population (1920)
93	Hamilton Kean (R-NJ)	March 4, 1929	New Jersey 10th in population (1920)
94	Frederic Walcott (R-CT)	March 4, 1929	Connecticut 29th in population (1920)
95	Felix Hebert (R-RI)	March 4, 1929	Rhode Island 38th in population (1920)
96	Henry J. Allen (R-KS)	April 1, 1929	
	William Brock (D-TN)	September 2, 1929	
	Roscoe C. McCulloch (R-OH)	November 5, 1929	
	David Baird, Jr. (R-NJ)	November 30, 1929	
	Patrick J. Sullivan (R-WY)	December 5, 1929	
	Joseph R. Grundy (R-PA)	December 11, 1929	
	John M. Robsion (R-KY)	January 11, 1930	
	Robert J. Bulkley (D-OH)	December 1, 1930	Former representative
	Robert D. Carey (R-WY)	December 1, 1930	Former governor
	Ben M. Williamson (D-KY)	December 1, 1930	Kentucky 15th in population (1920)
	George McGill (D-KS)	December 1, 1930	Kansas 24th in population (1920)
	James J. Davis (R-PA)	December 2, 1930	
	Dwight Morrow (R-NJ)	December 3, 1930	
	Cameron A. Morrison (D-NC)	December 13, 1930	
	Frank C. Partridge (R-VT)	December 23, 1930	

== See also ==
- 72nd United States Congress
- List of United States representatives in the 72nd Congress
