= Teeter =

Teeter or Teater is a surname. Notable people with the surname include:

- Archie Boyd Teater (1901–1978), American painter
- Earl Teater (1905/06-1972), American horse trainer
- Elizabeth Teeter, American actress
- Josh Teater (born 1969), American golfer
- Karl V. Teeter (1929–2007), American linguist
- Lara Teeter (born 1955), American dancer, actor, singer, theatre director and college professor
- Lawrence Teeter (1948–2005), American lawyer and attorney of Sirhan Sirhan
- Mike Teeter (born 1967), American football defensive lineman
- Robert Teeter (1939–2004), American Republican pollster and political campaign strategist

== See also ==
- Teeter Plan, a law in California
- Harris Teeter, a supermarket chain
- Teter (disambiguation)
