= List of United States senators in the 14th Congress =

This is a complete list of United States senators during the 14th United States Congress listed by seniority from March 4, 1815, to March 3, 1817.

Order of service is based on the commencement of the senator's first term. Behind this is former service as a senator (only giving the senator seniority within their new incoming class), service as vice president, a House member, a cabinet secretary, or a governor of a state. The final factor is the population of the senator's state.

The two main parties at this point were the Federalists (F), and Democratic Republicans (DR). At the end of this congress, there was one person elected who was an Anti-Democrat (AD).

== Terms of service ==
Class	Terms of service of senators that expired in years
Class 2	Terms of service of senators that expired in 1817 (DE, GA, KY, LA, MA, NC, NH, NJ, RI, SC, TN, and VA.)
Class 3	Terms of service of senators that expired in 1819 (CT, DE, IN, MD, NH, NJ, NY, OH, PA, RI, SC, and VT.)
Class 1	Terms of service of senators that expired in 1821 (CT, GA, IN, KY, LA, MA, MD, NC, NY, OH, PA, TN, VA, and VT.)

== U.S. Senate seniority list ==
U.S. Senate seniority
Rank	Senator (party-state)	Seniority date	Other factors
1	John Gaillard (DR-SC)	December 6, 1804	
2	James Turner (DR-NC)	March 4, 1805	
3	John Condit (DR-NJ)	March 21, 1809	
4	Charles Tait (DR-GA)	November 27, 1809	
5	Outerbridge Horsey (F-DE)	January 12, 1810	
6	Samuel Whittlesey Dana (F-CT)	December 4, 1810	
7	John Taylor (DR-SC)	December 31, 1810	
8	Jeremiah Brown Howell (DR-RI)	March 4, 1811	
9	Joseph Bradley Varnum (DR-MA)	June 29, 1811	
10	William Hunter (F-RI)	October 28, 1811	
11	James Brown (DR-LA)	February 5, 1813	
12	Rufus King (F-NY)	March 4, 1813	Former senator
13	Jeremiah Morrow (DR-OH)	March 4, 1813	Former representative (10 years)
14	Abner Lacock (DR-PA)	March 4, 1813	Former representative (2 years)
15	Dudley Chase (DR-VT)	March 4, 1813	Vermont 14th in population (1810)
16	Eligius Fromentin (DR-LA)	March 4, 1813	Louisiana 17th in population (1810)
17	Christopher Gore (F-MA)	May 5, 1813	
18	David Daggett (F-CT)	May 13, 1813	
19	Robert Henry Goldsborough (F-MD)	May 21, 1813	
20	William Hill Wells (F-DE)	May 28, 1813	
21	Jeremiah Mason (F-NH)	June 10, 1813	
22	William Wyatt Bibb (DR-GA)	November 6, 1813	
23	Jonathan Roberts (DR-PA)	February 24, 1814	
24	Jesse Wharton (DR-TN)	March 17, 1814	
25	Thomas Weston Thompson (F-NH)	June 24, 1814	
26	William Taylor Barry (DR-KY)	December 16, 1814	
27	Francis Locke, Jr. (DR-NC)	Did not qualify	
28	James Barbour (DR-VA)	January 2, 1815	
29	Isham Talbot (DR-KY)	February 2, 1815	
30	Isaac Tichenor (F-VT)	March 4, 1815	Former senator
31	Nathan Sanford (DR-NY)	March 4, 1815	New York 1st in population (1810)
32	James Jefferson Wilson (DR-NJ)	March 4, 1815	New Jersey 12th in population (1810)
33	Benjamin Ruggles (DR-OH)	March 4, 1815	Ohio 13th in population (1810)
34	George Washington Campbell (DR-TN)	October 10, 1815	Former senator
35	John Williams (DR-TN)	October 10, 1815	
36	Nathaniel Macon (DR-NC)	December 5, 1815	
37	Robert Goodlow Harper (F-MD)	January 29, 1816	
38	Armistead Thomson Mason (DR-VA)	January 3, 1816	
39	Eli Porter Ashmun (F-MA)	June 12, 1816	
40	George Michael Troup (DR-GA)	November 13, 1816	Former representative
41	Martin D. Hardin (F-SC)	November 13, 1816	
42	Montfort Stokes (DR-NC)	December 4, 1816	North Carolina 4th in population (1810)
43	William Smith (DR-SC)	December 4, 1816	South Carolina 6th in population (1810)
44	James Noble (DR-IN)	December 11, 1816	Alphabetical (N)
45	Waller Taylor (DR-IN)	December 11, 1816	Alphabetical (T)
46	Alexander Contee Hanson (F-MD)	December 20, 1816	

== See also ==
- 14th United States Congress
- List of United States representatives in the 13th Congress
