= List of United States representatives in the 81st Congress =

This is a complete list of United States representatives during the 81st United States Congress listed by seniority.

As an historical article, the districts and party affiliations listed reflect those during the 81st Congress (January 3, 1949 – January 3, 1951). Seats and party affiliations on similar lists for other congresses will be different for certain members.

Seniority depends on the date on which members were sworn into office. Since many members are sworn in on the same day, subsequent ranking is based on previous congressional service of the individual and then by alphabetical order by the last name of the representative.

Committee chairmanship in the House is often associated with seniority. However, party leadership is typically not associated with seniority.

Note: The "*" indicates that the representative/delegate may have served one or more non-consecutive terms while in the House of Representatives of the United States Congress.

== U.S. House seniority list ==
U.S. House seniority
Rank	Representative	Party	District	Seniority date (Previous service, if any)	No.# of term(s)	Notes
1	Adolph J. Sabath	D	IL-07	March 4, 1907	22nd term	Dean of the House
2	Robert L. Doughton	D	NC-09	March 4, 1911	20th term	
3	Sam Rayburn	D	TX-04	March 4, 1913	19th term	Speaker of the House
4	Carl Vinson	D	GA-06	November 3, 1914	19th term	
5	S. Otis Bland	D	VA-01	July 2, 1918	17th term	Died on February 16, 1950.
6	Daniel A. Reed	R	NY-45	March 4, 1919	16th term	
7	John E. Rankin	D	MS-01	March 4, 1921	15th term	
8	Roy O. Woodruff	R	MI-10	March 4, 1921; Previous service, 1913–1915.	16th term*	
9	Sol Bloom	D	NY-20	March 4, 1923	14th term	Died on March 7, 1949.
10	Clarence Cannon	D	MO-09	March 4, 1923	14th term	
11	Emanuel Celler	D	NY-15	March 4, 1923	14th term	
12	Robert Crosser	D	OH-21	March 4, 1923; Previous service, 1913–1919.	17th term*	
13	John Taber	R	NY-38	March 4, 1923	14th term	
14	John H. Kerr	D	NC-02	November 6, 1923	14th term	
15	E. Eugene Cox	D	GA-02	March 4, 1925	13th term	
16	Charles Aubrey Eaton	R	NJ-05	March 4, 1925	13th term	
17	Thomas A. Jenkins	R	OH-10	March 4, 1925	13th term	
18	Joseph William Martin Jr.	R	MA-14	March 4, 1925	13th term	
19	Mary Teresa Norton	D	NJ-13	March 4, 1925	13th term	Left the House in 1951.
20	Andrew Lawrence Somers	D	NY-10	March 4, 1925	13th term	Died on April 6, 1949.
21	William Madison Whittington	D	MS-03	March 4, 1925	13th term	Left the House in 1951.
22	Edith Nourse Rogers	R	MA-05	June 30, 1925	13th term	
23	Richard J. Welch	R	CA-05	August 31, 1926	13th term	Died on September 10, 1949.
24	Clifford R. Hope	R	KS-05	March 4, 1927	12th term	
25	Charles A. Wolverton	R	NJ-01	March 4, 1927	12th term	
26	John William McCormack	D	MA-12	November 6, 1928	12th term	
27	Richard B. Wigglesworth	R	MA-13	November 6, 1928	12th term	
28	Jere Cooper	D	TN-09	March 4, 1929	11th term	
29	Wright Patman	D	TX-01	March 4, 1929	11th term	
30	Alfred L. Bulwinkle	D	NC-11	March 4, 1931; Previous service, 1921–1929.	14th term*	Died on August 31, 1950.
31	Howard W. Smith	D	VA-08	March 4, 1931	10th term	
32	Brent Spence	D	KY-05	March 4, 1931	10th term	
33	Jesse P. Wolcott	R	MI-07	March 4, 1931	10th term	
34	Leo E. Allen	R	IL-16	March 4, 1933	9th term	
35	William M. Colmer	D	MS-06	March 4, 1933	9th term	
36	John D. Dingell Sr.	D	MI-15	March 4, 1933	9th term	
37	George Anthony Dondero	R	MI-17	March 4, 1933	9th term	
38	John Kee	D	WV-05	March 4, 1933	9th term	
39	John Lesinski Sr.	D	MI-16	March 4, 1933	9th term	Died on May 27, 1950.
40	J. Hardin Peterson	D	FL-01	March 4, 1933	9th term	Left the House in 1951.
41	James P. Richards	D	SC-05	March 4, 1933	9th term	
42	James Wolcott Wadsworth Jr.	R	NY-41	March 4, 1933	9th term	Left the House in 1951.
43	Francis E. Walter	D	PA-20	March 4, 1933	9th term	
44	Paul Brown	D	GA-10	July 5, 1933	9th term	
45	Charles Albert Plumley	R	VT	January 16, 1934	9th term	Left the House in 1951.
46	Harold D. Cooley	D	NC-04	July 7, 1934	9th term	
47	August H. Andresen	R	MN-01	January 3, 1935; Previous service, 1925–1933.	12th term*	
48	Leslie C. Arends	R	IL-17	January 3, 1935	8th term	
49	Graham A. Barden	D	NC-03	January 3, 1935	8th term	
50	Charles A. Buckley	D	NY-25	January 3, 1935	8th term	
51	W. Sterling Cole	R	NY-39	January 3, 1935	8th term	
52	Fred L. Crawford	R	MI-08	January 3, 1935	8th term	
53	Albert J. Engel	D	MI-09	January 3, 1935	8th term	Left the House in 1951.
54	Edward J. Hart	D	NJ-14	January 3, 1935	8th term	
55	Sam Hobbs	D	AL-04	January 3, 1935	8th term	Left the House in 1951.
56	Clare Hoffman	R	MI-04	January 3, 1935	8th term	
57	Merlin Hull	R	WI-09	January 3, 1935; Previous service, 1929–1931.	9th term*	
58	George H. Mahon	D	TX-19	January 3, 1935	8th term	
59	Earl C. Michener	R	MI-02	January 3, 1935; Previous service, 1919–1933.	15th term*	Left the House in 1951.
60	Joseph L. Pfeifer	D	NY-08	January 3, 1935	8th term	Left the House in 1951.
61	Chauncey W. Reed	R	IL-14	January 3, 1935	8th term	
62	Dewey Jackson Short	R	MO-07	January 3, 1935; Previous service, 1929–1931.	9th term*	
63	Karl Stefan	R	NE-03	January 3, 1935	8th term	
64	Charles A. Halleck	R	IN-02	January 29, 1935	8th term	
65	Frank W. Boykin	D	AL-01	July 30, 1935	8th term	
66	A. Leonard Allen	D	LA-08	January 3, 1937	7th term	
67	George J. Bates	R	MA-06	January 3, 1937	7th term	Died on November 1, 1949.
68	Overton Brooks	D	LA-04	January 3, 1937	7th term	
69	William T. Byrne	D	NY-32	January 3, 1937	7th term	
70	Francis Case	R	SD-02	January 3, 1937	7th term	Left the House in 1951.
71	Herman P. Eberharter	D	PA-32	January 3, 1937	7th term	
72	Noble Jones Gregory	D	KY-01	January 3, 1937	7th term	
73	Eugene James Keogh	D	NY-09	January 3, 1937	7th term	
74	Michael J. Kirwan	D	OH-19	January 3, 1937	7th term	
75	Noah M. Mason	R	IL-15	January 3, 1937	7th term	
76	John R. Murdock	D	AZ-01	January 3, 1937	7th term	
77	Donald Lawrence O'Toole	D	NY-13	January 3, 1937	7th term	
78	Stephen Pace	D	GA-03	January 3, 1937	7th term	Left the House in 1951.
79	William R. Poage	D	TX-11	January 3, 1937	7th term	
80	Edward Herbert Rees	R	KS-04	January 3, 1937	7th term	
81	Paul W. Shafer	R	MI-03	January 3, 1937	7th term	
82	Harry R. Sheppard	D	CA-21	January 3, 1937	7th term	
83	Albert Thomas	D	TX-08	January 3, 1937	7th term	
84	J. Parnell Thomas	R	NJ-07	January 3, 1937	7th term	Resigned on January 2, 1950.
85	Richard M. Simpson	R	PA-17	May 11, 1937	7th term	
86	Ralph A. Gamble	R	NY-28	November 2, 1937	7th term	
87	Joe B. Bates	D	KY-08	June 4, 1938	7th term	
88	George M. Grant	D	AL-02	June 14, 1938	7th term	
89	Herman Carl Andersen	R	MN-07	January 3, 1939	6th term	
90	Jack Z. Anderson	R	CA-08	January 3, 1939	6th term	
91	Homer D. Angell	R	OR-03	January 3, 1939	6th term	
92	Lindley Beckworth	D	TX-03	January 3, 1939	6th term	
93	William W. Blackney	R	MI-06	January 3, 1939; Previous service, 1935–1937.	7th term*	
94	Clarence J. Brown	R	OH-07	January 3, 1939	6th term	
95	Joseph R. Bryson	D	SC-04	January 3, 1939	6th term	
96	Robert B. Chiperfield	R	IL-19	January 3, 1939	6th term	
97	Cliff Clevenger	R	OH-05	January 3, 1939	6th term	
98	Carl Curtis	R	NE-01	January 3, 1939	6th term	
99	Carl T. Durham	D	NC-06	January 3, 1939	6th term	
100	Charles H. Elston	R	OH-01	January 3, 1939	6th term	
101	Ivor D. Fenton	R	PA-12	January 3, 1939	6th term	
102	Ezekiel C. Gathings	D	AR-01	January 3, 1939	6th term	
103	Ed Gossett	D	TX-13	January 3, 1939	6th term	
104	Louis E. Graham	R	PA-25	January 3, 1939	6th term	
105	Leonard W. Hall	R	NY-02	January 3, 1939	6th term	
106	John Carl Hinshaw	R	CA-20	January 3, 1939	6th term	
107	Ben F. Jensen	R	IA-07	January 3, 1939	6th term	
108	Robert Kean	R	NJ-12	January 3, 1939	6th term	
109	Frank Bateman Keefe	R	WI-06	January 3, 1939	6th term	Left the House in 1951.
110	Paul J. Kilday	D	TX-20	January 3, 1939	6th term	
111	John C. Kunkel	R	PA-18	January 3, 1939	6th term	Left the House in 1951.
112	Karl M. LeCompte	R	IA-04	January 3, 1939	6th term	
113	Vito Marcantonio	ALP	NY-18	January 3, 1939; Previous service, 1935–1937.	7th term*	Left the House in 1951.
114	Thomas E. Martin	R	IA-01	January 3, 1939	6th term	
115	John L. McMillan	D	SC-06	January 3, 1939	6th term	
116	Wilbur Mills	D	AR-02	January 3, 1939	6th term	
117	Mike Monroney	D	OK-05	January 3, 1939	6th term	Left the House in 1951.
118	Reid F. Murray	R	WI-07	January 3, 1939	6th term	
119	William F. Norrell	D	AR-06	January 3, 1939	6th term	
120	Frederick Cleveland Smith	R	OH-08	January 3, 1939	6th term	Left the House in 1951.
121	Henry O. Talle	R	IA-02	January 3, 1939	6th term	
122	John Martin Vorys	R	OH-12	January 3, 1939	6th term	
123	Lansdale Ghiselin Sasscer	D	MD-05	February 3, 1939	6th term	
124	Albert Sidney Camp	D	GA-04	August 1, 1939	6th term	
125	Edwin Arthur Hall	R	NY-37	November 7, 1939	6th term	
126	John Jennings	R	TN-02	December 30, 1939	6th term	Left the House in 1951.
127	Clarence E. Kilburn	R	NY-34	February 13, 1940	6th term	
128	Clifford Davis	D	TN-10	February 14, 1940	6th term	
129	Walter A. Lynch	D	NY-23	February 20, 1940	6th term	Left the House in 1951.
130	Frances P. Bolton	R	OH-22	February 27, 1940	6th term	
131	J. Harry McGregor	R	OH-17	February 27, 1940	6th term	
132	Herbert Covington Bonner	D	NC-01	November 5, 1940	6th term	
133	C. W. Bishop	R	IL-26	January 3, 1941	5th term	
134	Gordon Canfield	R	NJ-08	January 3, 1941	5th term	
135	Paul Cunningham	R	IA-05	January 3, 1941	5th term	
136	Frank Fellows	R	ME-03	January 3, 1941	5th term	
137	Aime Forand	D	RI-01	January 3, 1941; Previous service, 1937–1939.	6th term*	
138	Walter K. Granger	D	UT-01	January 3, 1941	5th term	
139	Oren Harris	D	AR-07	January 3, 1941	5th term	
140	Felix Edward Hébert	D	LA-01	January 3, 1941	5th term	
141	James J. Heffernan	D	NY-11	January 3, 1941	5th term	
142	William S. Hill	R	CO-02	January 3, 1941	5th term	
143	Augustine B. Kelley	D	PA-27	January 3, 1941	5th term	
144	Henry M. Jackson	D	WA-02	January 3, 1941	5th term	
145	Joseph O'Hara	R	MN-02	January 3, 1941	5th term	
146	Percy Priest	D	TN-06	January 3, 1941	5th term	
147	L. Mendel Rivers	D	SC-01	January 3, 1941	5th term	
148	Earl Wilson	R	IN-09	January 3, 1941	5th term	
149	Eugene Worley	D	TX-18	January 3, 1941	5th term	Resigned on April 3, 1950.
150	Lawrence H. Smith	R	WI-01	August 29, 1941	5th term	
151	Wilson D. Gillette	R	PA-14	November 4, 1941	5th term	
152	Jamie Whitten	D	MS-02	November 4, 1941	5th term	
153	Thomas J. Lane	D	MA-07	December 30, 1941	5th term	
154	Cecil R. King	D	CA-17	August 25, 1942	5th term	
155	Thomas Abernethy	D	MS-04	January 3, 1943	4th term	
156	James C. Auchincloss	R	NJ-03	January 3, 1943	4th term	
157	Frank A. Barrett	R	WY	January 3, 1943	4th term	Resigned on December 31, 1950.
158	James Glenn Beall	R	MD-06	January 3, 1943	4th term	
159	Walter E. Brehm	R	OH-11	January 3, 1943	4th term	
160	Ralph E. Church	R	IL-13	January 3, 1943; Previous service, 1935–1941.	7th term*	Died on March 21, 1950.
161	William L. Dawson	D	IL-01	January 3, 1943	4th term	
162	Harris Ellsworth	R	OR-04	January 3, 1943	4th term	
163	Michael A. Feighan	D	OH-20	January 3, 1943	4th term	
164	Antonio M. Fernández	D	NM	January 3, 1943	4th term	
165	O. C. Fisher	D	TX-21	January 3, 1943	4th term	
166	Leon H. Gavin	R	PA-19	January 3, 1943	4th term	
167	Angier Goodwin	R	MA-08	January 3, 1943	4th term	
168	Thomas S. Gordon	D	IL-08	January 3, 1943	4th term	
169	Martin Gorski	D	IL-05	January 3, 1943	4th term	Died on December 4, 1949.
170	Harold Hagen	R	MN-09	January 3, 1943	4th term	
171	Robert Hale	R	ME-01	January 3, 1943	4th term	
172	Brooks Hays	D	AR-05	January 3, 1943	4th term	
173	Christian Herter	R	MA-10	January 3, 1943	4th term	
174	Charles B. Hoeven	R	IA-08	January 3, 1943	4th term	
175	Chester E. Holifield	D	CA-19	January 3, 1943	4th term	
176	Hal Holmes	R	WA-04	January 3, 1943	4th term	
177	Walt Horan	R	WA-05	January 3, 1943	4th term	
178	Justin L. Johnson	R	CA-03	January 3, 1943	4th term	
179	Walter Judd	R	MN-05	January 3, 1943	4th term	
180	Henry D. Larcade Jr.	D	LA-07	January 3, 1943	4th term	
181	William Lemke	R	ND	January 3, 1943; Previous service, 1933–1941.	8th term*	Died on May 30, 1950.
182	Jay Le Fevre	R	NY-30	January 3, 1943	4th term	Left the House in 1951.
183	Bernard W. Kearney	R	NY-31	January 3, 1943	4th term	
184	Ray Madden	D	IN-01	January 3, 1943	4th term	
185	Mike Mansfield	D	MT-01	January 3, 1943	4th term	
186	Chester Earl Merrow	R	NH-01	January 3, 1943	4th term	
187	Arthur L. Miller	R	NE-04	January 3, 1943	4th term	
188	James H. Morrison	D	LA-06	January 3, 1943	4th term	
189	Tom J. Murray	D	TN-08	January 3, 1943	4th term	
190	Thomas J. O'Brien	D	IL-06	January 3, 1943; Previous service, 1933–1939.	7th term*	
191	Alvin O'Konski	R	WI-10	January 3, 1943	4th term	
192	Philip J. Philbin	D	MA-03	January 3, 1943	4th term	
193	John J. Phillips	R	CA-22	January 3, 1943	4th term	
194	George G. Sadowski	D	MI-01	January 3, 1943; Previous service, 1933–1939.	7th term*	Left the House in 1951.
195	Sid Simpson	R	IL-20	January 3, 1943	4th term	
196	Lowell Stockman	R	OR-02	January 3, 1943	4th term	
197	Dean P. Taylor	R	NY-33	January 3, 1943	4th term	
198	Harry Lancaster Towe	R	NJ-09	January 3, 1943	4th term	
199	Charles W. Vursell	R	IL-24	January 3, 1943	4th term	
200	Alvin F. Weichel	R	OH-13	January 3, 1943	4th term	
201	W. Arthur Winstead	D	MS-05	January 3, 1943	4th term	
202	Clair Engle	D	CA-02	August 31, 1943	4th term	
203	Errett P. Scrivner	R	KS-02	September 14, 1943	4th term	
204	Samuel K. McConnell Jr.	R	PA-16	January 18, 1944	4th term	
205	George W. Andrews	D	AL-03	March 14, 1944	4th term	
206	William G. Stigler	D	OK-02	March 28, 1944	4th term	
207	John J. Rooney	D	NY-12	June 6, 1944	4th term	
208	Rolla C. McMillen	R	IL-22	June 13, 1944	4th term	Left the House in 1951.
209	John W. Byrnes	R	WI-08	January 3, 1945	3rd term	
210	Clifford P. Case	R	NJ-06	January 3, 1945	3rd term	
211	Frank Chelf	D	KY-04	January 3, 1945	3rd term	
212	Albert M. Cole	R	KS-01	January 3, 1945	3rd term	
213	Jesse M. Combs	D	TX-02	January 3, 1945	3rd term	
214	Robert J. Corbett	R	PA-30	January 3, 1945; Previous service, 1939–1941.	4th term*	
215	James I. Dolliver	R	IA-06	January 3, 1945	3rd term	
216	Helen Gahagan Douglas	D	CA-14	January 3, 1945	3rd term	Left the House in 1951.
217	George Hyde Fallon	D	MD-04	January 3, 1945	3rd term	
218	James G. Fulton	R	PA-31	January 3, 1945	3rd term	
219	Albert A. Gore Sr.	D	TN-04	January 3, 1945; Previous service, 1939–1944.	6th term*	
220	Ralph W. Gwinn	R	NY-27	January 3, 1945	3rd term	
221	T. Millet Hand	R	NJ-02	January 3, 1945	3rd term	
222	Franck R. Havenner	P	CA-04	January 3, 1945; Previous service, 1937–1941.	5th term*	
223	E. H. Hedrick	D	WV-06	January 3, 1945	3rd term	
224	John W. Heselton	R	MA-01	January 3, 1945	3rd term	
225	Walter B. Huber	D	OH-14	January 3, 1945	3rd term	Left the House in 1951.
226	Henry J. Latham	R	NY-03	January 3, 1945	3rd term	
227	John E. Lyle Jr.	D	TX-14	January 3, 1945	3rd term	
228	Gordon L. McDonough	R	CA-15	January 3, 1945	3rd term	
229	George Paul Miller	D	CA-06	January 3, 1945	3rd term	
230	Thomas E. Morgan	D	PA-24	January 3, 1945	3rd term	
231	Tom Pickett	D	TX-07	January 3, 1945	3rd term	
232	Charles Melvin Price	D	IL-25	January 3, 1945	3rd term	
233	Adam Clayton Powell Jr.	D	NY-22	January 3, 1945	3rd term	
234	Albert Rains	D	AL-05	January 3, 1945	3rd term	
235	Robert F. Rich	R	PA-15	January 3, 1945; Previous service, 1930–1943.	10th term*	Left the House in 1951.
236	Dwight L. Rogers	D	FL-06	January 3, 1945	3rd term	
237	Bob Sikes	D	FL-03	January 3, 1945; Previous service, 1941–1944.	5th term*	
238	James William Trimble	D	AR-03	January 3, 1945	3rd term	
239	John Stephens Wood	D	GA-09	January 3, 1945; Previous service, 1931–1935.	5th term*	
240	John E. Fogarty	D	RI-02	February 7, 1945; Previous service, 1941–1944.	5th term*	
241	J. Vaughan Gary	D	VA-03	March 6, 1945	3rd term	
242	Wesley A. D'Ewart	R	MT-02	June 5, 1945	3rd term	
243	A. Walter Norblad	R	OR-01	January 18, 1946	3rd term	
244	Arthur G. Klein	D	NY-19	February 19, 1946; Previous service, 1941–1945.	5th term*	
245	Frank Buchanan	D	PA-33	May 21, 1946	3rd term	
246	Olin E. Teague	D	TX-06	August 24, 1946	3rd term	
247	Burr Harrison	D	VA-07	November 5, 1946	3rd term	
248	Thomas B. Stanley	D	VA-05	November 5, 1946	3rd term	
249	Carl Albert	D	OK-03	January 3, 1947	2nd term	
250	John J. Allen Jr.	R	CA-07	January 3, 1947	2nd term	
251	Laurie C. Battle	D	AL-09	January 3, 1947	2nd term	
252	John B. Bennett	R	MI-12	January 3, 1947; Previous service, 1943–1945.	3rd term*	
253	John Blatnik	D	MN-08	January 3, 1947	2nd term	
254	Hale Boggs	D	LA-02	January 3, 1947; Previous service, 1941–1943.	3rd term*	
255	J. Caleb Boggs	R	DE	January 3, 1947	2nd term	
256	Ernest K. Bramblett	R	CA-11	January 3, 1947	2nd term	
257	Omar Burleson	D	TX-17	January 3, 1947	2nd term	
258	John A. Carroll	D	CO-01	January 3, 1947	2nd term	Left the House in 1951.
259	Norris Cotton	R	NH-02	January 3, 1947	2nd term	
260	Frederic René Coudert Jr.	R	NY-17	January 3, 1947	2nd term	
261	Paul B. Dague	R	PA-09	January 3, 1947	2nd term	
262	James C. Davis	D	GA-05	January 3, 1947	2nd term	
263	Charles B. Deane	D	NC-08	January 3, 1947	2nd term	
264	Harold Donohue	D	MA-04	January 3, 1947	2nd term	
265	Joe L. Evins	D	TN-05	January 3, 1947	2nd term	
266	Katharine St. George	R	NY-29	January 3, 1947	2nd term	
267	Porter Hardy Jr.	D	VA-02	January 3, 1947	2nd term	
268	Donald L. Jackson	R	CA-16	January 3, 1947	2nd term	
269	Jacob K. Javits	R	NY-21	January 3, 1947	2nd term	
270	Edward H. Jenison	R	IL-23	January 3, 1947	2nd term	
271	Hamilton C. Jones	D	NC-10	January 3, 1947	2nd term	
272	Frank M. Karsten	D	MO-13	January 3, 1947	2nd term	
273	Carroll D. Kearns	R	PA-28	January 3, 1947	2nd term	
274	Kenneth Keating	R	NY-40	January 3, 1947	2nd term	
275	John F. Kennedy	D	MA-11	January 3, 1947	2nd term	
276	Henderson Lovelace Lanham	D	GA-07	January 3, 1947	2nd term	
277	John Davis Lodge	R	CT-04	January 3, 1947	2nd term	Left the House in 1951.
278	Wingate H. Lucas	D	TX-12	January 3, 1947	2nd term	
279	W. Kingsland Macy	R	NY-01	January 3, 1947	2nd term	Left the House in 1951.
280	Edward Tylor Miller	R	MD-01	January 3, 1947	2nd term	
281	Herbert Alton Meyer	R	KS-03	January 3, 1947	2nd term	Died on October 2, 1950.
282	Toby Morris	D	OK-06	January 3, 1947	2nd term	
283	Thurston Ballard Morton	R	KY-03	January 3, 1947	2nd term	
284	Richard Nixon	R	CA-12	January 3, 1947	2nd term	Resigned on November 30, 1950.
285	Otto Passman	D	LA-05	January 3, 1947	2nd term	
286	James T. Patterson	R	CT-05	January 3, 1947	2nd term	
287	Dayton E. Phillips	R	TN-01	January 3, 1947	2nd term	Left the House in 1951.
288	Prince Preston	D	GA-01	January 3, 1947	2nd term	
289	Norris Poulson	R	CA-13	January 3, 1947; Previous service, 1943–1945.	3rd term*	
290	Monroe Minor Redden	D	NC-12	January 3, 1947	2nd term	
291	R. Walter Riehlman	R	NY-36	January 3, 1947	2nd term	
292	Antoni Sadlak	R	CT	January 3, 1947	2nd term	
293	John C. Sanborn	R	ID-02	January 3, 1947	2nd term	Left the House in 1951.
294	Hardie Scott	R	PA-03	January 3, 1947	2nd term	
295	Hugh Scott	R	PA-06	January 3, 1947; Previous service, 1941–1945.	4th term*	
296	George Smathers	D	FL-04	January 3, 1947	2nd term	Left the House in 1951.
297	Wint Smith	R	KS-06	January 3, 1947	2nd term	
298	Thor C. Tollefson	R	WA-06	January 3, 1947	2nd term	
299	William M. Wheeler	D	GA-08	January 3, 1947	2nd term	
300	John Bell Williams	D	MS-07	January 3, 1947	2nd term	
301	Joseph Franklin Wilson	D	TX-05	January 3, 1947	2nd term	
302	James E. Van Zandt	R	PA-22	January 3, 1947; Previous service, 1939–1943.	5th term*	
303	Robert E. Jones Jr.	D	AL-08	January 28, 1947	2nd term	
304	Glenn Robert Davis	R	WI-02	April 22, 1947	2nd term	
305	Russell V. Mack	R	WA-03	July 7, 1947	2nd term	
306	Edward Garmatz	D	MD-03	July 15, 1947	2nd term	
307	Kenneth M. Regan	D	TX-16	August 23, 1947	2nd term	
308	Clark W. Thompson	D	TX-09	August 23, 1947; Previous service, 1933–1935.	3rd term*	
309	Charles E. Potter	R	MI-11	August 26, 1947	2nd term	
310	Franklin H. Lichtenwalter	R	PA-08	September 9, 1947	2nd term	Left the House in 1951.
311	Ralph Harvey	R	IN-10	November 4, 1947	2nd term	
312	William Moore McCulloch	R	OH-04	November 4, 1947	2nd term	
313	Abraham J. Multer	D	NY-14	November 4, 1947	2nd term	
314	Donald W. Nicholson	R	MA-09	November 18, 1947	2nd term	
315	Watkins Moorman Abbitt	D	VA-04	February 17, 1948	2nd term	
316	John A. Whitaker	D	KY-02	April 17, 1948	2nd term	
317	Clarence G. Burton	D	VA-06	November 2, 1948	2nd term	
318	Paul C. Jones	D	MO-10	November 2, 1948	2nd term	
319	Lloyd Bentsen	D	TX-15	December 4, 1948	2nd term	
320	Hugh Joseph Addonizio	D	NJ-11	January 3, 1949	1st term	
321	Wayne N. Aspinall	D	CO-04	January 3, 1949	1st term	
322	Cleveland M. Bailey	D	WV-03	January 3, 1949; Previous service, 1945–1947.	2nd term*	
323	Walter S. Baring Jr.	D	NV	January 3, 1949	1st term	
324	William A. Barrett	D	PA-01	January 3, 1949; Previous service, 1945–1947.	2nd term*	
325	Charles Edward Bennett	D	FL-02	January 3, 1949	1st term	
326	Andrew Biemiller	D	WI-05	January 3, 1949; Previous service, 1945–1947.	2nd term*	Left the House in 1951.
327	Richard Walker Bolling	D	MO-05	January 3, 1949	1st term	
328	William P. Bolton	D	MD-02	January 3, 1949	1st term	Left the House in 1951.
329	Reva Beck Bosone	D	UT-02	January 3, 1949	1st term	
330	Edward G. Breen	D	OH-03	January 3, 1949	1st term	
331	James V. Buckley	D	IL-04	January 3, 1949	1st term	Left the House in 1951.
332	Usher L. Burdick	R	ND	January 3, 1949; Previous service, 1935–1945.	6th term*	
333	Thomas H. Burke	D	OH-09	January 3, 1949	1st term	Left the House in 1951.
334	Maurice G. Burnside	D	WV-04	January 3, 1949	1st term	
335	Frank E. Carlyle	D	NC-07	January 3, 1949	1st term	
336	A. S. J. Carnahan	D	MO-08	January 3, 1949; Previous service, 1945–1947.	2nd term*	
337	Anthony Cavalcante	D	PA-23	January 3, 1949	1st term	Left the House in 1951.
338	Richard Thurmond Chatham	D	NC-05	January 3, 1949	1st term	
339	Chester A. Chesney	D	IL-11	January 3, 1949	1st term	Left the House in 1951.
340	George H. Christopher	D	MO-06	January 3, 1949	1st term	Left the House in 1951.
341	Earl Chudoff	D	PA-04	January 3, 1949	1st term	
342	L. Gary Clemente	D	NY-04	January 3, 1949	1st term	
343	Thurman C. Crook	D	IN-03	January 3, 1949	1st term	Left the House in 1951.
344	Robert L. Coffey	D	PA-26	January 3, 1949	1st term	Died on April 20, 1949.
345	Harry J. Davenport	D	PA-29	January 3, 1949	1st term	Left the House in 1951.
346	John C. Davies II	D	NY-35	January 3, 1949	1st term	Left the House in 1951.
347	Edward deGraffenried	D	AL-06	January 3, 1949	1st term	
348	James J. Delaney	D	NY-06	January 3, 1949; Previous service, 1945–1947.	2nd term*	
349	Winfield K. Denton	D	IN-08	January 3, 1949	1st term	
350	Isidore Dollinger	D	NY-24	January 3, 1949	1st term	
351	Clyde Doyle	D	CA-18	January 3, 1949; Previous service, 1945–1947.	2nd term*	
352	Carl Elliott	D	AL-07	January 3, 1949	1st term	
353	Daniel J. Flood	D	PA-11	January 3, 1949; Previous service, 1945–1947.	2nd term*	
354	Gerald Ford	R	MI-05	January 3, 1949	1st term	
355	James B. Frazier Jr.	D	TN-03	January 3, 1949	1st term	
356	Thomas B. Fugate	D	VA-09	January 3, 1949	1st term	
357	Foster Furcolo	D	MA-02	January 3, 1949	1st term	
358	Dixie Gilmer	D	OK-01	January 3, 1949	1st term	Left the House in 1951.
359	James S. Golden	R	KY-09	January 3, 1949	1st term	
360	Chester C. Gorski	D	NY-44	January 3, 1949	1st term	Left the House in 1951.
361	William T. Granahan	D	PA-02	January 3, 1949; Previous service, 1945–1947.	2nd term*	
362	William J. Green Jr.	D	PA-05	January 3, 1949; Previous service, 1945–1947.	2nd term*	
363	H. R. Gross	R	IA-03	January 3, 1949	1st term	
364	Cecil M. Harden	R	IN-06	January 3, 1949	1st term	
365	James Butler Hare	D	SC-03	January 3, 1949	1st term	Left the House in 1951.
366	Wayne Hays	D	OH-18	January 3, 1949	1st term	
367	Syd Herlong	D	FL-05	January 3, 1949	1st term	
368	Richard W. Hoffman	R	IL-10	January 3, 1949	1st term	
369	Charles R. Howell	D	NJ-04	January 3, 1949	1st term	
370	Leonard Irving	D	MO-04	January 3, 1949	1st term	
371	Andrew Jacobs Sr.	D	IN-11	January 3, 1949	1st term	Left the House in 1951.
372	Benjamin F. James	R	PA-07	January 3, 1949	1st term	
373	Edgar A. Jonas	R	IL-12	January 3, 1949	1st term	
374	Raymond W. Karst	D	MO-12	January 3, 1949	1st term	Left the House in 1951.
375	Edward H. Kruse	D	IN-04	January 3, 1949	1st term	Left the House in 1951.
376	James F. Lind	D	PA-21	January 3, 1949	1st term	
377	Neil J. Linehan	D	IL-03	January 3, 1949	1st term	Left the House in 1951.
378	Harold Lovre	R	SD-01	January 3, 1949	1st term	
379	Peter F. Mack Jr.	D	IL-21	January 3, 1949	1st term	
380	Clare Magee	D	MO-01	January 3, 1949	1st term	
381	John H. Marsalis	D	CO-03	January 3, 1949	1st term	Left the House in 1951.
382	Fred Marshall	D	MN-06	January 3, 1949	1st term	
383	Eugene McCarthy	D	MN-04	January 3, 1949	1st term	
384	Christopher C. McGrath	D	NY-26	January 3, 1949	1st term	
385	Clinton D. McKinnon	D	CA-23	January 3, 1949	1st term	
386	John A. McGuire	D	CT-03	January 3, 1949	1st term	
387	John McSweeney	D	OH-16	January 3, 1949; Previous service, 1923–1929 and 1937–1939.	5th term**	Left the House in 1951.
388	John E. Miles	D	NM	January 3, 1949	1st term	Left the House in 1951.
389	Hugh Mitchell	D	WA-01	January 3, 1949	1st term	
390	Morgan M. Moulder	D	MO-02	January 3, 1949	1st term	
391	James J. Murphy	D	NY-16	January 3, 1949	1st term	
392	Charles P. Nelson	R	ME-02	January 3, 1949	1st term	
393	James Ellsworth Noland	D	IN-07	January 3, 1949	1st term	Left the House in 1951.
394	George D. O'Brien	D	MI-13	January 3, 1949; Previous service, 1937–1939 and 1941–1947.	5th term**	
395	Barratt O'Hara	D	IL-02	January 3, 1949	1st term	Left the House in 1951.
396	Harry P. O'Neill	D	PA-10	January 3, 1949	1st term	
397	Eugene D. O'Sullivan	D	NE-02	January 3, 1949	1st term	Left the House in 1951.
398	Harold Patten	D	AZ-02	January 3, 1949	1st term	
399	Carl D. Perkins	D	KY-07	January 3, 1949	1st term	
400	William L. Pfeiffer	R	NY-42	January 3, 1949	1st term	Left the House in 1951.
401	James G. Polk	D	OH-06	January 3, 1949; Previous service, 1931–1941.	6th term*	
402	T. Vincent Quinn	D	NY-05	January 3, 1949	1st term	
403	Louis C. Rabaut	D	MI-14	January 3, 1949; Previous service, 1935–1947.	7th term*	
404	Robert L. Ramsay	D	WV-01	January 3, 1949; Previous service, 1933–1939 and 1941–1943.	5th term**	
405	George M. Rhodes	D	PA-13	January 3, 1949	1st term	
406	Abraham A. Ribicoff	D	CT-01	January 3, 1949	1st term	
407	Peter W. Rodino	D	NJ-10	January 3, 1949	1st term	
408	Hubert B. Scudder	R	CA-01	January 3, 1949	1st term	
409	Robert T. Secrest	D	OH-15	January 3, 1949; Previous service, 1933–1942.	6th term*	
410	Hugo S. Sims Jr.	D	SC-02	January 3, 1949	1st term	Left the House in 1951.
411	Harley Orrin Staggers	D	WV-02	January 3, 1949	1st term	
412	Tom Steed	D	OK-04	January 3, 1949	1st term	
413	John B. Sullivan	D	MO-11	January 3, 1949; Previous service, 1941–1943 and 1945–1947.	3rd term**	
414	James Patrick Sutton	D	TN-07	January 3, 1949	1st term	
415	Boyd Anderson Tackett	D	AR-04	January 3, 1949	1st term	
416	Anthony F. Tauriello	D	NY-43	January 3, 1949	1st term	Left the House in 1951.
417	Homer Thornberry	D	TX-10	January 3, 1949	1st term	
418	Thomas R. Underwood	D	KY-06	January 3, 1949	1st term	
419	Harold H. Velde	R	IL-18	January 3, 1949	1st term	
420	Earl T. Wagner	D	OH-02	January 3, 1949	1st term	Left the House in 1951.
421	John R. Walsh	D	IN-05	January 3, 1949	1st term	Left the House in 1951.
422	Phil J. Welch	D	MO-03	January 3, 1949	1st term	
423	Thomas H. Werdel	R	CA-10	January 3, 1949	1st term	
424	Cecil F. White	D	CA-09	January 3, 1949	1st term	Left the House in 1951.
425	Compton I. White	D	ID-01	January 3, 1949; Previous service, 1933–1947.	8th term*	Left the House in 1951.
426	Victor Wickersham	D	OK-07	January 3, 1949; Previous service, 1941–1947.	4th term*	
427	Roy Wier	D	MN-03	January 3, 1949	1st term	
428	Edwin E. Willis	D	LA-03	January 3, 1949	1st term	
429	George H. Wilson	D	OK-08	January 3, 1949	1st term	Left the House in 1951.
430	Gardner R. Withrow	R	WI-03	January 3, 1949; Previous service, 1931–1939.	5th term*	
431	Chase G. Woodhouse	D	CT-02	January 3, 1949; Previous service, 1945–1947.	2nd term*	Left the House in 1951.
432	Sidney R. Yates	D	IL-09	January 3, 1949	1st term	
433	Stephen M. Young	D	OH	January 3, 1949; Previous service, 1933–1937 and 1941–1943.	4th term**	Left the House in 1951.
434	Clement J. Zablocki	D	WI-04	January 3, 1949	1st term	
	Louis B. Heller	D	NY-07	February 15, 1949	1st term	
	Franklin D. Roosevelt Jr.	D	NY-20	May 17, 1949	1st term	
	John P. Saylor	R	PA-26	September 13, 1949	1st term	
	Edna F. Kelly	D	NY-10	November 8, 1949	1st term	
	John F. Shelley	D	CA-05	November 8, 1949	1st term	
	William B. Widnall	R	NJ-07	February 6, 1950	1st term	
	William H. Bates	R	MA-06	February 14, 1950	1st term	
	Edward J. Robeson Jr.	D	VA-01	May 2, 1950	1st term	
	Ben H. Guill	R	TX-18	May 6, 1950	1st term	Left the House in 1951.
	Myron V. George	R	KS-03	November 7, 1950	1st term	
	Woodrow W. Jones	D	NC-11	November 7, 1950	1st term	

== Delegates ==
Rank	Delegate	Party	District	Seniority date (Previous service, if any)	No.# of term(s)	Notes
1	Joseph Rider Farrington	R	HI	January 3, 1943	4th term	
2	Bob Bartlett	D	AK	January 3, 1945	3rd term	
3	Antonio Fernós-Isern	D	PR	September 11, 1946	3rd term	

== See also ==
- 81st United States Congress
- List of United States congressional districts
- List of United States senators in the 81st Congress
