= William Sproul =

William Sproul may refer to:

- William Cameron Sproul (1870–1928), Governor of Pennsylvania
- William H. Sproul (1867–1932), U.S. Representative from Kansas
