= List of United States senators in the 81st Congress =

This is a complete list of United States senators during the 81st United States Congress listed by seniority from January 3, 1949, to January 3, 1951.

Order of service is based on the commencement of the senator's first term. Behind this is former service as a senator (only giving the senator seniority within their new incoming class), service as vice president, a House member, a cabinet secretary, or a governor of a state. The final factor is the population of the senator's state.

Senators who were sworn in during the middle of the two-year congressional term (up until the last senator who was not sworn in early after winning the November 1950 election) are listed at the end of the list with no number.

== Terms of service ==
Class	Terms of service of senators that expired in years
Class 3	Terms of service of senators that expired in 1951 (AL, AR, AZ, CA, CO, CT, FL, GA, ID, IL, IN, IA, KS, KY, LA, MD, MO, NC, ND, NH, NV, NY, OH, OK, OR, PA, SC, SD, UT, VT, WA, and WI.)
Class 1	Terms of service of senators that expired in 1953 (AZ, CA, CT, DE, FL, IN, MA, MD, ME, MI, MN, MO, MS, MT, ND, NE, NJ, NM, NV, NY, OH, PA, RI, TN, TX, UT, VA, VT, WA, WI, WV, and WY.)
Class 2	Terms of service of senators that expired in 1955 (AL, AR, CO, DE, GA, IA, ID, IL, KS, KY, LA, MA, ME, MI, MN, MS, MT, NC, NE, NH, NJ, NM, OK, OR, RI, SC, SD, TN, TX, VA, WV, and WY.)

== U.S. Senate seniority list ==
U.S. Senate seniority
Rank	Senator (party-state)	Seniority date	Other factors
1	Kenneth McKellar (D-TN)	March 4, 1917	
2	Walter F. George (D-GA)	November 22, 1922	
3	Carl Hayden (D-AZ)	March 4, 1927	Former representative (15 years)
4	Alben W. Barkley (D-KY)	March 4, 1927	Former representative (14 years)
5	Elmer Thomas (D-OK)	March 4, 1927	Former representative (4 years), Oklahoma 21st in population (1920)
6	Millard Tydings (D-MD)	March 4, 1927	Former representative (4 years), Maryland 28th in population (1920)
7	Robert F. Wagner (D-NY)	March 4, 1927	
8	Arthur H. Vandenberg (R-MI)	March 31, 1928	
9	Tom Connally (D-TX)	March 4, 1929	
10	Richard Russell Jr. (D-GA)	January 12, 1933	
11	Harry F. Byrd Sr. (D-VA)	March 4, 1933	Former governor
12	Elbert D. Thomas (D-UT)	March 4, 1933	Utah 40th in population (1930)
13	Pat McCarran (D-NV)	March 4, 1933	Nevada 48th in population (1930)
14	Joseph C. O'Mahoney (D-WY)	January 1, 1934	
15	James Murray (D-MT)	November 7, 1934	
16	Dennis Chavez (D-NM)	May 11, 1935	
17	Claude Pepper (D-FL)	November 4, 1936	
18	Edwin C. Johnson (D-CO)	January 3, 1937	Former governor, Colorado 33rd in population (1930)
19	Theodore F. Green (D-RI)	January 3, 1937	Former governor, Rhode Island 37th in population (1930)
20	Styles Bridges (R-NH)	January 3, 1937	Former governor, New Hampshire 41st in population (1930)
21	Allen J. Ellender (D-LA)	January 3, 1937	
22	Joseph L. Hill (D-AL)	January 11, 1938	
23	Scott W. Lucas (D-IL)	January 3, 1939	Former representative (4 years)
24	Charles W. Tobey (R-NH)	January 3, 1939	Former representative (2 years)
25	Clyde M. Reed (R-KS)	January 3, 1939	Former governor
26	Robert A. Taft (R-OH)	January 3, 1939	Ohio 4th in population (1930)
27	Sheridan Downey (D-CA)	January 3, 1939	California 6th in population (1930)
28	Alexander Wiley (R-WI)	January 3, 1939	Wisconsin 13th in population (1930)
29	John Chandler Gurney (R-SD)	January 3, 1939	South Dakota 36th in population (1930)
30	Ralph Owen Brewster (R-ME)	January 3, 1941	Former governor, Maine 35th in population (1930)
31	William Langer (R-ND)	January 3, 1941	Former governor, North Dakota 38th in population (1930)
32	Harley M. Kilgore (D-WV)	January 3, 1941	West Virginia 27th in population (1930)
33	Hugh A. Butler (R-NE)	January 3, 1941	Nebraska 32nd in population (1930)
34	Ernest McFarland (D-AZ)	January 3, 1941	Arizona 43rd in population (1930)
35	George Aiken (R-VT)	January 10, 1941	
36	Burnet R. Maybank (D-SC)	November 5, 1941	
37	Eugene D. Millikin (R-CO)	December 20, 1941	
38	James Eastland (D-MS)	January 3, 1943	Previously a senator
39	John Little McClellan (D-AR)	January 3, 1943	Former representative
40	Homer S. Ferguson (R-MI)	January 3, 1943	Michigan 7th in population (1940)
41	Kenneth S. Wherry (R-NE)	January 3, 1943	Nebraska 32nd in population (1940)
42	Guy Cordon (R-OR)	March 4, 1944	
43	Howard A. Smith (R-NJ)	December 7, 1944	
44	Warren G. Magnuson (D-WA)	December 14, 1944	
45	Francis J. Myers (D-PA)	January 3, 1945	Former representative (6 years)
46	J. William Fulbright (D-AR)	January 3, 1945	Former representative (2 years)
47	Clyde R. Hoey (D-NC)	January 3, 1945	Former representative (1 year, 2 months)
48	Forrest C. Donnell (R-MO)	January 3, 1945	Former governor, Missouri 10th in population (1940)
49	Bourke B. Hickenlooper (R-IA)	January 3, 1945	Former governor, Iowa 20th in population (1940)
50	Olin D. Johnston (D-SC)	January 3, 1945	Former governor, South Carolina 26th in population (1940)
51	Homer E. Capehart (R-IN)	January 3, 1945	Indiana 12th in population (1940)
52	Brien McMahon (D-CT)	January 3, 1945	Connecticut 31st in population (1940)
53	Wayne Morse (R-OR)	January 3, 1945	Oregon 34th in population (1940)
54	Glen H. Taylor (D-ID)	January 3, 1945	Idaho 42nd in population (1940)
54	Leverett Saltonstall (R-MA)	January 4, 1945	
56	Milton Young (R-ND)	March 12, 1945	
57	William F. Knowland (R-CA)	August 26, 1945	
58	Spessard Holland (D-FL)	September 24, 1946	
59	Ralph Flanders (R-VT)	November 1, 1946	
60	A. Willis Robertson (D-VA)	November 6, 1946	Former representative (13 years, 10 months)
61	John Sparkman (D-AL)	November 6, 1946	Former representative (9 years, 10 months)
62	Harry P. Cain (R-WA)	December 26, 1946	
63	Raymond E. Baldwin (R-CT)	December 27, 1946	
64	Henry Cabot Lodge Jr. (R-MA)	January 3, 1947	Previously a senator (7 years, 1 month)
65	William E. Jenner (R-IN)	January 3, 1947	Previously a senator (2 months)
66	Edward Martin (R-PA)	January 3, 1947	Former governor, Pennsylvania 2nd in population (1940)
67	John W. Bricker (R-OH)	January 3, 1947	Former governor, Ohio 4th in population (1940)
68	Edward John Thye (R-MN)	January 3, 1947	Former governor, Minnesota 18th in population (1940)
69	Herbert O'Conor (D-MD)	January 3, 1947	Former governor, Maryland 28th in population (1940)
70	Irving Ives (R-NY)	January 3, 1947	New York 1st in population (1940)
71	James P. Kem (R-MO)	January 3, 1947	Missouri 10th in population (1940)
72	Joseph McCarthy (R-WI)	January 3, 1947	Wisconsin 13th in population (1940)
73	J. Howard McGrath (D-RI)	January 3, 1947	Rhode Island 36th in population (1940)
74	Zales Ecton (R-MT)	January 3, 1947	Montana 39th in population (1940)
75	Arthur Vivian Watkins (R-UT)	January 3, 1947	Utah 40th in population (1940)
76	John J. Williams (R-DE)	January 3, 1947	Delaware 47th in population (1940)
77	George W. Malone (R-NV)	January 3, 1947	Nevada 48th in population (1940)
78	John C. Stennis (D-MS)	November 17, 1947	
79	Karl Mundt (R-SD)	December 31, 1948	Former representative
80	J. Melville Broughton (D-NC)	December 31, 1948	Former governor
81	Russell B. Long (D-LA)	December 31, 1948	
82	Matthew M. Neely (D-WV)	January 3, 1949	Previously a senator (twice) (total tenure 15 years, 10 months)
83	Guy Mark Gillette (D-IA)	January 3, 1949	Previously a senator (8 years, 2 months)
84	Virgil Chapman (D-KY)	January 3, 1949	Former representative (24 years)
85	Lyndon Johnson (D-TX)	January 3, 1949	Former representative (12 years)
86	Estes Kefauver (D-TN)	January 3, 1949	Former representative (10 years)
87	Margaret Chase Smith (R-ME)	January 3, 1949	Former representative (8 years, 7 months)
88	Clinton Anderson (D-NM)	January 3, 1949	Former representative (4 years)
89	Robert S. Kerr (D-OK)	January 3, 1949	Former governor, Oklahoma 22nd in population (1940)
90	Andrew F. Schoeppel (R-KS)	January 3, 1949	Former governor, Kansas 29th in population (1940)
91	Lester C. Hunt (D-WY)	January 3, 1949	Former governor, Wyoming 46th in population (1940)
92	Paul Douglas (D-IL)	January 3, 1949	Illinois 3rd in population (1940)
93	Robert C. Hendrickson (R-NJ)	January 3, 1949	New Jersey 9th in population (1940)
94	Hubert Humphrey (D-MN)	January 3, 1949	Minnesota 18th in population (1940)
95	Bert H. Miller (D-ID)	January 3, 1949	Idaho 42nd in population (1940)
96	Joseph Frear Jr. (D-DE)	January 3, 1949	Delaware 47th in population (1940)
—	Garrett L. Withers (D-KY)	January 20, 1949	
—	Frank Porter Graham (D-NC)	March 29, 1949	
—	John Foster Dulles (R-NY)	July 8, 1949	
—	Edward L. Leahy (D-RI)	August 24, 1949	
—	Henry Dworshak (R-ID)	October 14, 1949	
—	Herbert H. Lehman (D-NY)	November 9, 1949	
—	Harry Darby (R-KS)	December 2, 1949	
—	William Benton (D-CT)	December 17, 1949	
—	Frank Carlson (R-KS)	November 27, 1950	Former representative (12 years)
—	Earle C. Clements (D-KY)	November 27, 1950	Former representative (3 years)
—	Willis Smith (D-NC)	November 27, 1950	
—	Richard Nixon (R-CA)	December 1, 1950	
—	John O. Pastore (D-RI)	December 19, 1950	

The most senior senators by class were Kenneth McKellar (D-Tennessee) from Class 1, Richard Russell Jr. (D-Georgia) from Class 2, and Walter F. George (D-Georgia) from Class 3. Russell was the most senior senator from his class being the junior senator from his state.

== See also ==
- 81st United States Congress
- List of United States representatives in the 81st Congress
