= Thomas D. Winter =

American politician

Thomas Daniel Winter
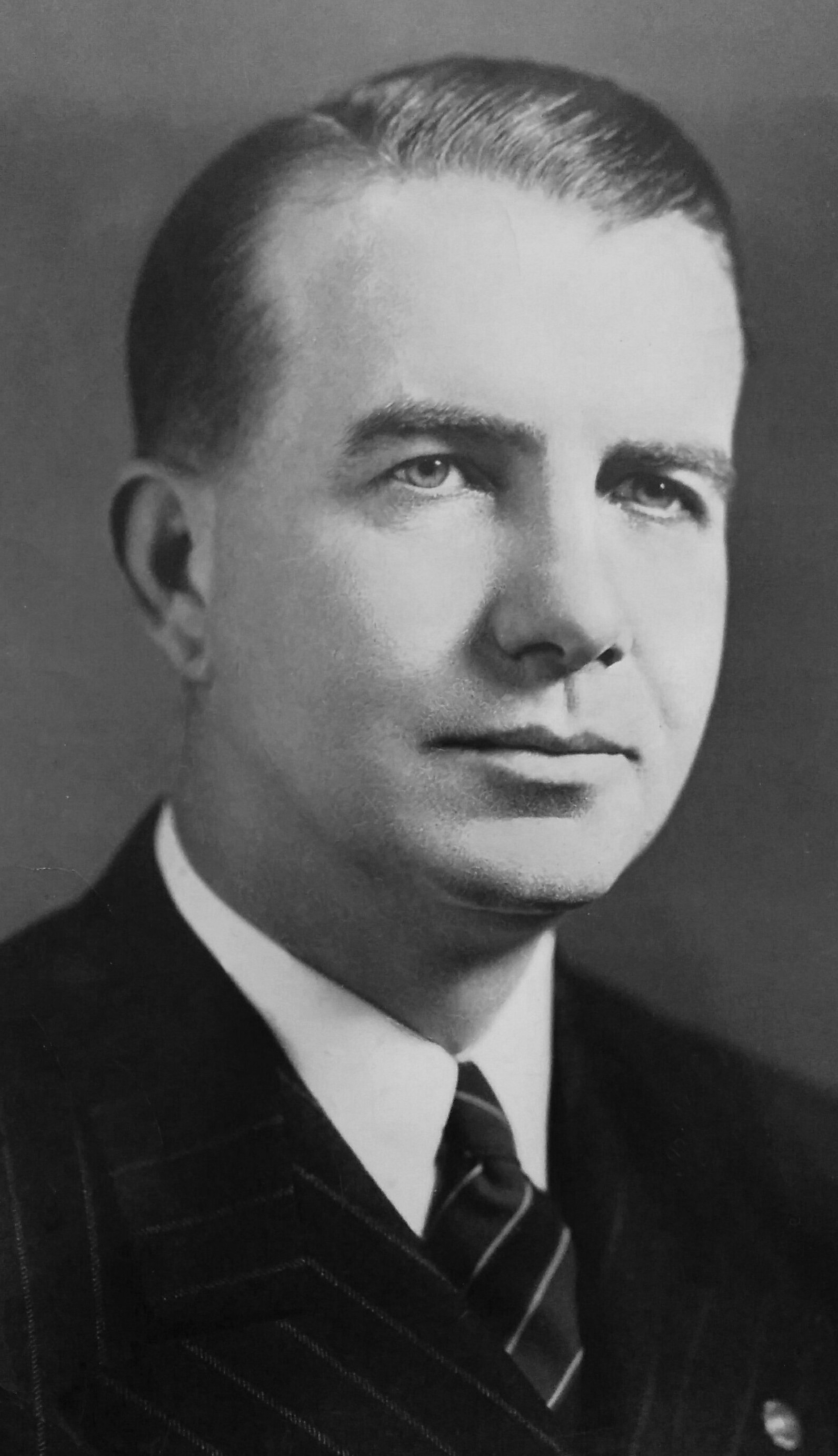

Member of the U.S. House of Representatives from Kansas's 3rd district
- In office January 3, 1939 – January 3, 1947
- Preceded by: Edward White Patterson
- Succeeded by: Herbert Alton Meyer

Personal details
- Born: July 7, 1896 Columbus, Kansas
- Died: November 7, 1951 (aged 55) Pittsburg, Kansas
- Party: Republican

Thomas Daniel Winter (July 7, 1896 – November 7, 1951) was a U.S. representative from Kansas.

Born in Columbus, Kansas, Winter attended the public and high schools. During the First World War served as a private in the United States Army Air Service in 1918 and 1919. Court reporter of the district court of Crawford County, Kansas from 1921 to 1927. He studied law and was admitted to the bar in 1926 and commenced practice in Girard, Kansas.

He served as assistant county attorney of Crawford County, Kansas, in 1927 and 1928 and county attorney in 1929 and 1930. He served as commissioner of public utilities of Girard 1933–1935. He served as commissioner of finance of Girard 1936–1938.

Winter was elected as a Republican to the Seventy-sixth and to the three succeeding Congresses (January 3, 1939 – January 3, 1947). He was an unsuccessful candidate for renomination in 1946. He returned to Girard, Kansas, and continued to practice law. He died in Pittsburg, Kansas, November 7, 1951 and is interred in Park Cemetery, Columbus, Kansas.

U.S. House of Representatives
Preceded by Edward W. Patterson	Member of the U.S. House of Representatives from Kansas's 3rd congressional district January 3, 1939 – January 3, 1947	Succeeded by Herbert A. Meyer
