= Harold C. McGugin =

American politician

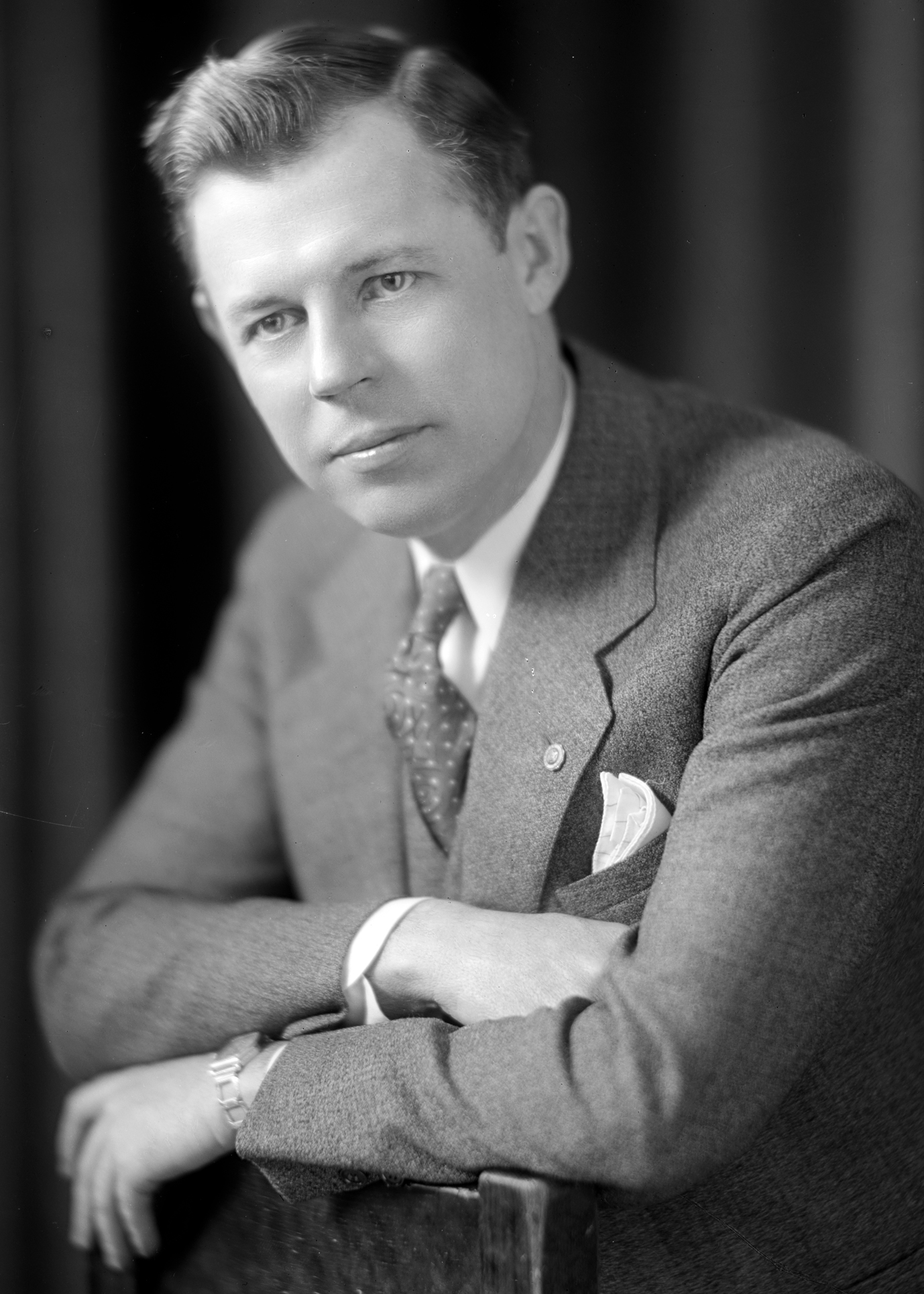

Member of the U.S. House of Representatives from Kansas's 3rd district
- In office March 4, 1931 – January 3, 1935
- Preceded by: William H. Sproul
- Succeeded by: Edward White Patterson

Personal details
- Born: Harold Clement McGugin; November 22, 1893 Liberty, Kansas
- Died: March 7, 1946 (aged 52) Hot Springs, Arkansas
- Resting place: Restlawn Cemetery, Coffeyville, Kansas
- Party: Republican

Harold Clement McGugin (November 22, 1893 – March 7, 1946) was an American lawyer, a veteran of World War I and World War II, and politician who served two terms as a U.S. representative from Kansas from 1931 to 1935.

== Biography ==
Born on a farm near Liberty, Kansas, McGugin attended the public schools of Liberty, Kansas. He moved to Coffeyville, Kansas, in 1908. He was graduated from the high school at Coffeyville in 1912, and from the law department of Washburn College, Topeka, Kansas, in 1915, and took a postgraduate course at the Inns of Court, London, England, in 1919.

He was admitted to the bar in 1915 and commenced practice in Coffeyville, Kansas.

=== World War I ===
During the First World War served as a second lieutenant, Adjutant General's Department, at Brest, France.

=== Early political career ===
He served as member of the Kansas House of Representatives from 1927 to 1929. He was the city attorney of Coffeyville in 1929.

=== Congress ===
McGugin was elected as a Republican to the Seventy-second and Seventy-third Congresses (March 4, 1931 – January 3, 1935). He was an unsuccessful candidate for reelection in 1934 to the Seventy-fourth Congress and for election in 1936 to the Seventy-fifth Congress.

=== Later career and death ===
He resumed the practice of law. In 1938 he ran unsuccessfully for Governor of Kansas, losing in the primary to Payne Ratner. He enlisted in the United States Army in 1942, advancing from captain to lieutenant colonel, and served in France, where he contracted an incurable disease.

He died in the Army and Navy General Hospital at Hot Springs, Arkansas, March 7, 1946. He was interred in Restlawn Cemetery, Coffeyville, Kansas.

U.S. House of Representatives
Preceded by William H. Sproul	Member of the U.S. House of Representatives from Kansas's 3rd congressional district March 4, 1931 – January 3, 1935	Succeeded by Edward W. Patterson
