= Vardy Community School =

- Vardy School Community Historic District
- U.S. National Register of Historic Places
- U.S. Historic district
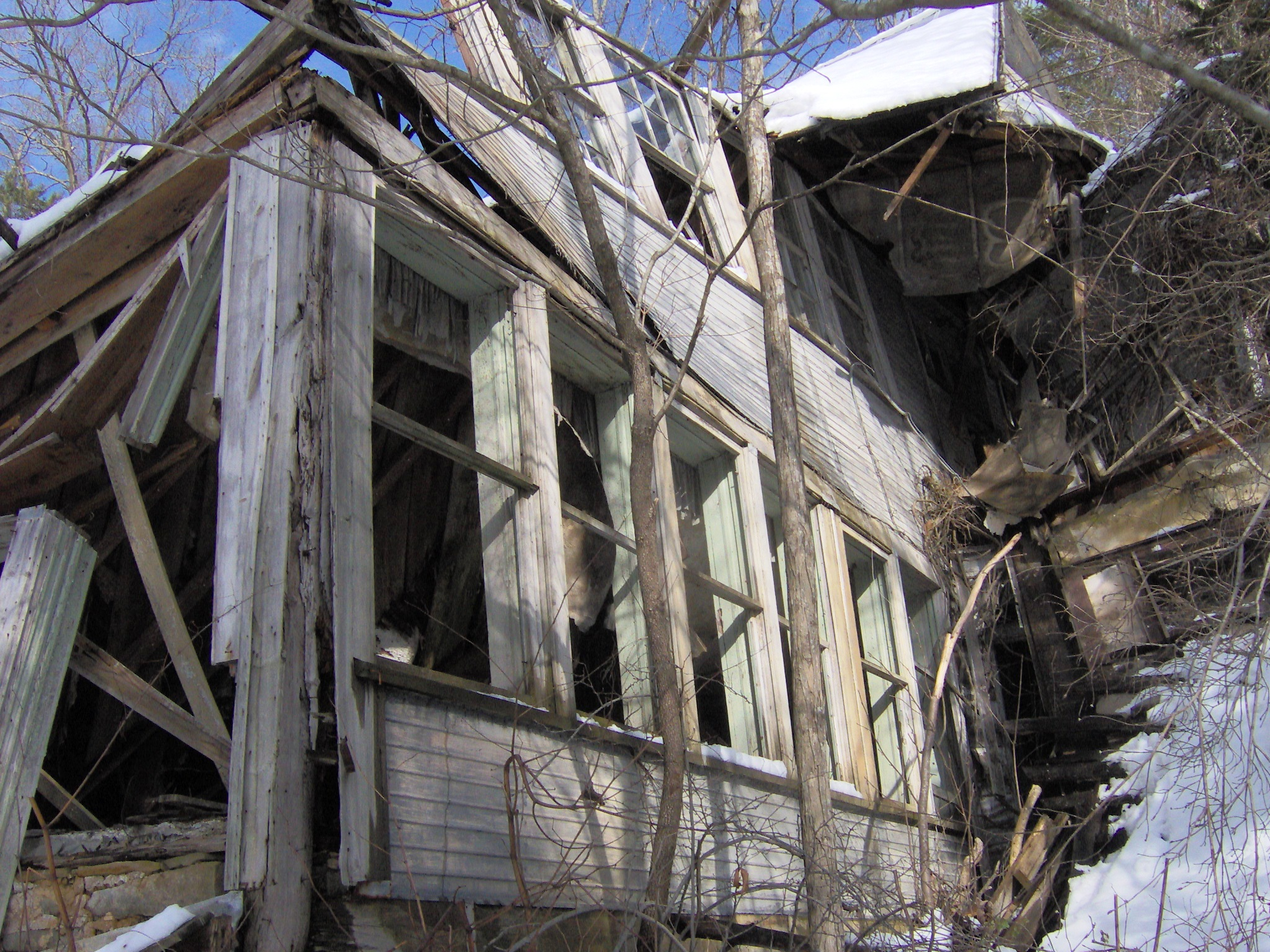
- Ruins of the Vardy Community School

- Location within Tennessee Location within the United States
- Location: Blackwater Rd. in Vardy, Tennessee
- Nearest city: Sneedville, Tennessee
- Coordinates: 36°35′3″N 83°11′19″W
- Area: appx. 7 acres (2.8 ha)
- Built: 1899–1937
- Architect: William H. Leonard, Morgan Osborne, Miles Watson, and others
- Architectural style: Vernacular, Bungalow (influence), Gothic (influence)
- NRHP reference No.: 84000373
- Added to NRHP: November 8, 1984

The Vardy Community School was a Presbyterian mission school established in the Vardy community of Hancock County, Tennessee, United States, in the late-19th and early-20th centuries. At the time of its founding, the school was the only institution providing primary education to children of the multi-racial Melungeon communities, who lived in the remote mountainous areas along the Tennessee-Virginia border.

Part of a segregated system, it was restricted to children considered black or multiracial. Presbyterian missionaries operated the school until 1955; following the United States Supreme Court decision in Brown v. Board of Education (1954) ruling that segregated schools were unconstitutional, it became part of the Hancock County public school system. In 1984, the school and the structures associated with the mission community that developed around it were designated as a historic district and listed on the National Register of Historic Places as the Vardy Community School Historic District.

During the late 19th and early 20th centuries, dozens of settlement schools and mission schools were established across rural Appalachia. In 1892 the Presbyterian Church decided to build such a school at Vardy, a community located near the heart of Melungeon country in the Blackwater Creek Valley. Over the next forty-five years, the mission school complex expanded to include a three-story frame schoolhouse, a church, a manse, a library, and several residences for teachers and children. Although the schoolhouse has collapsed, the school's alumni and other historical groups have preserved its ruins and related structures as a historic site. In 2000, the 19th-century log cabin belonging to Melungeon moonshiner Mahala Mullins was relocated to a site across the street from the Vardy School district.

== Location ==
The Vardy community, sometimes called "Vardy Valley," is situated in a narrow valley carved by Blackwater Creek between Newman's Ridge on the south and Powell Mountain on the north. The valley, part of the Clinch River watershed, stretches for roughly 10 miles (16 km) from Mulberry Gap southwest of Vardy to the Blackwater community in Lee County, Virginia to the northeast. Vardy is still relatively isolated, its primary access being from Sneedville via State Highway 63, which crosses Newman's Ridge through a series of steep switchbacks before intersecting Vardy Blackwater Road near Mulberry Gap. The Vardy School Community is located along Vardy Blackwater Road about 5 miles (8.0 km) east of the road's junction with TN-63.

== History ==
In the early 19th century, the early Melungeon settler Vardeman "Vardy" Collins (1764–?) received a grant for a large plot of land in the Newman's Ridge area. It included the land on which the Vardy school and church are now located. In subsequent decades, his descendants developed his namesake community along Blackwater Creek. In 1834, the Tennessee Constitutional Convention restricted the rights of free people of color, including Melungeons, depriving them of the right to vote, which they had had since the state was established in 1796. They were also forbidden attending public schools, of which there were few in rural areas. This disfranchisement was similar to restrictions passed in Virginia and other southern states following Nat Turner's Rebellion in 1831. Such racial discrimination contributed to the Melungeons of Newman's Ridge maintaining a closed, endogamous community.

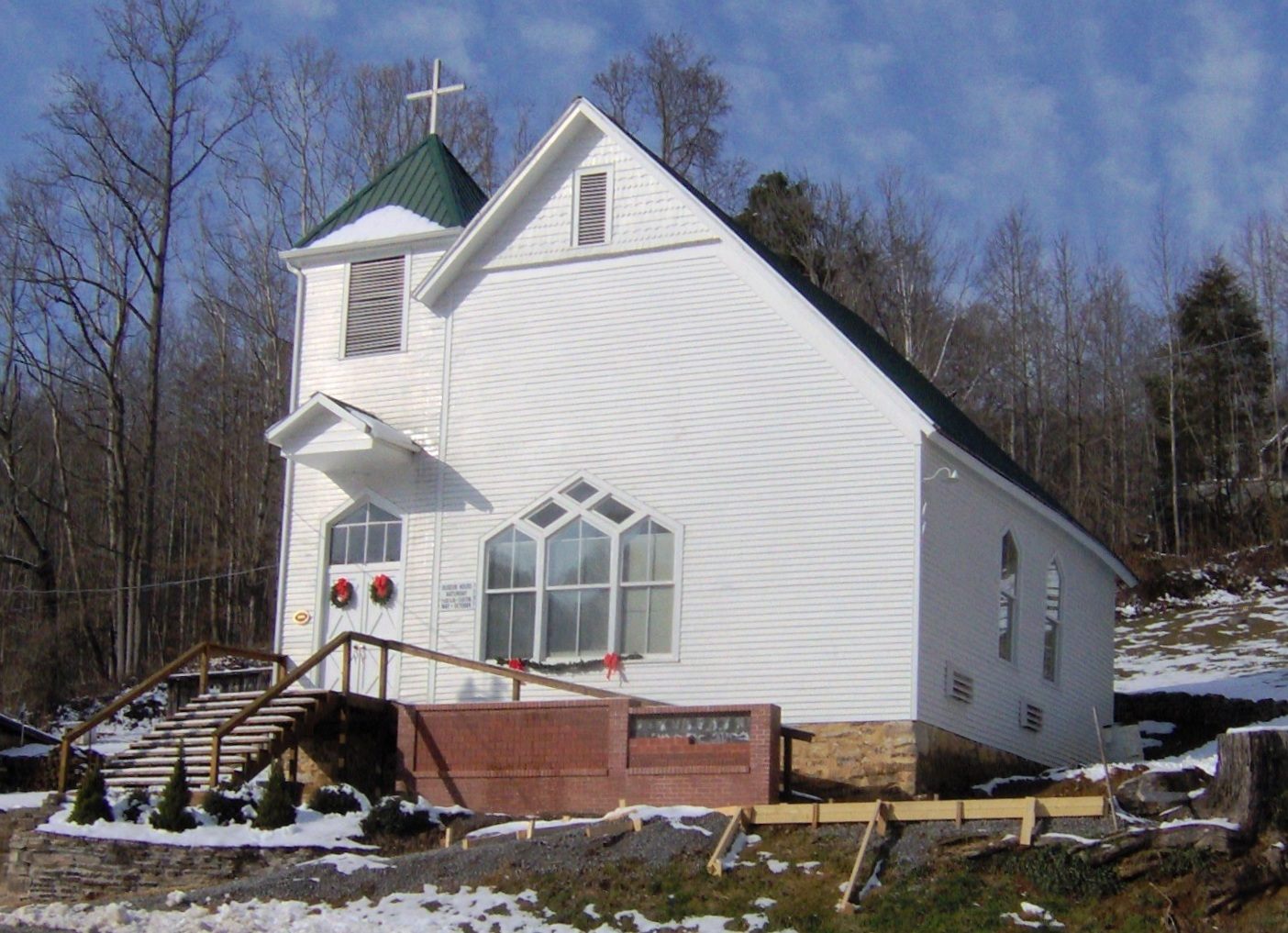
Vardy Presbyterian Church, completed in 1899

Presbyterians were active in Vardy by the late 19th century, when itinerant Presbyterian ministers Christopher Humble and H. P. Cory were conducting sporadic services in the Blackwater Valley. In 1892, the Presbyterian Church's Holston Presbytery decided to establish a mission school at Vardy, and the Presbyterian Women's Board of Missions appointed Annie Miller and Maggie Axtell as missionaries to the community. Batey Collins (a grandson of Vardeman) and his wife Cynthia donated several acres of land for the mission school and church, and other locals donated lumber and helped with construction. The Vardy Mission School, which initially held classes in a crude log structure (no longer standing), was the first to offer the state-mandated 1st-grade through 8th-grade curriculum to children living in the valley. The Vardy Presbyterian Church was completed in 1899, and a new frame schoolhouse was completed in 1902.

In 1910, Mary Rankin, a Scottish missionary and Columbia graduate, arrived in Vardy. For more than three decades, she served as a teacher and nurse. Rankin taught prenatal and postnatal childcare to local mothers and fought malnutrition in the valley. Between 1920 and 1952, the Vardy mission thrived under the leadership of Chester F. Leonard and his wife, Josephine. A new three-story schoolhouse, powered by a Delco generator, was completed in 1929. Upon completion of the new schoolhouse, the Vardy Mission School became known as the Vardy Community School. A series of interim ministers succeeded Leonard.

Following the United States Supreme Court decision in Brown v. Board of Education (1954), ruling that segregated schools were unconstitutional, the Presbyterian Church sold the Vardy school to Hancock County in 1955 and it became part of the public school system. Classes continued at the school until 1973, and services continued at the Vardy Presbyterian Church until 1980.

By 1984, when the Vardy school, church, and ancillary structures were added to the National Register of Historic Places, Vardy had just eight residents. With a $10,000 grant from the Tennessee Humanities Council, the Vardy Community Historical Society began restoring the Vardy Community School's surviving structures. In 2000, the group restored the Mahala Mullins Cabin and moved it from atop Newman's Ridge to Vardy Blackwater Road, opposite the church.

== Historic structures ==
=== Vardy School Community Historic District ===
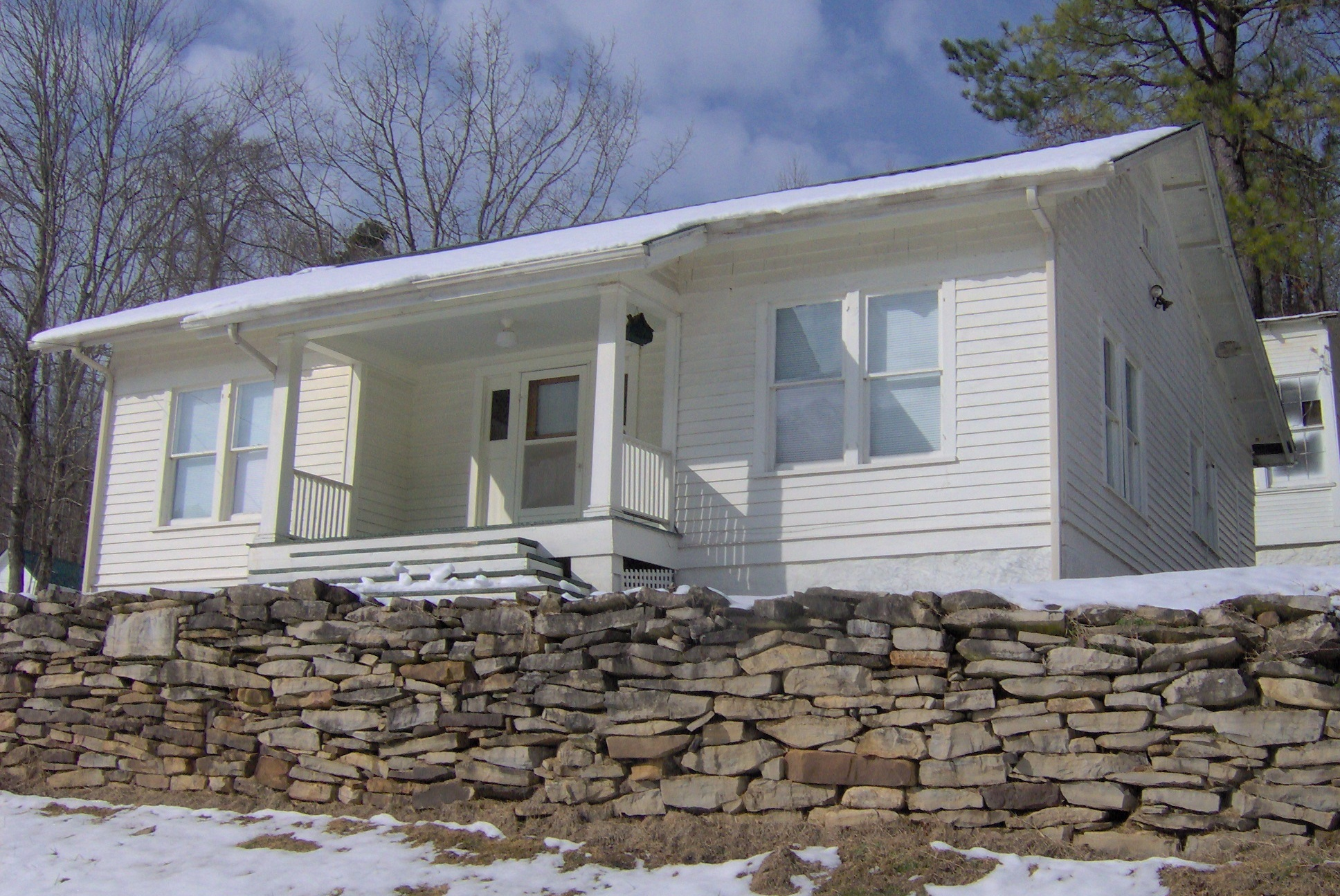
Chester F. Leonard Manse, built in 1921

The Vardy School Community Historic District consists of eight contributing structures and several ancillary structures. The structures all have vernacular designs, although the school and some residences have bungalow influences, and the church's bell tower has Gothic influences. Contributing structures include:

- Vardy Community School, a three-story structure built in 1929 and designed by William H. Leonard (father of Chester F. Leonard). The building originally consisted of a frame structure with a gambrel cross-gable roof and corrugated metal siding. The building's 96 windows allowed ample sunlight to enter during cooler months and allowed cross-breezes to cool classrooms during the warmer months. The building collapsed in October 2003, and only the first-story south wall and part of the first-story floor remain intact. The school has five ancillary structures: a frame garage, a limestone storehouse, a limestone bath house, a limestone water storage tank, and a frame teacher's cottage.
- Vardy Presbyterian Church, a one-story structure built in 1899 by Morgan Osborne and Miles Watson of nearby Blackwater, Virginia. The church has white frame walls, a pitched tin roof, and a two-story side-gabled roof bell tower. The entrance to the church is via double-leaf door at the base of the bell tower. The church has pointed arch windows on its sides and a tripartite pointed-arch tracery window on its front facade. Heavy swinging double-doors divide the vestibule and sanctuary.

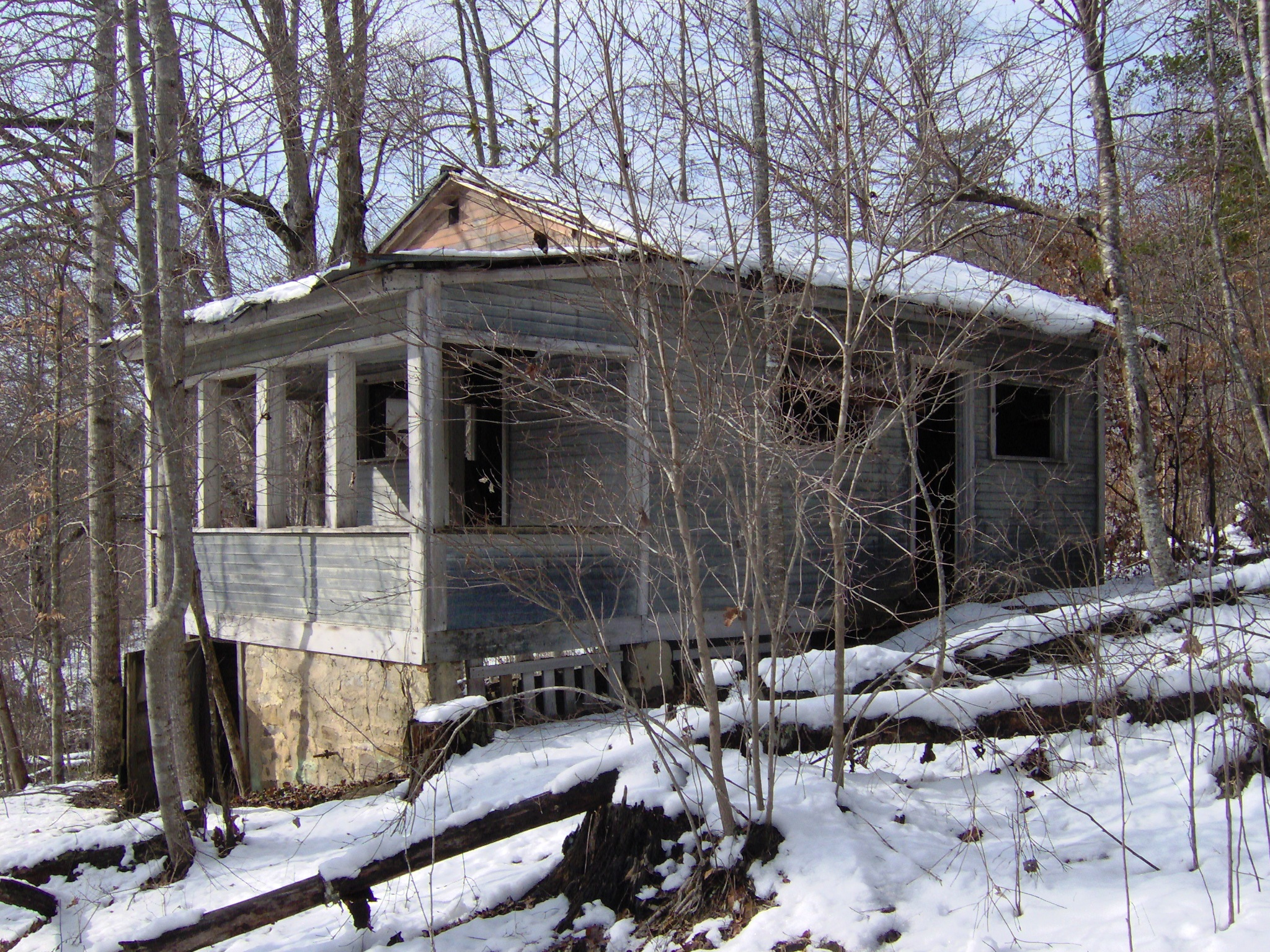
Teacher's cottage, next to the Vardy Community School

- The Chester F. Leonard Manse, a one-story frame structure built in 1921. This building is a prefabricated structure ordered from an Iowa company, and consists of weatherboard siding and a side-gable roof.
- The Clinic, a one-story structure consisting of two rooms with an exterior door for each room on the west side, built over a rock cellar circa 1923. Located behind the manse, it has corrugated metal siding with four windows spanning the front wall and two windows on the back side.
- The general store, a one-story frame structure built in 1937.
- The second Vardy Mission School, a 1 1/2-story frame structure built in 1902. This building has clapboard siding, a pitched gable roof, and a covered porch. The building replaced a crude log structure that had served as the mission's "first" schoolhouse for nearly a decade. After the completion of the Vardy Community School in 1929, this structure was converted into a residence.
- A 1 1/2-story house built in 1920. The house is a frame structure with side-gabled roof and a covered front porch.
- A one-story house built in 1934. The house is a frame structure with a gable roof and covered porch. The house has two contributing ancillary structures— a two-door limestone-wall garage and a small frame storage shed.

=== Mahala Mullins Cabin ===
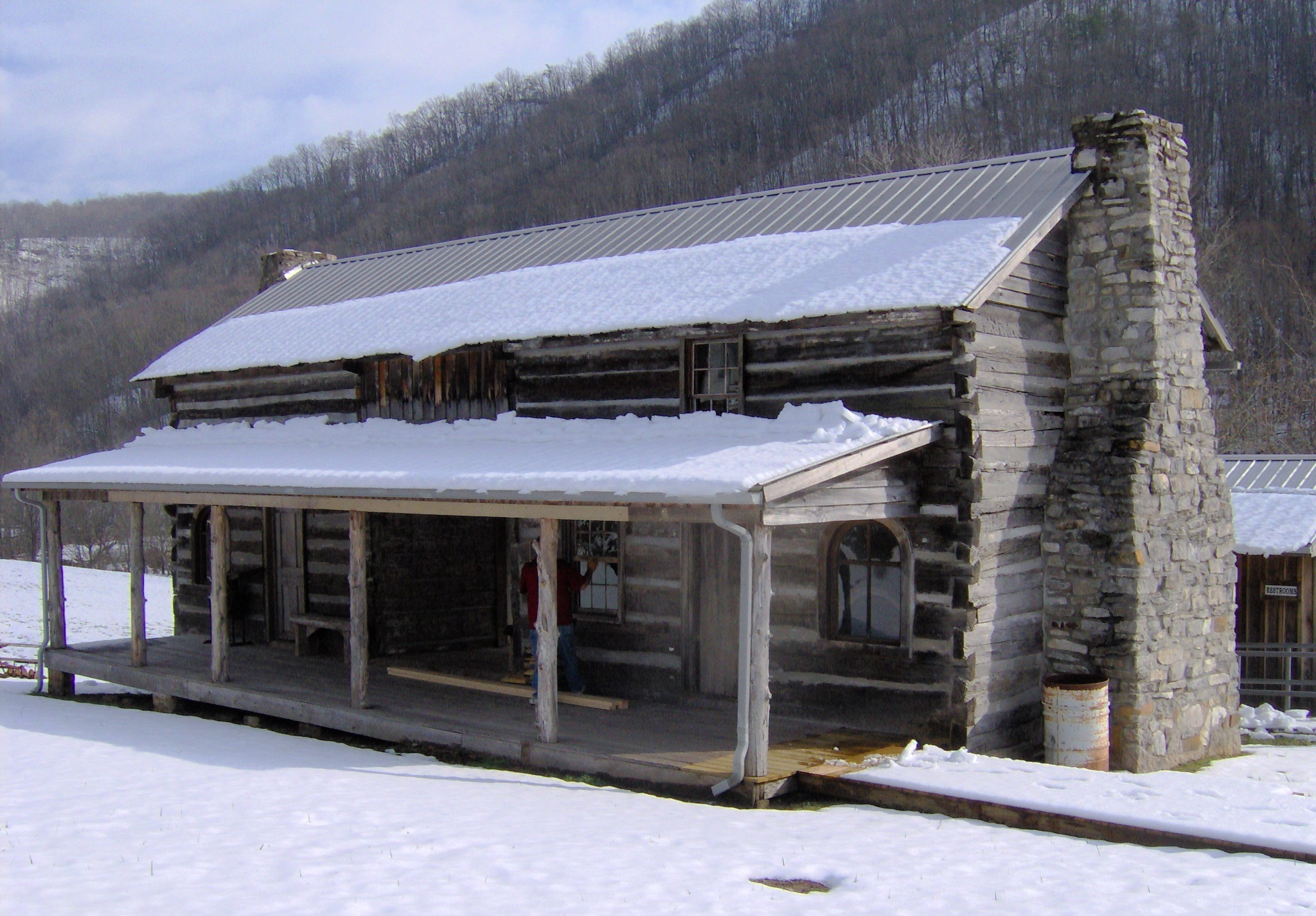
Mahala Mullins Cabin

The Mahala Mullins Cabin was the residence of Mahala Mullins (1824–1898), a legendary Melungeon moonshiner. Afflicted with elephantiasis, Mullins was extremely heavy, which led to local exaggerations about her size. Revenue agents were aware of Mullins' moonshining activities, and often destroyed her stills, but due to her size, they were unable to arrest her.

The cabin is a two-story "dogtrot" cabin constructed of hewn poplar logs with dovetail notching. Massive chimneys of native stone were built at both ends of the cabin. The dogtrot was filled in to make extra room in the 1920s, but has been restored to its original state. The cabin was originally located on the slopes of Newman's Ridge on the property of Dan and Chris Williams. The Williamses donated the cabin to the Vardy Community Historical Society, and the cabin was relocated and restored in 2000.

== See also ==
- Alpine Institute
