= Edward White Patterson =

American politician

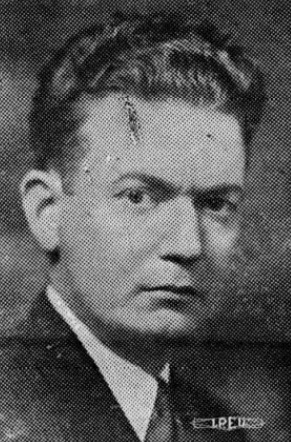
- The Frontenac Press (Frontenac, Kansas), November 6, 1936

Member of the U.S. House of Representatives from Kansas's 3rd district
- In office January 3, 1935 – January 3, 1939
- Preceded by: Harold C. McGugin
- Succeeded by: Thomas Daniel Winter

Personal details
- Born: October 4, 1895 Pittsburg, Kansas
- Died: March 6, 1940 (aged 44) Weir, Kansas
- Party: Democratic

Edward White Patterson (October 4, 1895 – March 6, 1940) was a U.S. representative from Kansas from 1935 to 1939.

== Background ==
Born in Pittsburg, Kansas, Patterson attended local public schools. During the First World War, he served as a sergeant in the 35th Division, American Expeditionary Forces, from May 1917 to March 1919.

After the war, he attended the University of Chicago at Chicago, Illinois. He graduated from the law department of the University of Kansas at Lawrence in 1922, and was admitted to the bar the same year, commencing practice in Pittsburg, Kansas. He served as prosecuting attorney of Crawford County, Kansas from 1926 to 1928.

== Congress ==
Patterson was elected as a Democrat to the Seventy-fourth and Seventy-fifth Congresses (January 3, 1935 – January 3, 1939). He was an unsuccessful candidate for reelection in 1938 to the Seventy-sixth Congress. He resumed the practice of law in Pittsburg, Kansas, until his death in Weir, Kansas on March 6, 1940. He was buried in Highland Park Cemetery, Pittsburg, Kansas.

U.S. House of Representatives
Preceded by Harold C. McGugin	Member of the U.S. House of Representatives from Kansas's 3rd congressional district January 3, 1935 – January 3, 1939	Succeeded by Thomas Daniel Winter
