= William H. Sproul =

American politician

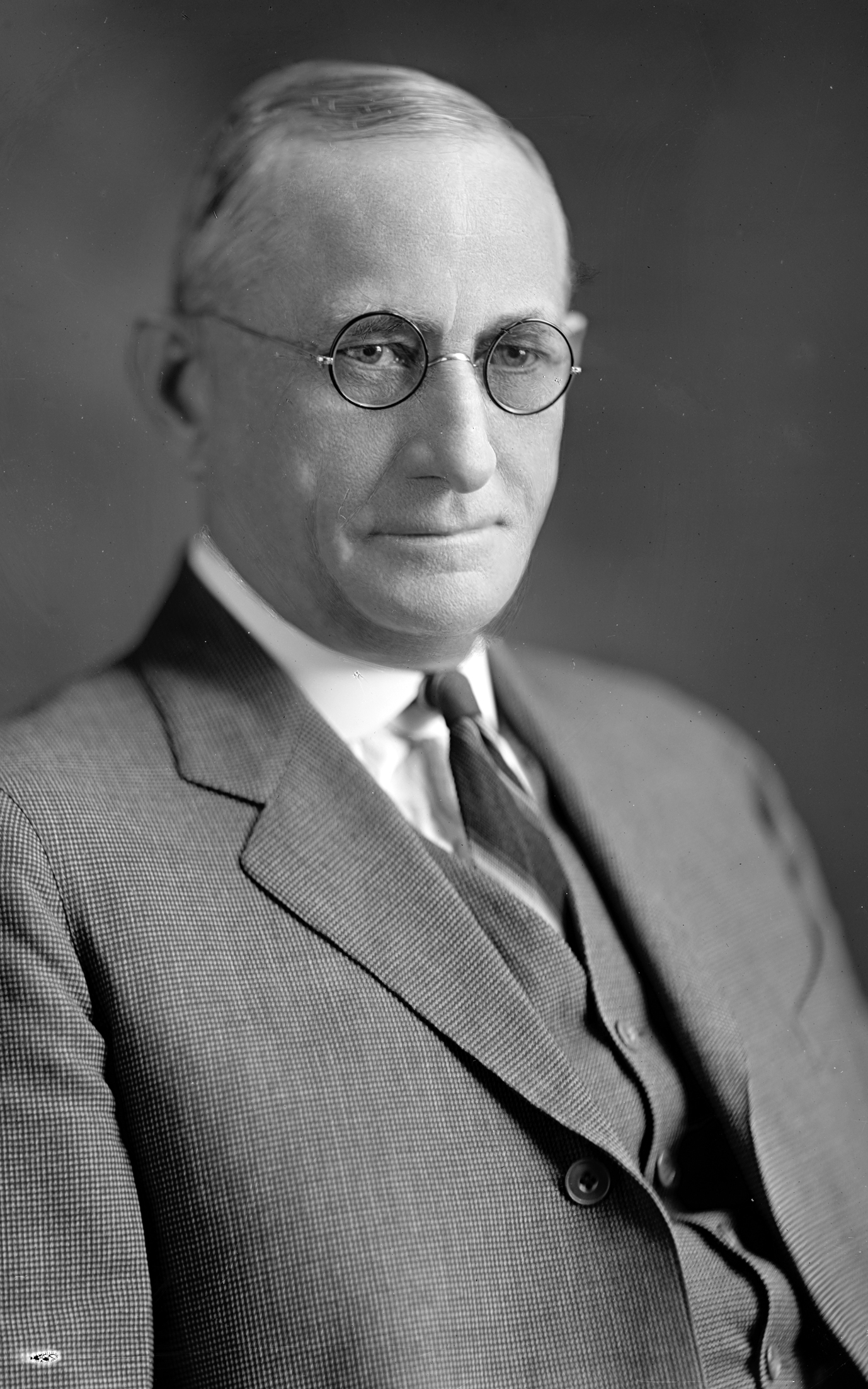

Member of the U.S. House of Representatives from Kansas's 3rd district
- In office March 4, 1923 – March 3, 1931
- Preceded by: Philip P. Campbell
- Succeeded by: Harold C. McGugin

Personal details
- Born: William Henry Sproul; October 14, 1867 Livingston, Tennessee
- Died: December 27, 1932 (aged 65) Kansas City, Missouri
- Resting place: Greenwood Cemetery, Sedan, Kansas
- Party: Republican

William Henry Sproul (October 14, 1867 – December 27, 1932) was an American businessman, lawyer, and politician who served four terms as a U.S. representative from Kansas from 1923 to 1931,

== Biography ==
Born on a farm near Livingston, Tennessee, Sproul attended the public schools and Alpine Academy in Overton County, Tennessee. In 1883 moved to Kansas with his parents, who settled in Cherokee County. He worked on a farm and in the mines. He attended high school at Columbus, Kansas, and the Kansas Normal College at Fort Scott. He taught school at Columbus 1888–1892. He was graduated from the Kansas State University Law School in 1894.

=== Early career ===
He was admitted to the bar in 1894 and commenced practice in Sedan, Kansas.

He served as prosecuting attorney of Chautauqua County 1897–1901. He served as mayor of Sedan from 1921 to 1923. He engaged in agricultural pursuits and stock raising. He was also interested in the oil and gas business.

=== Congress ===
Sproul was elected as a Republican to the Sixty-eighth and to the three succeeding Congresses (March 4, 1923 – March 3, 1931). He served as chairman of the Committee on Mines and Mining (Seventy-first Congress). He was not a candidate for renomination, but was an unsuccessful candidate for nomination for United States Senator in 1930.

=== Later career and death ===
He resumed his former business pursuits. He died in a hospital in Kansas City, Missouri, December 27, 1932. He was interred in Greenwood Cemetery, Sedan, Kansas.

U.S. House of Representatives
Preceded by Philip P. Campbell	Member of the U.S. House of Representatives from Kansas's 3rd congressional district March 4, 1923 – March 3, 1931	Succeeded by Harold C. McGugin
