= Alpine, Tennessee =

- Unincorporated community
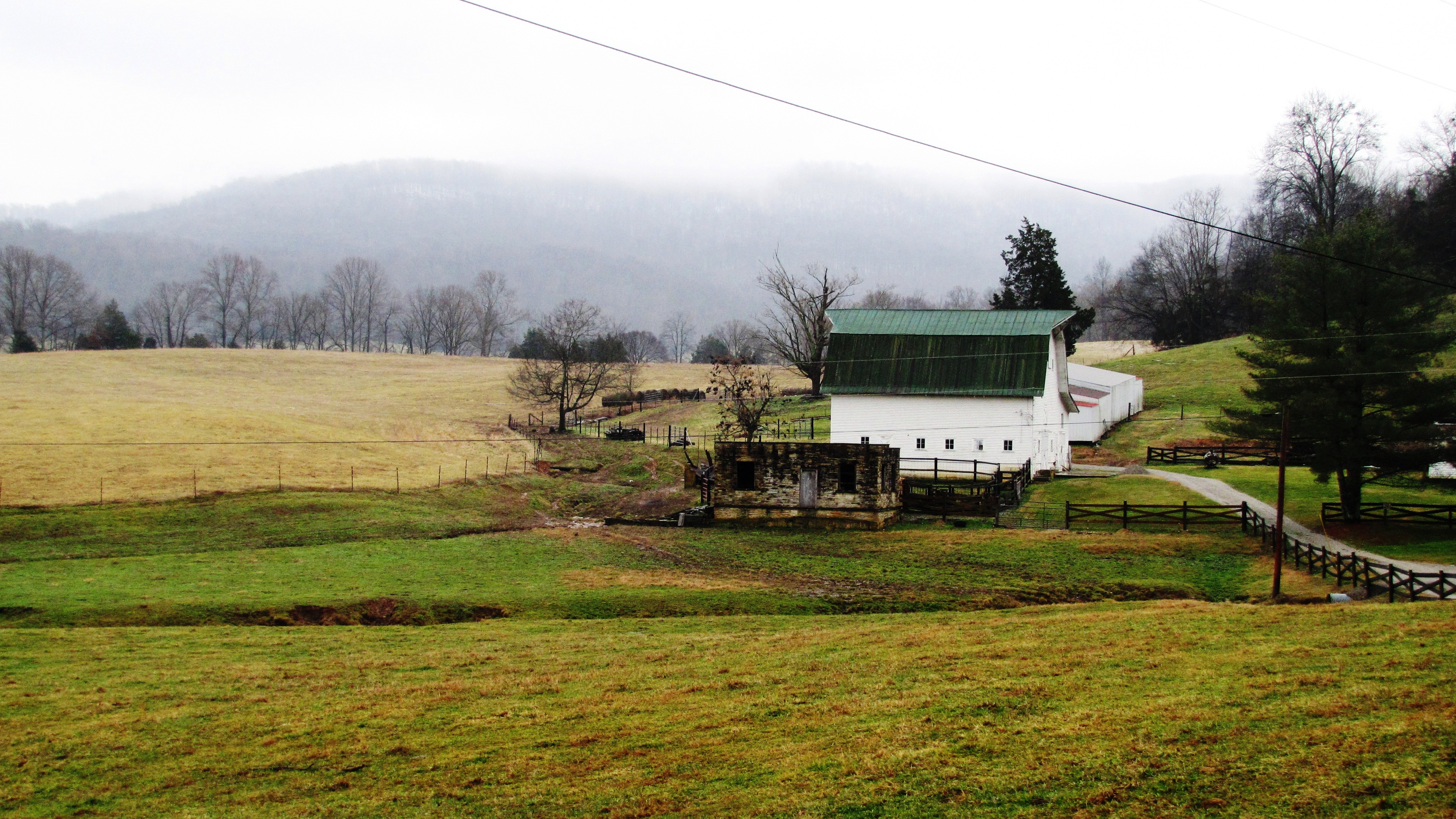
- Farm in Alpine, with Alpine Mountain in the distance

- Location within the state of Tennessee Alpine, Tennessee (the United States)
- Coordinates: 36°23′41″N 85°13′01″W
- Country: United States
- State: Tennessee
- County: Overton
- Elevation: 912 ft (278 m)

Population (2000)
  - Total: 497
- Time zone: UTC-6 (Central (CST))
  - Summer (DST): UTC-5 (CDT)
- ZIP code: 38543
- Area code: 931
- FIPS code: 47133
- GNIS feature ID: 001275634

Alpine is a small unincorporated community in Overton County, Tennessee, United States. It is served by the ZIP Code of 38543, for which the ZCTA had a population of 497 at the 2000 census.

Alpine is part of the Cookeville, Tennessee Micropolitan Statistical Area.

== History ==
Alpine was originally known as "Nettle Carrier," the name being derived from a Cherokee chief who lived in a nearby village. For most of its history, Alpine has been home to the Alpine Institute, a mission school that thrived at various times throughout the 19th and early-20th centuries. The Nettle Carrier post office was established in 1845, and the name was changed to "Alpine" (after the school) in 1921.

== Geography ==
Alpine is located in a narrow valley carved by Nettlecarrier Creek, which empties into the Obey River east of the community. The valley, situated in an area where the Cumberland Plateau gives way to the Highland Rim, is surrounded by hills and high ridges on all sides, most notably Alpine Mountain, which rises nearly 1,000 feet (300 m) above the community to the south. Tennessee State Route 52 provides the only major road access to Alpine, connecting the community with Livingston about 10 miles (16 km) to the west and with Jamestown about 20 miles (32 km) to the east.

== Demographics ==
As of the census of 2000, 497 persons resided in the ZCTA, living in 290 housing units with a median age of 44.5 years old. The majority of the population rested within the 18-65 age range, at 394, while there were 83 persons over 65; the remaining population was children. At 248 men, males compose 49.9% of the population, with women making up 50.1% with 249. With 290 housing units, that makes for a housing density sitting at a mere .12/sq mi (.31/km^{2}).

The racial makeup of the ZCTA was 98% White, 1% American Indian and Alaskan Native, 0.2% from other races, and 0.8% from two or more races. Hispanic or Latino of any race were 1.2% of the population.

The average household size was 2.32, 86.9% of the residents owned their home while 13.1% rented; in total occupying 214 (73.8%) of the 290 homes in Alpine.

Of the 403 residents over 25 years of age, 197 held a high school diploma or higher, while 19 held a bachelor's degree or higher.

79 residents were of civilian veteran status in Alpine, and 72 residents (between ages 21 and 64) were disabled. 203 residents over the age of 16 were employed, all traveling a mean time of 35 minutes to their place of employment. The median income for a household was $26,923, the median income for a family being $30,083, and per capita income was at $16,824. 21 families and 91 persons were living below the poverty line.
