= Herbert A. Meyer =

American politician

Herbert Alton Meyer
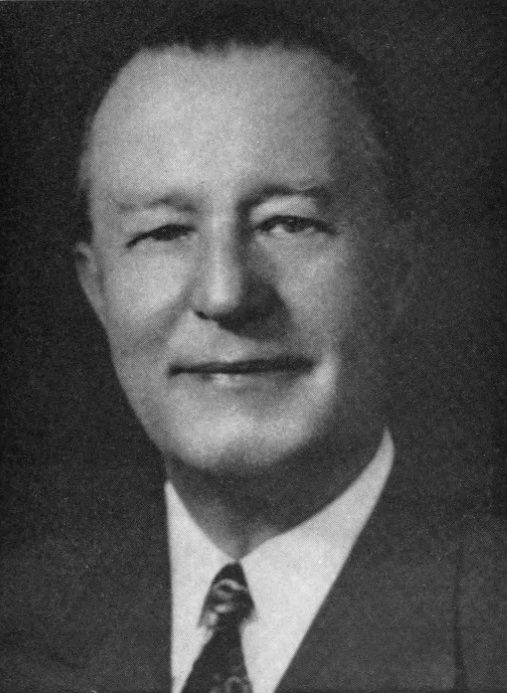

Member of the U.S. House of Representatives from Kansas's 3rd district
- In office January 3, 1947 – October 2, 1950
- Preceded by: Thomas Daniel Winter
- Succeeded by: Myron V. George

Personal details
- Born: August 30, 1886 Chillicothe, Ohio
- Died: October 2, 1950 (aged 64) Bethesda, Maryland
- Party: Republican

Military service
- Allegiance: United States of America
- Branch/service: United States Army Air Service
- Rank: Captain
- Battles/wars: World War I

Herbert Alton Meyer (August 30, 1886 – October 2, 1950) was a U.S. representative from Kansas.

Born in Chillicothe, Ohio, Meyer attended the grade schools, Washington, D.C., the Staunton Military Academy, Staunton, Virginia from 1900 to 1904, the George Washington University, Washington, D.C. from 1905 to 1908, and was graduated from National University Law School, Washington, D.C., in 1910. He was admitted to the bar in 1910.

During the First World War served as a captain in the United States Army Air Service. He served as assistant to the Secretary of the Interior 1915-1917. He was an executive of an oil marketing company from 1919 to 1937. In 1940, Meyer became publisher of the Independence Daily Reporter.

== Death ==
Meyer defeated the incumbent in the Republican primary and was elected to the Eightieth and, after winning the nomination again over Winter, the Eighty-first Congresses. Meyer won renomination over a new challenger for a third term. He served from January 3, 1947, until his death from a heart attack at the Bethesda Naval Hospital in Bethesda, Maryland, October 2, 1950. He was interred in Mount Hope Cemetery, Independence, Kansas.

== See also ==
- List of members of the United States Congress who died in office (1950–1999)

U.S. House of Representatives
Preceded by Thomas D. Winter	Member of the U.S. House of Representatives from Kansas's 3rd congressional district January 3, 1947 – October 2, 1950	Succeeded by Myron V. George
