= Myron V. George =

American politician

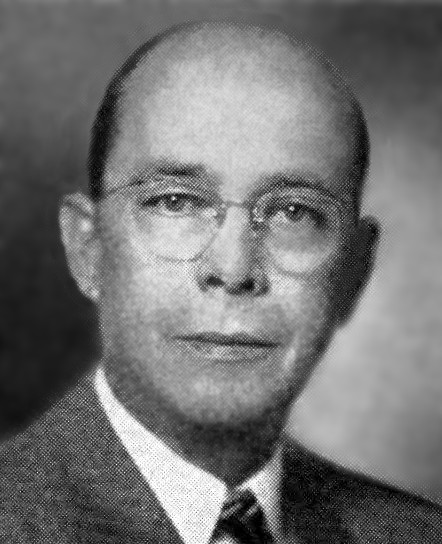

Member of the U.S. House of Representatives from Kansas's 3rd district
- In office November 7, 1950 – January 3, 1959
- Preceded by: Herbert Alton Meyer
- Succeeded by: Denver David Hargis

Personal details
- Born: January 6, 1900 Erie, Kansas, U.S.
- Died: April 11, 1972 (aged 72) Parsons, Kansas, U.S.
- Party: Republican
- Spouse: Hazel Eplee (m. 1923)
- Children: 3
- Parents: Frank E. George (father); Elizabeth Kyle (mother)
- Occupation: Newspaper publisher; politician

Military service
- Allegiance: United States
- Branch: United States Army
- Years of service: 1917–1919
- Rank: Corporal
- Conflict: World War I

Myron Virgil George (January 6, 1900 – April 11, 1972) was a U.S. representative from Kansas.

George was born in Erie, Kansas, the son of Frank E. and Elizabeth (née Kyle) George. He attended grade schools and graduated from Labette County High School at Altamont, Kansas. Enlisted in April 1917 and served in the United States Army with rank of corporal until discharged in May 1919. He learned the printing trade at the Altamont Journal, published by his father.

George married Hazel Eplee on April 2, 1923, in Parsons, Kansas, and they had three children, Elaine, Don, and Richard. He was owner and publisher of the Edna Sun from 1924 to 1941. He was an officer with Kansas State Highway Commission from 1939 to 1950.

George was elected as a Republican to the Eighty-first Congress on November 7, 1950, in a special election to fill the vacancy caused by the death of Herbert Alton Meyer and at the same time was elected to the Eighty-second Congress. He was reelected to the three succeeding Congresses, and served from November 7, 1950, to January 3, 1959. George voted in favor of the Civil Rights Act of 1957. He was an unsuccessful candidate for reelection in 1958 to the Eighty-sixth Congress. He engaged in public relations in the transportation and construction fields. Resided in Parsons, Kansas, until his death there April 11, 1972. He was interred in Memorial Lawn Cemetery.

U.S. House of Representatives
Preceded by Herbert Alton Meyer	Member of the U.S. House of Representatives from Kansas's 3rd congressional district November 7, 1950 – January 3, 1959	Succeeded by Denver David Hargis
