= Alpine Institute =

- U.S. National Register of Historic Places
- U.S. Historic district
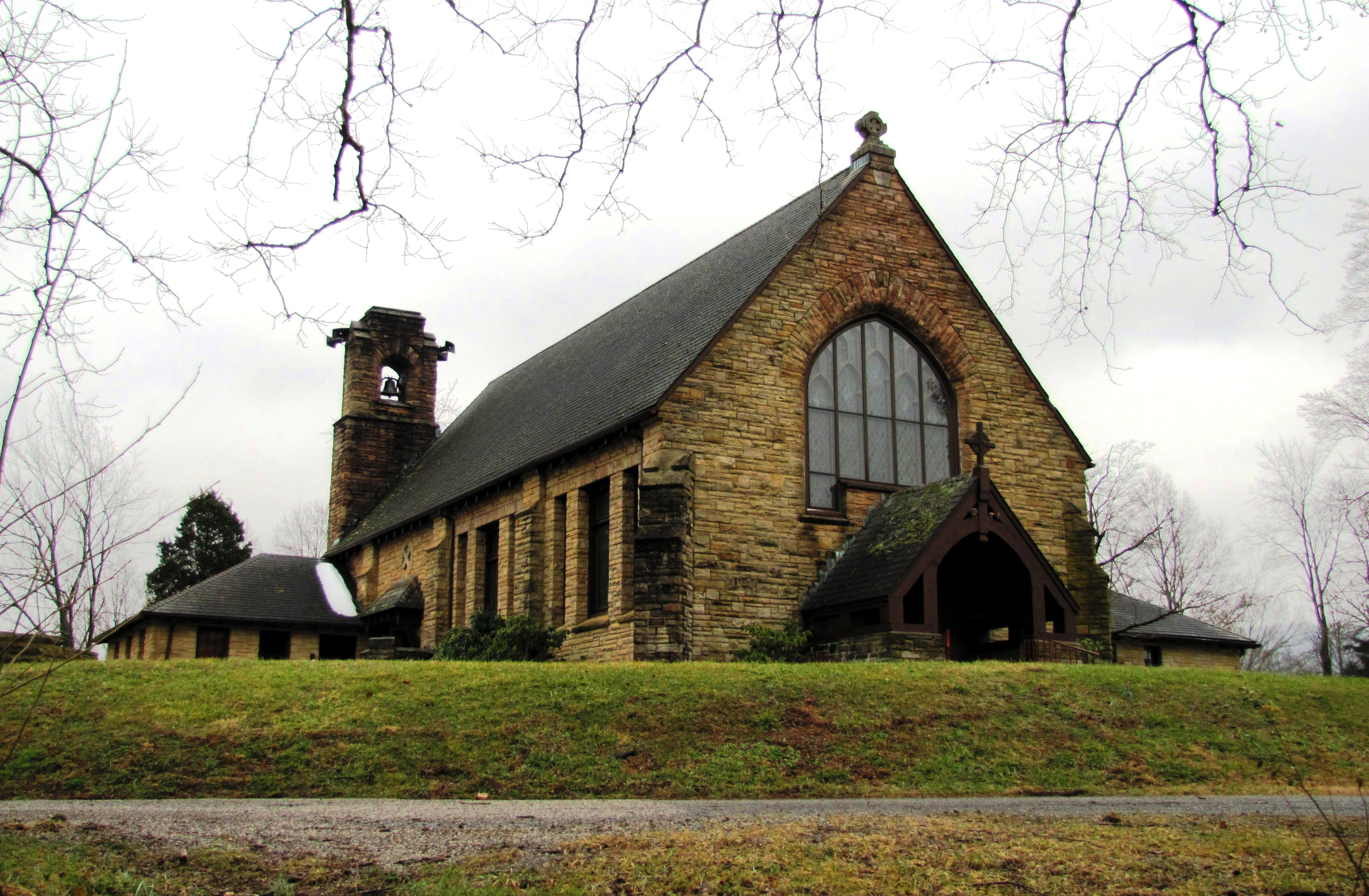
- Christ Church Presbyterian at the old Alpine Institute campus

- Location within Tennessee Location within the United States
- Location: State Route 52
- Nearest city: Alpine, Tennessee
- Coordinates: 36°23′35″N 85°13′8″W
- Area: 25 acres (10 ha)
- Built: 1920
- Architectural style: Gothic Revival
- NRHP reference No.: 02001339
- Added to NRHP: November 15, 2002

The Alpine Institute was a Presbyterian mission school located in Overton County, Tennessee, United States. Operating in one form or another from 1821 until 1947, the school provided badly needed educational services to children living in the remote hill country of the Upper Cumberland region. In 2002, several of the school's surviving structures were added to the National Register of Historic Places as a historic district.

John Dillard (1793–1884), a minister affiliated with the Cumberland Presbyterian Church of Southern Appalachia, established the Alpine School atop Alpine Mountain in 1821 and expanded the school in the 1840s. The school was burned by bushwhackers during the Civil War and again by the Ku Klux Klan in the years after the war. The school was re-established in 1880 at its current location at the base of Alpine Mountain, and under the leadership of future Tennessee governor A. H. Roberts continued to thrive into the following decade. In 1917, the better-funded Presbyterian Church (U.S.A.) assumed control of the school and helped it develop into one of the state's most competitive rural schools.

== Location ==
The Alpine Institute was located along Highway 52 (Jamestown Highway) in the Alpine community, just over 10 miles (16 km) east of Livingston. This community is situated in a valley carved by Nettlecarrier Creek (which empties into the Obey River just east of Alpine), and is surrounded by high ridges on all sides, most notably the 1,826-foot (557 m) Alpine Mountain, which rises prominently to the south. A one-lane road, Campus Circle, accesses the church and adjacent buildings. The farm once operated by the school is accessible from Mountain Lane (which intersects Campus Circle near the church) and Pat Carr Lane.

== History ==
=== Early history ===
John Dillard, a minister from Virginia who helped establish the Cumberland Presbyterian Church in 1810, is generally credited with the founding of "Alpine Academy" in 1821, although some sources argue his later partner Christopher Organ founded the school before 1821, while others suggest both men founded schools that were later merged. In any case, Dillard and Organ were working together by the 1840s, and had managed to build a relatively sizeable campus atop Alpine Mountain. The school's faculty during this period included Dillard's son, William, and future Illinois governor John Beveridge.

During the Civil War, law and order almost completely disappeared in the Upper Cumberland region, and the Alpine school was destroyed by bushwhackers. The school attempted to rebuild after the end of the war, but these efforts were thwarted when the Ku Klux Klan burned what remained of the school's campus. By 1866, Dillard had left the state, and efforts to re-establish the Alpine school were temporarily abandoned.

=== The Davis and Roberts years (1880s and 1890s) ===
In 1880, Alpine Academy was re-established at its current location in the Alpine community at the base of Alpine Mountain. The school initially had five faculty who pursued "no stereotyped or threadbare system of instruction," and the school's first catalog listed an enrollment of 94 males and 48 females. Led by its able principal, W. T. Davis, the school continued to grow throughout the decade.

In 1891, Alpine native Albert H. Roberts (1868–1946)— who would later serve as governor of Tennessee— took over as the school's principal, and renamed the school "Alpine Institute." By this time, the school had six faculty members, of which three had college degrees. The school offered instruction in "primary," "intermediate," and "collegiate" courses. The intermediate curriculum included courses in geography, history, geology, and algebra. The collegiate curriculum included courses in geometry, trigonometry, botany, chemistry, and classical studies, namely Latin and Greek.

=== Presbyterian Church, USA (1917–1947) ===
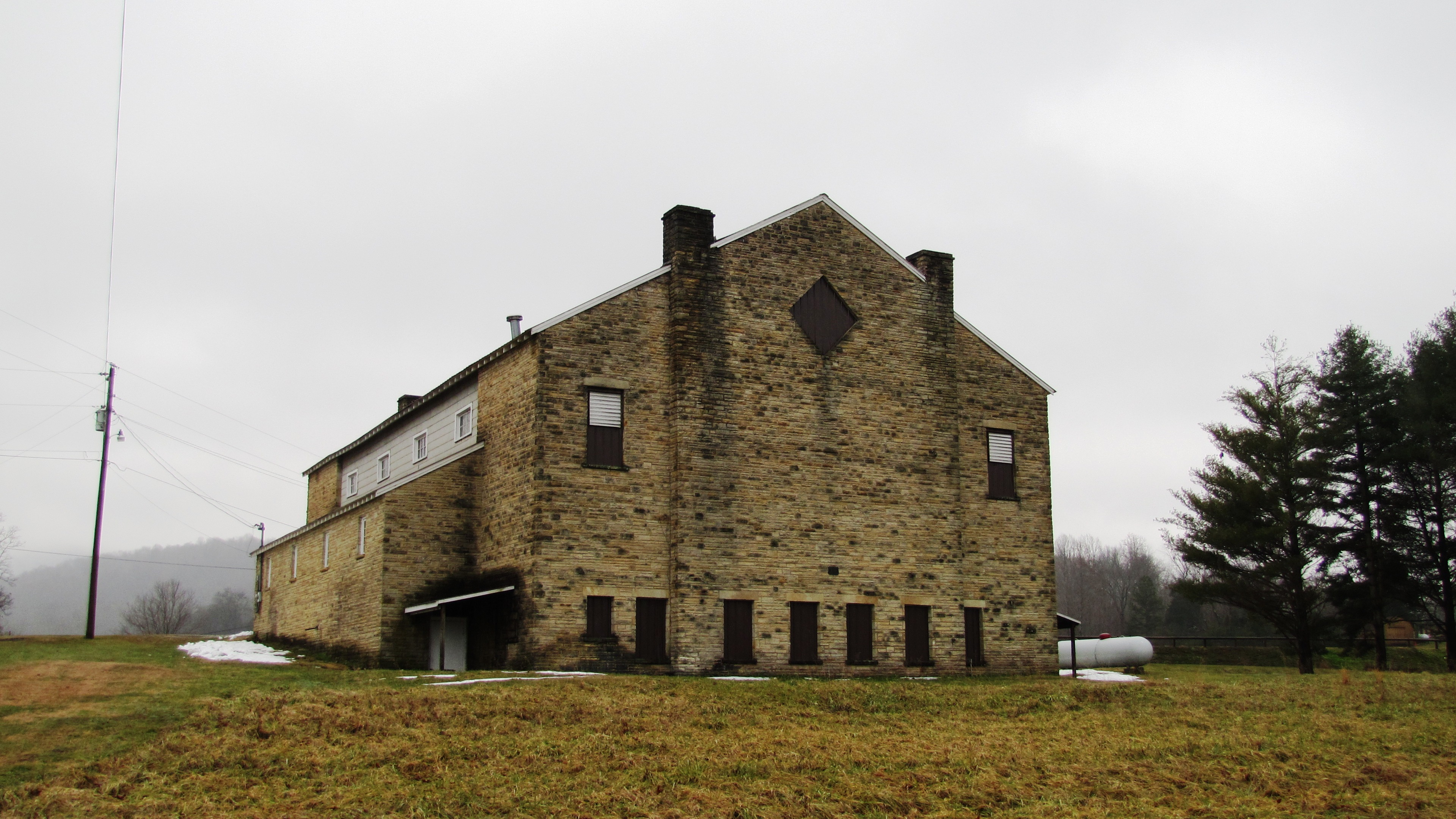
Alpine Institute Gymnasium, completed 1939

After Roberts' departure, the Alpine Institute dropped its collegiate curriculum, and by the 1900s (decade) had devolved into an ordinary school. In 1913, the Presbyterian Church USA's National Missions superintendent for Middle Tennessee toured the Upper Cumberland, and noted that the Alpine school was meeting only three months out of the year. A subsequent survey found the region's rural areas to badly in need of basic educational facilities, and in 1917 the church's Board of Missions agreed to re-establish the Alpine Institute. The school's first class graduated in 1924.

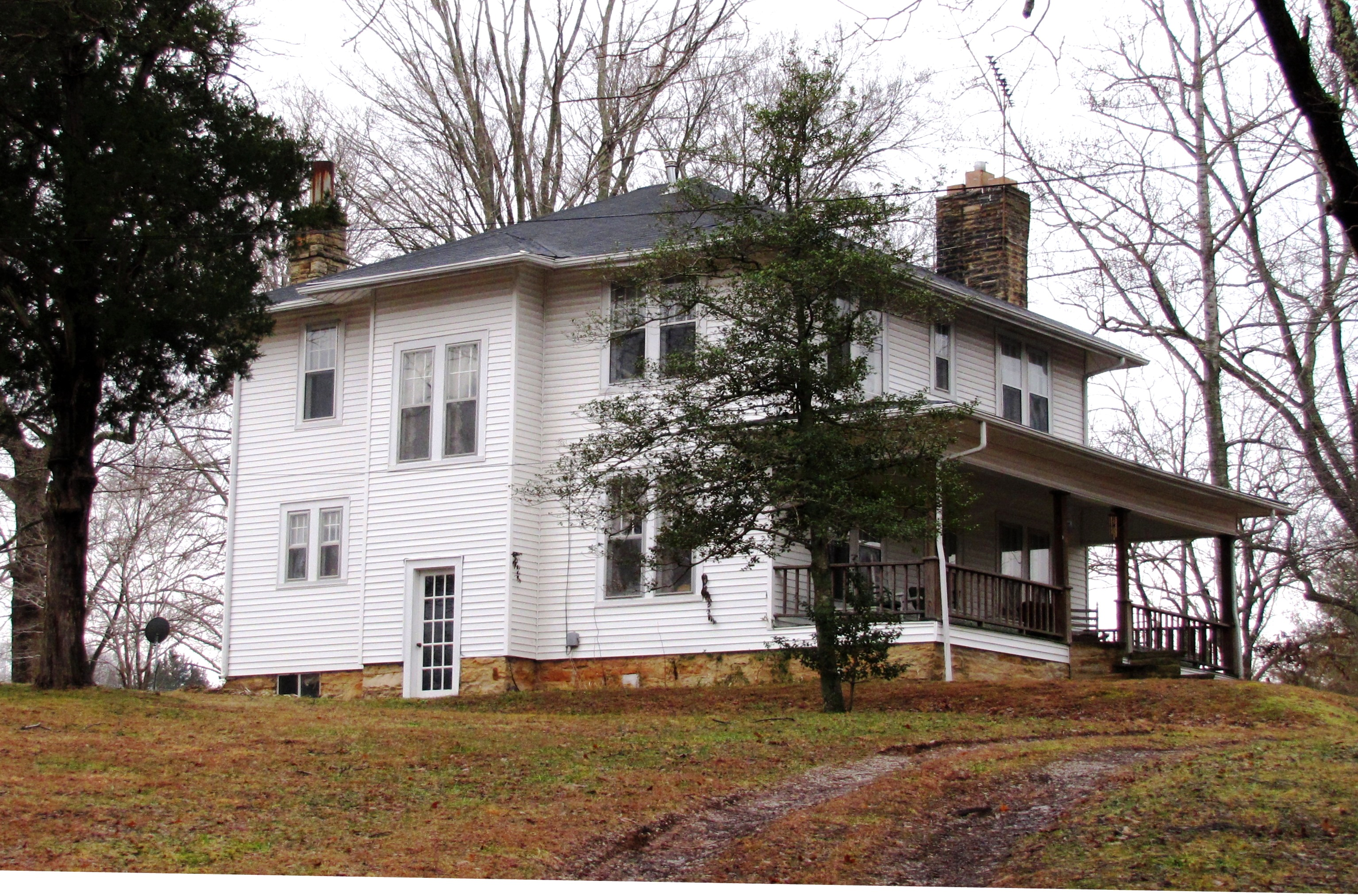
Alpine Institute manse (now a private residence)

A teacherage was built shortly after the school opened, and a larger school building, known as "Miller Hall," was completed in 1922. By the 1930s, the school had its own dispensary with a full-time nurse, a woodshop building, a manse, and two dormitories. The school's Christ Church Presbyterian, a Gothic Revival-style church, was completed in 1934. A gymnasium was built in 1939 with help from the Works Progress Administration. The school also operated a 100-acre (40 ha) dairy farm where students could work rather than pay tuition.

As Tennessee's roads improved in the 1930s, rural schools began to consolidate. Overton County's public school system took over the operations of Alpine's grade school in 1936. This grade school was merged with several other schools to form A. H. Roberts Elementary School in Livingston in 1987. Alpine Institute's high school was closed in 1947, and its students were transferred to Livingston Academy.

== The Alpine Institute campus today ==
While Alpine Institute's main school building no longer stands, several important structures associated with the school have survived. The Christ Church Presbyterian is well-maintained and still used for religious services. The school's gymnasium is now used as a community center, and the manse is still in use as a residence. Other surviving structures include the shop building and a dairy barn. The gymnasium, church, and shop building were all built using the same type of native stone.

== See also ==
- Vardy Community School
