= List of new members of the 101st United States Congress =

The 101st United States Congress began on January 3, 1989. There were 11 new senators (five Democrats, six Republicans) and 31 new representatives (16 Democrats, 15 Republicans), as well as one new delegate (a Democrat) at the start of the first session. Additionally, two senators (one Democrat, one Republican) and 12 representatives (nine Democrats, three Republicans) took office on various dates in order to fill vacancies during the 101st Congress before it ended on January 3, 1991.

== Senate ==
=== Took office January 3, 1989 ===
State	Image	Senator	Seniority	Switched party	Prior background	Birth year	Ref
Connecticut		Joe Lieberman (D)	10th (99th overall)	Yes (Note: Lieberman became an independent who caucused with Democrats in January 2007, at the start of the 110th Congress.); Defeated Lowell Weicker (R)	Connecticut Attorney General; Connecticut State Senate	1942	
Florida		Connie Mack III (R)	5th (94th overall)	Yes; Open seat; replaced Lawton Chiles (D)	U.S. House of Representatives (Note: Elected in the 98th Congress, serving from 1983 to 1989 in the Florida's 13th congressional district.)	1940	
Indiana (Class 3)		Dan Coats (R)	4th (93rd overall)	No; Appointed; replaced Dan Quayle (R)	U.S. House of Representatives (Note: Elected in the 97th Congress, serving from 1981 to 1989 in the Indiana's 4th congressional district.); U.S. Army Staff Sergeant	1943	
Mississippi		Trent Lott (R)	2nd (91st overall)	Yes; Open seat; replaced John C. Stennis (D)	U.S. House of Representatives (Note: Elected in the 93rd Congress, serving from 1973 to 1989 in the Mississippi's 5th congressional district.)	1941	
Montana		Conrad Burns (R)	11th (100th overall)	Yes; Defeated John Melcher (D)	Yellowstone County Commission; U.S. Marine Corps	1935	
Nebraska		Bob Kerrey (D)	8th (97th overall)	Yes; Defeated David Karnes (R)	Governor of Nebraska; U.S. Navy SEAL	1943	
Nevada		Richard Bryan (D)	6th (95th overall)	Yes; Defeated Chic Hecht (R)	Governor of Nevada; Nevada Attorney General; U.S. Army	1937	
Vermont		Jim Jeffords (R)	3rd (92nd overall)	No (Note: Jeffords became an independent who caucused with Democrats in June 2001, during the 107th Congress.); Open seat; replaced Robert Stafford (R)	U.S. House of Representatives (Note: Elected in the 94th Congress, serving from 1975 to 1989 in the Vermont's at-large congressional district.); Vermont Attorney General; U.S. Navy Reserve Captain	1934	
Virginia		Chuck Robb (D)	7th (96th overall)	Yes; Open seat; replaced Paul Trible (R)	Governor of Virginia; Lieutenant Governor of Virginia; U.S. Marine Corps Major	1939	
Washington		Slade Gorton (R)	1st (90th overall)	No; Open seat; replaced Daniel J. Evans (R)	U.S. Senate (Note: Previously elected to the 97th Congress, serving from 1981 to 1987.); Attorney General of Washington; Washington House of Representatives; U.S. Air Force Reserve Colonel	1928	
Wisconsin		Herb Kohl (D)	9th (98th overall)	No; Open seat; replaced William Proxmire (D)	Chair of the Democratic Party of Wisconsin; U.S. Army Reserve	1935	

=== Took office during the 101st Congress ===
State	Image	Senator	Took office	Switched party	Prior background	Birth year	Ref
Hawaii		Daniel Akaka (D)	May 16, 1990	No; Appointed; replaced Spark Matsunaga (D)	U.S. House of Representatives (Note: Elected in the 95th Congress, serving from 1977 to 1990 in the Hawaii's 2nd congressional district.); U.S. Army Corporal	1924	
New Hampshire		Bob Smith (R)	December 7, 1990	No; Open seat; replaced Gordon J. Humphrey (R)	U.S. House of Representatives (Note: Elected in the 99th Congress, serving from 1985 to 1990 in the New Hampshire's 1st congressional district.); U.S. Navy Reserve	1941	

== House of Representatives ==
=== Took office January 3, 1989 ===
District	Representative	Switched party	Prior background	Birth year	Ref
California 12	Tom Campbell (R)	No	State Senator	1952	
California 40	Christopher Cox (R)	No	Attorney	1952	
California 42	Dana Rohrabacher (R)	No	Press secretary	1947	
Florida 4	Craig James (R)	Yes	Lawyer	1941	
Florida 6	Cliff Stearns (R)	Yes	Engineer	1941	
Florida 13	Porter Goss (R)	No	CIA officer	1938	
Florida 14	Harry Johnston (D)	No	State Senate President	1931	
Georgia 4	Ben Jones (D)	Yes	Actor	1941	
Illinois 4	George E. Sangmeister (D)	Yes	State Senator	1931	
Illinois 22	Glenn Poshard (D)	No	State Senator	1945	
Massachusetts 2	Richard Neal (D)	No	Mayor of Springfield	1949	
Mississippi 4	Michael Parker (D)	No (Note: Parker joined the Republican Party in November 1995, during the 104th Congress.)	Businessman	1949	
Mississippi 5	Larkin I. Smith (R)	No	Sheriff	1944	
Missouri 7	Mel Hancock (R)	No	Advocate	1929	
Nebraska 2	Peter Hoagland (D)	Yes	State Senator	1941	
New Hampshire 2	Charles Douglas III (R)	No	State Supreme Court Justice	1942	
New Jersey 10	Donald M. Payne (D)	No	City Councilor	1934	
New Mexico 1	Steven Schiff (R)	No	Lawyer	1947	
New York 19	Eliot Engel (D)	No	State Assemblyman	1947	
New York 20	Nita Lowey (D)	Yes	Assistant Secretary of State of New York	1937	
New York 23	Michael McNulty (D)	No	State Assemblyman	1947	
New York 27	James T. Walsh (R)	No	City Council President	1947	
New York 31	Bill Paxon (R)	No	State Assemblyman	1954	
Ohio 5	Paul Gillmor (R)	No	State Senate President	1939	
Rhode Island 1	Ronald Machtley (R)	Yes	U.S. Navy Reserve Commander	1948	
Tennessee 8	John Tanner (D)	No	State Representative	1944	
Texas 13	Bill Sarpalius (D)	Yes	State Senator	1948	
Texas 14	Greg Laughlin (D)	Yes	Lawyer	1942	
Vermont at-large	Peter Plympton Smith (R)	No	Lieutenant Governor of Vermont	1945	
Washington 3	Jolene Unsoeld (D)	No	State Representative	1931	
Washington 7	Jim McDermott (D)	No	State Senator	1936	

==== Non-voting delegates ====
District	Delegate	Switched party	Prior background	Birth year	Ref
American Samoa at-large	Eni Faleomavaega (D)	No	Lieutenant Governor of American Samoa	1943	

=== Took office during the 101st Congress ===
District	Representative	Took office	Switched party	Prior background	Birth year	Ref
Indiana 4	Jill Long Thompson (D)	March 28, 1989	Yes	Educator	1952	
Alabama 3	Glen Browder (D)	April 4, 1989	No	Secretary of State of Alabama	1943	
Wyoming at-large	Craig L. Thomas (R)	April 26, 1989	No	State Representative	1933	
Florida 18	Ileana Ros-Lehtinen (R)	August 29, 1989	Yes	State Senator	1952	
California 15	Gary Condit (D)	September 12, 1989	No	State Assemblyman	1948	
Texas 12	Pete Geren (D)	September 12, 1989	No	Attorney	1952	
Mississippi 5	Gene Taylor (D)	October 17, 1989	Yes	State Senator	1953	
Texas 18	Craig Washington (D)	December 9, 1989	No	State Senator	1941	
New York 14	Susan Molinari (R)	March 20, 1990	No	City Councilor	1958	
New York 18	José E. Serrano (D)	March 20, 1990	No	State Assemblyman	1943	
Hawaii 2	Patsy Mink (D)	September 22, 1990	No	U.S. Representative (Note: Previously elected to the 89th Congress, serving from 1965 to 1977.)	1927	
New Jersey 1	Rob Andrews (D)	November 6, 1990	No	Chosen Freeholder	1957	

== See also ==
- List of United States representatives in the 101st Congress
- List of United States senators in the 101st Congress

== Notes ==
Preceded by New members of the 100th Congress	New members of the 101st Congress; 1989–1991	Succeeded by New members of the 102nd Congress
