= List of new members of the 102nd United States Congress =

The 102nd United States Congress began on January 3, 1991. There were three new senators (one Democrat, two Republicans) and 43 new representatives (24 Democrats, 18 Republicans, one independent), as well as one new delegate (a Democrat) at the start of the first session. Additionally, six senators (five Democrats, one Republican) and nine representatives (five Democrats, four Republicans) took office on various dates in order to fill vacancies during the 102nd Congress before it ended on January 3, 1993.

== Senate ==
=== Took office January 3, 1991 ===
State	Image	Senator	Seniority	Switched party	Prior background	Birth year	Ref
Colorado		Hank Brown (R)	1st (98th overall)	No; Open seat; replaced William L. Armstrong (R)	U.S. House of Representatives (Note: Elected to the 97th Congress, serving from 1981 to 1991 in Colorado's 4th district.); Colorado Senate	1940	
Idaho		Larry Craig (R)	2nd (99th overall)	No; Open seat; replaced James A. McClure (R)	U.S. House of Representatives (Note: Elected to the 97th Congress, serving from 1981 to 1991 in Idaho's 1st district.); Idaho Senate	1945	
Minnesota		Paul Wellstone (DFL)	3rd (100th overall)	Yes; Defeated Rudy Boschwitz (R)	Academic	1944	

=== Took office during the 102nd Congress ===
State	Image	Senator	Took office	Switched party	Prior background	Birth year	Ref
California		John Seymour (R)	January 10, 1991	No; Appointed; replaced Pete Wilson (R)	California State Senate; Mayor of Anaheim	1937	
Pennsylvania		Harris Wofford (D)	May 9, 1991	Yes; Appointed; replaced John Heinz (R)	Pennsylvania Secretary of Labor; Pennsylvania Democratic Party Chair	1926	
North Dakota (Class 1)		Jocelyn Burdick (D–NPL)	September 16, 1992	No; Appointed; replaced Quentin Burdick (D–NPL)	Radio announcer	1922	
California		Dianne Feinstein (D)	November 10, 1992	Yes; Defeated John Seymour (R)	Mayor of San Francisco; San Francisco Board of Supervisors	1933	
North Dakota (Class 3)		Byron Dorgan (D–NPL)	December 15, 1992	No; Open seat; replaced Kent Conrad (D–NPL) (Note: Conrad had planned to retire at the end of this Congress and initially not to run for re-election; however, he subsequently decided to run in the Class I seat for the special election to succeed appointee Jocelyn Burdick. He then won to succeed her and retained his seniority.)	U.S. House of Representatives (Note: Elected to the 97th Congress, serving from 1981 to 1992 in North Dakota's at-large district.); North Dakota Tax Commissioner	1942	
Tennessee		Harlan Mathews (D)	January 2, 1993	No; Appointed; replaced Al Gore (D)	Tennessee State Treasurer	1927	

== House of Representatives ==
=== Took office January 3, 1991 ===
District	Representative	Switched party	Prior background	Birth year	Ref
Alabama 5	Robert E. Cramer (D)	No	District Attorney	1947	
Arkansas 2	Ray Thornton (D)	Yes	U.S. Representative (Note: Previously elected to the 93rd Congress, serving from 1973 to 1979 in the 4th district.)	1928	
California 1	Frank Riggs (R)	Yes	Real estate executive	1950	
California 14	John Doolittle (R)	No	State Senator	1950	
California 17	Cal Dooley (D)	Yes	Rancher	1954	
California 29	Maxine Waters (D)	No	State Assemblywoman	1938	
California 44	Duke Cunningham (R)	Yes	Navy Commander	1941	
Colorado 4	Wayne Allard (R)	No	State Senator	1943	
Connecticut 3	Rosa DeLauro (D)	No	Chief of staff	1943	
Connecticut 5	Gary Franks (R)	No	Alderman	1953	
Florida 2	Pete Peterson (D)	Yes	Contractor	1935	
Florida 11	Jim Bacchus (D)	No	Attorney	1949	
Hawaii 1	Neil Abercrombie (D)	Yes	U.S. Representative (Note: Previously elected to the 99th Congress, serving from 1986 to 1987.)	1938	
Idaho 1	Larry LaRocco (D)	Yes	Broker	1946	
Illinois 16	John W. Cox Jr. (D)	Yes	State Attorney	1947	
Indiana 3	Tim Roemer (D)	Yes	Congressional staffer	1956	
Iowa 2	Jim Nussle (R)	No	District Attorney	1960	
Kansas 5	Dick Nichols (R)	No	Banker	1926	
Louisiana 2	William J. Jefferson (D)	No	State Senator	1947	
Maine 1	Thomas Andrews (D)	No	State Senator	1953	
Maryland 1	Wayne Gilchrest (R)	Yes	Educator	1946	
Michigan 10	Dave Camp (R)	No	State Representative	1953	
Michigan 13	Barbara-Rose Collins (D)	No	City Councilor	1939	
Minnesota 3	Jim Ramstad (R)	No	State Senator	1946	
Minnesota 7	Collin Peterson (DFL)	Yes	State Senator	1944	
Missouri 2	Joan Kelly Horn (D)	Yes	Real estate developer	1936	
Nebraska 3	Bill Barrett (R)	No	State Senator	1929	
New Hampshire 1	Bill Zeliff (R)	No	Businessman	1936	
New Hampshire 2	Richard Swett (D)	Yes	Architect	1957	
New Jersey 12	Dick Zimmer (R)	No	State Senator	1944	
North Carolina 11	Charles H. Taylor (R)	Yes	State Senator	1941	
Ohio 1	Charlie Luken (D)	No	City Councilor	1951	
Ohio 7	Dave Hobson (R)	No	State Senator	1936	
Ohio 8	John Boehner (R)	No	State Representative	1949	
Oklahoma 3	William K. Brewster (D)	No	State Representative	1941	
Oregon 5	Michael J. Kopetski (D)	Yes	State Representative	1949	
Pennsylvania 18	Rick Santorum (R)	Yes	Lawyer	1958	
Rhode Island 2	Jack Reed (D)	Yes	State Senator	1949	
Texas 11	Chet Edwards (D)	No	State Senator	1951	
Utah 3	Bill Orton (D)	Yes	Lawyer	1948	
Vermont at-large	Bernie Sanders (I)	Yes	Mayor of Burlington	1941	
Virginia 8	Jim Moran (D)	Yes	Mayor of Alexandria	1945	
Wisconsin 2	Scott L. Klug (R)	Yes	Journalist	1953	

==== Non-voting delegates ====
District	Delegate	Switched party	Prior background	Birth year	Ref
District of Columbia at-large	Eleanor Holmes Norton (D)	No	Chair of the EEOC	1937	

=== Took office during the 102nd Congress ===
District	Representative	Took office	Switched party	Prior background	Birth year	Ref
Texas 3	Sam Johnson (R)	May 8, 1991	No	State Representative	1930	
Massachusetts 1	John Olver (D)	June 18, 1991	Yes	State Senator	1936	
Illinois 15	Thomas W. Ewing (R)	July 2, 1991	No	State Representative	1935	
Arizona 2	Ed Pastor (D)	October 3, 1991	No	County Supervisor	1943	
Pennsylvania 2	Lucien Blackwell (D)	November 5, 1991	No	City Councilor	1931	
Virginia 7	George Allen (R)	November 5, 1991	No	State Delegate	1952	
New York 17	Jerry Nadler (D)	November 3, 1992	No	State Assemblyman	1947	
North Carolina 1	Eva Clayton (D)	November 3, 1992	No	County Commissioner	1934	

==== Non-voting delegates ====
District	Delegate	Took office	Switched party	Prior background	Birth year	Ref
Puerto Rico at-large	Antonio Colorado (PD/D)	March 4, 1992	No	Secretary of State of Puerto Rico	1939	

== See also ==
- List of United States representatives in the 102nd Congress
- List of United States senators in the 102nd Congress

== Notes ==
Preceded by New members of the 101st Congress	New members of the 102nd Congress; 1991–1993	Succeeded by New members of the 103rd Congress
