= List of United States senators in the 102nd Congress =

This is a complete list of United States senators during the 102nd United States Congress listed by seniority from January 3, 1991, to January 3, 1993.

Order of service is based on the commencement of the senator's first term. Behind this is former service as a senator (only giving the senator seniority within their new incoming class), service as vice president, a House member, a cabinet secretary, or a state governor. The final factor is the population of the senator's state.

In this congress, Ernest Hollings (D-South Carolina) was the most senior junior senator and Bob Graham (D-Florida) was the most junior senior senator at the start of the congress until Quentin Burdick's death on September 8, 1992, after which Kent Conrad (D-North Dakota) became the most junior senior senator.

Senators who were sworn in during the middle of the two-year congressional term (up until the last senator who was not sworn in early after winning the November 1992 election) are listed at the end of the list with no number.

== Terms of service ==
Class	Terms of service of senators that expired in years
Class 3	Terms of service of senators that expired in 1993 (AK, AL, AR, AZ, CA, CO, CT, FL, GA, HI, IA, ID, IL, IN, KS, KY, LA, MD, MO, NC, ND, NH, NV, NY, OH, OK, OR, PA, SC, SD, UT, VT, WA, and WI.)
Class 1	Terms of service of senators that expired in 1995 (AZ, CA, CT, DE, FL, HI, IN, MA, MD, ME, MI, MN, MO, MS, MT, ND, NE, NJ, NM, NV, NY, OH, PA, RI, TN, TX, UT, VA, VT, WA, WI, WV, and WY.)
Class 2	Terms of service of senators that expired in 1997 (AK, AL, AR, CO, DE, GA, IA, ID, IL, KS, KY, LA, MA, ME, MI, MN, MS, MT, NE, NH, NJ, NM, NC, OK, OR, RI, SC, SD, TN, TX, VA, WV, and WY.)

== U.S. Senate seniority list ==
U.S. Senate seniority
Rank	Historical rank	Senator (party-state)	Seniority date	Other factors
1	1549	Strom Thurmond (R-SC)	November 7, 1956	
2	1578	Robert Byrd (D-WV)	January 3, 1959	
3	1593	Quentin Northrup Burdick (D-ND)	August 8, 1960	
4	1601	Claiborne Pell (D-RI)	January 3, 1961	
5	1608	Ted Kennedy (D-MA)	November 7, 1962	
6	1614	Daniel Inouye (D-HI)	January 3, 1963	
7	1632	Ernest Hollings (D-SC)	November 9, 1966	
8	1638	Mark Hatfield (R-OR)	January 10, 1967	
9	1641	Ted Stevens (R-AK)	December 24, 1968	
10	1645	Bob Dole (R-KS)	January 3, 1969	Former representative
11	1649	Alan Cranston (D-CA)	January 3, 1969	California 2nd in population (1960)
12	1652	Bob Packwood (R-OR)	January 3, 1969	Oregon 32nd in population (1960)
13	1656	Bill Roth (R-DE)	January 1, 1971	
14	1658	Lloyd Bentsen (D-TX)	January 3, 1971	
15	1668	Sam Nunn (D-GA)	November 8, 1972	
16	1669	Bennett Johnston Jr. (D-LA)	November 14, 1972	
17	1675	Jesse Helms (R-NC)	January 3, 1973	North Carolina 12th in population (1970)
18	1679	Pete Domenici (R-NM)	January 3, 1973	New Mexico 37th in population (1970)
19	1680	Joe Biden (D-DE)	January 3, 1973	Delaware 46th in population (1970)
20	1683	Jake Garn (R-UT)	December 21, 1974	
21	1684	John Glenn (D-OH)	December 24, 1974	
22	1685	Wendell H. Ford (D-KY)	December 28, 1974	
23	1689	Dale Bumpers (D-AR)	January 3, 1975	Former governor
24	1692	Patrick Leahy (D-VT)	January 3, 1975	
25	1694	John Danforth (R-MO)	December 27, 1976	
26	1681	Howard Metzenbaum (D-OH)	December 29, 1976	Previously a senator
27	1696	John Chafee (R-RI)	December 29, 1976	
28	1697	Donald W. Riegle, Jr. (D-MI)	December 30, 1976	
29	1702	H. John Heinz III (R-PA)	January 3, 1977	Former representative (6 years)
30	1703	Paul Sarbanes (D-MD)	January 3, 1977	Former representative (6 years)
31	1704	Pat Moynihan (D-NY)	January 3, 1977	New York 2nd in population (1970)
32	1705	Richard Lugar (R-IN)	January 3, 1977	Indiana 11th in population (1970)
33	1706	Jim Sasser (D-TN)	January 3, 1977	Tennessee 17th in population (1970)
34	1707	Dennis DeConcini (D-AZ)	January 3, 1977	Arizona 22nd in population (1970)
35	1708	Orrin Hatch (R-UT)	January 3, 1977	Utah 36th in population (1970)
36	1710	Malcolm Wallop (R-WY)	January 3, 1977	Wyoming 49th in population (1970)
37	1716	David Durenberger (R-MN)	November 8, 1978	
38	1717	Max Baucus (D-MT)	December 15, 1978	
39	1718	Nancy Kassebaum Baker (R-KS)	December 23, 1978	
40	1719	Thad Cochran (R-MS)	December 27, 1978	
41	1721	Alan K. Simpson (R-WY)	January 1, 1979	
42	1722	John Warner (R-VA)	January 2, 1979	
43	1723	David Pryor (D-AR)	January 3, 1979	Former representative (6 years, 2 months)
44	1724	William Cohen (R-ME)	January 3, 1979	Former representative (6 years)
45	1727	Larry Pressler (R-SD)	January 3, 1979	Former representative (4 years)
46	1728	David L. Boren (D-OK)	January 3, 1979	Former governor - Oklahoma 27th in population (1970)
47	1729	J. James Exon (D-NE)	January 3, 1979	Former governor - Nebraska 35th in population (1970)
48	1730	Carl Levin (D-MI)	January 3, 1979	Michigan 7th in population (1970)
49	1731	Bill Bradley (D-NJ)	January 3, 1979	New Jersey 8th in population (1970)
50	1732	Howell Heflin (D-AL)	January 3, 1979	Alabama 21st in population (1970)
51	1735	George J. Mitchell (D-ME)	May 17, 1980	
52	1736	Warren Rudman (R-NH)	December 31, 1980	
53	1740	Steve Symms (R-ID)	January 3, 1981	Former representative (12 years)
54	1742	Chris Dodd (D-CT)	January 3, 1981	Former representative (6 years) - Connecticut 24th in population (1970)
55	1743	Chuck Grassley (R-IA)	January 3, 1981	Former representative (6 years) - Iowa 25th in population (1970)
56	1745	Bob Kasten (R-WI)	January 3, 1981	Former representative (4 years)
57	1746	Al D'Amato (R-NY)	January 3, 1981	New York 2nd in population (1970)
58	1747	Arlen Specter (R-PA)	January 3, 1981	Pennsylvania 3rd in population (1970)
59	1748	Alan J. Dixon (D-IL)	January 3, 1981	Illinois 5th in population (1970)
60	1752	Don Nickles (R-OK)	January 3, 1981	Oklahoma 27th in population (1970)
61	1753	Frank Murkowski (R-AK)	January 3, 1981	Alaska 50th in population (1970)
62	1755	Frank Lautenberg (D-NJ)	December 27, 1982	
63	1757	Pete Wilson (R-CA)	January 3, 1983	California 1st in population (1980)
64	1759	Jeff Bingaman (D-NM)	January 3, 1983	New Mexico 37th in population (1980)
65	1761	John Kerry (D-MA)	January 2, 1985	
66	1762	Paul Simon (D-IL)	January 3, 1985	Former representative (10 years) - Illinois 5th in population (1980)
67	1763	Tom Harkin (D-IA)	January 3, 1985	Former representative (10 years) - Iowa 27th in population (1980)
68	1764	Al Gore (D-TN)	January 3, 1985	Former representative (8 years)
69	1765	Phil Gramm (R-TX)	January 3, 1985	Former representative (6 years)
70	1766	Mitch McConnell (R-KY)	January 3, 1985	
71	1767	Jay Rockefeller (D-WV)	January 15, 1985	
72	1769	Terry Sanford (D-NC)	November 5, 1986	
73	1770	John Breaux (D-LA)	January 3, 1987	Former representative (14 years)
74	1771	Brock Adams (D-WA)	January 3, 1987	Former representative (12 years) - Former cabinet secretary
75	1772	Tim Wirth (D-CO)	January 3, 1987	Former representative (12 years)
76	1773	Barbara Mikulski (D-MD)	January 3, 1987	Former representative (10 years)
77	1774	Wyche Fowler (D-GA)	January 3, 1987	Former representative (9 years, 9 months)
78	1775	Richard Shelby (D-AL)	January 3, 1987	Former representative (8 years) - Alabama 22nd in population (1980)
79	1776	Tom Daschle (D-SD)	January 3, 1987	Former representative (8 years) - South Dakota 45th in population (1980)
80	1777	John McCain (R-AZ)	January 3, 1987	Former representative (4 years) - Arizona 29th in population (1980)
81	1778	Harry Reid (D-NV)	January 3, 1987	Former representative (4 years) - Nevada 43rd in population (1980)
82	1779	Bob Graham (D-FL)	January 3, 1987	Former governor - Florida 7th in population (1980)
83	1780	Kit Bond (R-MO)	January 3, 1987	Former governor - Missouri 15th in population (1980)
84	1781	Kent Conrad (D-ND)	January 3, 1987	
85	1751	Slade Gorton (R-WA)	January 3, 1989	Previously a senator
86	1783	Trent Lott (R-MS)	January 3, 1989	Former representative (16 years)
87	1784	Jim Jeffords (R-VT)	January 3, 1989	Former representative (14 years)
89	1785	Dan Coats (R-IN)	January 3, 1989	Former representative (8 years)
90	1786	Connie Mack (R-FL)	January 3, 1989	Former representative (6 years)
91	1787	Richard Bryan (D-NV)	January 3, 1989	Former governor (6 years)
92	1788	Chuck Robb (D-VA)	January 3, 1989	Former governor (4 years) - Virginia 14th in population (1980)
93	1789	Bob Kerrey (D-NE)	January 3, 1989	Former governor (4 years) - Nebraska 35th in population (1980)
93	1790	Herb Kohl (D-WI)	January 3, 1989	Wisconsin 16th in population (1980)
94	1791	Joe Lieberman (D-CT)	January 3, 1989	Connecticut 25th in population (1980)
95	1792	Conrad Burns (R-MT)	January 3, 1989	Montana 44th in population (1980)
96	1793	Daniel Akaka (D-HI)	May 16, 1990	
97	1794	Bob Smith (R-NH)	December 7, 1990	
98	1795	Hank Brown (R-CO)	January 3, 1991	Former representative (10 years)
99	1796	Larry Craig (R-ID)	January 3, 1991	Former representative (6 years)
100	1797	Paul Wellstone (D-MN)	January 3, 1991	
	1798	John F. Seymour (R-CA)	January 10, 1991	
	1799	Harris Wofford (D-PA)	May 9, 1991	
	1800	Jocelyn Burdick (D-ND)	September 16, 1992	
	1801	Dianne Feinstein (D-CA)	November 10, 1992	
	1802	Byron Dorgan (D-ND)	December 15, 1992	
	1803	Harlan Mathews (D-TN)	January 2, 1993	

The most senior senators by class were Robert Byrd (D-West Virginia) from Class 1, Strom Thurmond (R-South Carolina) from Class 2, and Daniel Inouye (D-Hawaii) from Class 3.

== See also ==
- 102nd United States Congress
- List of United States representatives in the 102nd Congress
