= List of United States senators in the 101st Congress =

This is a complete list of United States senators during the 101st United States Congress listed by seniority from January 3, 1989, to January 3, 1991.

Order of service is based on the commencement of the senator's first term. Behind this is former service as a senator (only giving the senator seniority within their new incoming class), service as vice president, a House member, a cabinet secretary, or a governor of a state. The final factor is the population of the senator's state.

In this congress, Ernest Hollings (D-South Carolina) was the most senior junior senator and Bob Graham (D-Florida) was the most junior senior senator.

Senators who were sworn in during the middle of the two-year congressional term (up until the last senator who was not sworn in early after winning the November 1990 election) are listed at the end of the list with no number.

== Terms of service ==
| Class | Terms of service of senators that expired in years |
|---|---|
| Class 2 | Terms of service of senators that expired in 1991 (AK, AL, AR, CO, DE, GA, IA, ID, IL, KS, KY, LA, MA, ME, MI, MN, MS, MT, NC, NE, NH, NJ, NM, OK, OR, RI, SC, SD, TN, TX, VA, WV, and WY.) |
| Class 3 | Terms of service of senators that expired in 1993 (AK, AL, AR, AZ, CA, CO, CT, FL, GA, HI, IA, ID, IL, IN, KS, KY, LA, MD, MO, NC, ND, NH, NV, NY, OH, OK, OR, PA, SC, SD, UT, VT, WA, and WI.) |
| Class 1 | Terms of service of senators that expired in 1995 (AZ, CA, CT, DE, FL, HI, IN, MA, MD, ME, MI, MN, MO, MS, MT, ND, NE, NJ, NM, NV, NY, OH, PA, RI, TN, TX, UT, VA, VT, WA, WI, WV, and WY.) |

== U.S. Senate seniority list ==
U.S. Senate seniority
| Rank | Historical rank | Senator (party-state) | Seniority date | Other factors |
|---|---|---|---|---|
| 1 | 1549 | Strom Thurmond (R-SC) | November 7, 1956 | |
| 2 | 1578 | Robert Byrd (D-WV) | January 3, 1959 | |
| 3 | 1593 | Quentin Northrup Burdick (D-ND) | August 8, 1960 | |
| 4 | 1601 | Claiborne Pell (D-RI) | January 3, 1961 | |
| 5 | 1608 | Ted Kennedy (D-MA) | November 7, 1962 | |
| 6 | 1614 | Daniel Inouye (D-HI) | January 3, 1963 | |
| 7 | 1632 | Ernest Hollings (D-SC) | November 9, 1966 | |
| 8 | 1638 | Mark Hatfield (R-OR) | January 10, 1967 | |
| 9 | 1641 | Ted Stevens (R-AK) | December 24, 1968 | |
| 10 | 1645 | Bob Dole (R-KS) | January 3, 1969 | Former representative |
| 11 | 1649 | Alan Cranston (D-CA) | January 3, 1969 | California 2nd in population (1960) |
| 12 | 1652 | Bob Packwood (R-OR) | January 3, 1969 | Oregon 32nd in population (1960) |
| 13 | 1656 | Bill Roth (R-DE) | January 1, 1971 | |
| 14 | 1658 | Lloyd Bentsen (D-TX) | January 3, 1971 | |
| 15 | 1668 | Sam Nunn (D-GA) | November 8, 1972 | |
| 16 | 1669 | Bennett Johnston Jr. (D-LA) | November 14, 1972 | |
| 17 | 1672 | James A. McClure (R-ID) | January 3, 1973 | Former representative |
| 18 | 1675 | Jesse Helms (R-NC) | January 3, 1973 | North Carolina 12th in population (1970) |
| 19 | 1679 | Pete Domenici (R-NM) | January 3, 1973 | New Mexico 37th in population (1970) |
| 20 | 1680 | Joe Biden (D-DE) | January 3, 1973 | Delaware 46th in population (1970) |
| 21 | 1683 | Jake Garn (R-UT) | December 21, 1974 | |
| 22 | 1684 | John Glenn (D-OH) | December 24, 1974 | |
| 23 | 1685 | Wendell H. Ford (D-KY) | December 28, 1974 | |
| 24 | 1689 | Dale Bumpers (D-AR) | January 3, 1975 | Former governor |
| 25 | 1692 | Patrick Leahy (D-VT) | January 3, 1975 | |
| 26 | 1694 | John Danforth (R-MO) | December 27, 1976 | |
| 27 | 1681 | Howard Metzenbaum (D-OH) | December 29, 1976 | Previously a senator |
| 28 | 1696 | John Chafee (R-RI) | December 29, 1976 | |
| 29 | 1697 | Donald W. Riegle, Jr. (D-MI) | December 30, 1976 | |
| 30 | 1700 | Spark Matsunaga (D-HI) | January 3, 1977 | Former representative (14 years) |
| 31 | 1702 | H. John Heinz III (R-PA) | January 3, 1977 | Former representative (6 years) |
| 32 | 1703 | Paul Sarbanes (D-MD) | January 3, 1977 | Former representative (6 years) |
| 33 | 1704 | Pat Moynihan (D-NY) | January 3, 1977 | New York 2nd in population (1970) |
| 34 | 1705 | Richard Lugar (R-IN) | January 3, 1977 | Indiana 11th in population (1970) |
| 35 | 1706 | Jim Sasser (D-TN) | January 3, 1977 | Tennessee 17th in population (1970) |
| 36 | 1707 | Dennis DeConcini (D-AZ) | January 3, 1977 | Arizona 22nd in population (1970) |
| 37 | 1708 | Orrin Hatch (R-UT) | January 3, 1977 | Utah 36th in population (1970) |
| 38 | 1710 | Malcolm Wallop (R-WY) | January 3, 1977 | Wyoming 49th in population (1970) |
| 39 | 1716 | David Durenberger (R-MN) | November 8, 1978 | |
| 40 | 1717 | Max Baucus (D-MT) | December 15, 1978 | |
| 41 | 1718 | Nancy Kassebaum Baker (R-KS) | December 23, 1978 | |
| 42 | 1719 | Thad Cochran (R-MS) | December 27, 1978 | |
| 43 | 1720 | Rudy Boschwitz (R-MN) | December 30, 1978 | |
| 44 | 1721 | Alan K. Simpson (R-WY) | January 1, 1979 | |
| 45 | 1722 | John Warner (R-VA) | January 2, 1979 | |
| 46 | 1723 | David Pryor (D-AR) | January 3, 1979 | Former representative (6 years, 2 months) |
| 47 | 1724 | William Cohen (R-ME) | January 3, 1979 | Former representative (6 years) |
| 48 | 1725 | William L. Armstrong (R-CO) | January 3, 1979 | Former representative (4 years) - Colorado 30th in population (1970) |
| 49 | 1727 | Larry Pressler (R-SD) | January 3, 1979 | Former representative (4 years) - South Dakota 44th in population (1970) |
| 50 | 1728 | David L. Boren (D-OK) | January 3, 1979 | Former governor - Oklahoma 27th in population (1970) |
| 51 | 1729 | J. James Exon (D-NE) | January 3, 1979 | Former governor - Nebraska 35th in population (1970) |
| 52 | 1730 | Carl Levin (D-MI) | January 3, 1979 | Michigan 7th in population (1970) |
| 53 | 1731 | Bill Bradley (D-NJ) | January 3, 1979 | New Jersey 8th in population (1970) |
| 54 | 1732 | Howell Heflin (D-AL) | January 3, 1979 | Alabama 21st in population (1970) |
| 55 | 1734 | Gordon J. Humphrey (R-NH) | January 3, 1979 | New Hampshire 41st in population (1970) |
| 56 | 1735 | George J. Mitchell (D-ME) | May 17, 1980 | |
| 57 | 1736 | Warren Rudman (R-NH) | December 31, 1980 | |
| 58 | 1740 | Steve Symms (R-ID) | January 3, 1981 | Former representative (12 years) |
| 59 | 1742 | Chris Dodd (D-CT) | January 3, 1981 | Former representative (6 years) - Connecticut 24th in population (1970) |
| 60 | 1743 | Chuck Grassley (R-IA) | January 3, 1981 | Former representative (6 years) - Iowa 25th in population (1970) |
| 61 | 1745 | Bob Kasten (R-WI) | January 3, 1981 | Former representative (4 years) |
| 62 | 1746 | Al D'Amato (R-NY) | January 3, 1981 | New York 2nd in population (1970) |
| 63 | 1747 | Arlen Specter (R-PA) | January 3, 1981 | Pennsylvania 3rd in population (1970) |
| 64 | 1748 | Alan J. Dixon (D-IL) | January 3, 1981 | Illinois 5th in population (1970) |
| 65 | 1752 | Don Nickles (R-OK) | January 3, 1981 | Oklahoma 27th in population (1970) |
| 66 | 1753 | Frank Murkowski (R-AK) | January 3, 1981 | Alaska 50th in population (1970) |
| 67 | 1755 | Frank Lautenberg (D-NJ) | December 27, 1982 | |
| 68 | 1757 | Pete Wilson (R-CA) | January 3, 1983 | California 1st in population (1980) |
| 69 | 1759 | Jeff Bingaman (D-NM) | January 3, 1983 | New Mexico 37th in population (1980) |
| 70 | 1761 | John Kerry (D-MA) | January 2, 1985 | |
| 71 | 1762 | Paul Simon (D-IL) | January 3, 1985 | Former representative (10 years) - Illinois 5th in population (1980) |
| 72 | 1763 | Tom Harkin (D-IA) | January 3, 1985 | Former representative (10 years) - Iowa 27th in population (1980) |
| 73 | 1764 | Al Gore (D-TN) | January 3, 1985 | Former representative (8 years) |
| 74 | 1765 | Phil Gramm (R-TX) | January 3, 1985 | Former representative (6 years) |
| 75 | 1766 | Mitch McConnell (R-KY) | January 3, 1985 | |
| 76 | 1767 | Jay Rockefeller (D-WV) | January 15, 1985 | |
| 77 | 1769 | Terry Sanford (D-NC) | November 5, 1986 | |
| 78 | 1770 | John Breaux (D-LA) | January 3, 1987 | Former representative (14 years) |
| 79 | 1771 | Brock Adams (D-WA) | January 3, 1987 | Former representative (12 years) - Former cabinet member |
| 80 | 1772 | Tim Wirth (D-CO) | January 3, 1987 | Former representative (12 years) |
| 81 | 1773 | Barbara Mikulski (D-MD) | January 3, 1987 | Former representative (10 years) |
| 82 | 1774 | Wyche Fowler (D-GA) | January 3, 1987 | Former representative (9 years, 9 months) |
| 83 | 1775 | Richard Shelby (D-AL) | January 3, 1987 | Former representative (8 years) - Alabama 22nd in population (1980) |
| 84 | 1776 | Tom Daschle (D-SD) | January 3, 1987 | Former representative (8 years) - South Dakota 45th in population (1980) |
| 85 | 1777 | John McCain (R-AZ) | January 3, 1987 | Former representative (4 years) - Arizona 29th in population (1980) |
| 86 | 1778 | Harry Reid (D-NV) | January 3, 1987 | Former representative (4 years) - Nevada 43rd in population (1980) |
| 87 | 1779 | Bob Graham (D-FL) | January 3, 1987 | Former governor - Florida 7th in population (1980) |
| 88 | 1780 | Kit Bond (R-MO) | January 3, 1987 | Former governor - Missouri 15th in population (1980) |
| 89 | 1781 | Kent Conrad (D-ND) | January 3, 1987 | |
| 90 | 1751 | Slade Gorton (R-WA) | January 3, 1989 | Previously a senator |
| 91 | 1783 | Trent Lott (R-MS) | January 3, 1989 | Former representative (16 years) |
| 92 | 1784 | Jim Jeffords (R-VT) | January 3, 1989 | Former representative (14 years) |
| 93 | 1785 | Dan Coats (R-IN) | January 3, 1989 | Former representative (8 years) |
| 94 | 1786 | Connie Mack (R-FL) | January 3, 1989 | Former representative (6 years) |
| 95 | 1787 | Richard Bryan (D-NV) | January 3, 1989 | Former governor (6 years) |
| 96 | 1788 | Chuck Robb (D-VA) | January 3, 1989 | Former governor (4 years) - Virginia 14th in population (1980) |
| 97 | 1789 | Bob Kerrey (D-NE) | January 3, 1989 | Former governor (4 years) - Nebraska 35th in population (1980) |
| 98 | 1790 | Herb Kohl (D-WI) | January 3, 1989 | Wisconsin 16th in population (1980) |
| 99 | 1791 | Joe Lieberman (I/D-CT) | January 3, 1989 | Connecticut 25th in population (1980) |
| 100 | 1792 | Conrad Burns (R-MT) | January 3, 1989 | Montana 44th in population (1980) |
| | 1793 | Daniel Akaka (D-HI) | May 16, 1990 | |
| | 1794 | Bob Smith (R-NH) | December 7, 1990 | |

The most senior senators by class were Robert Byrd (D-West Virginia) from Class 1, Strom Thurmond (R-South Carolina) from Class 2, and Daniel Inouye (D-Hawaii) from Class 3.

== See also ==
- 101st United States Congress
- List of United States representatives in the 101st Congress
