= List of United States representatives in the 102nd Congress =

This is a complete list of United States representatives during the 102nd United States Congress listed by seniority.

As an historical article, the districts and party affiliations listed reflect those during the 102nd Congress (January 3, 1991 – January 3, 1993). Seats and party affiliations on similar lists for other congresses will be different for certain members.

Seniority depends on the date on which members were sworn into office. Since many members are sworn in on the same day, subsequent ranking is based on previous congressional service of the individual and then by alphabetical order by the last name of the representative.

Committee chairmanship in the House is often associated with seniority. However, party leadership is typically not associated with seniority.

Note: The "*" indicates that the representative/delegate may have served one or more non-consecutive terms while in the House of Representatives of the United States Congress.

== U.S. House seniority list ==
U.S. House seniority
Rank	Representative	Party	District	Seniority date (Previous service, if any)	No.# of term(s)	Notes
1	Jamie Whitten	D	MS-01	November 4, 1941	26th term	Dean of the House
2	Charles Edward Bennett	D	FL-03	January 3, 1949	22nd term	Left the House in 1993.
3	Jack Brooks	D	TX-09	January 3, 1953	20th term	
4	William Natcher	D	KY-02	August 1, 1953	20th term	
5	Dante Fascell	D	FL-19	January 3, 1955	19th term	Left the House in 1993.
6	John Dingell	D	MI-16	December 13, 1955	19th term	
7	William Broomfield	R	MI-18	January 3, 1957	18th term	Left the House in 1993.
8	Robert Michel	R	IL-18	January 3, 1957	18th term	
9	Silvio O. Conte	R	MA-01	January 3, 1959	17th term	Died on February 8, 1991.
10	Dan Rostenkowski	D	IL-08	January 3, 1959	17th term	
11	Neal Smith	D	IA-04	January 3, 1959	17th term	
12	Mo Udall	D	AZ-02	May 2, 1961	16th term	Resigned on May 4, 1991.
13	Henry B. González	D	TX-20	November 4, 1961	16th term	
14	Don Edwards	D	CA-10	January 3, 1963	15th term	
15	Sam Gibbons	D	FL-07	January 3, 1963	15th term	
16	Frank Horton	R	NY-29	January 3, 1963	15th term	Left the House in 1993.
17	Joseph McDade	R	PA-10	January 3, 1963	15th term	
18	Jimmy Quillen	R	TN-01	January 3, 1963	15th term	
19	Edward R. Roybal	D	CA-25	January 3, 1963	15th term	Left the House in 1993.
20	J. J. Pickle	D	TX-10	December 21, 1963	15th term	
21	Sidney Yates	D	IL-09	January 3, 1965; Previous service, 1949–1963.	21st term*	
22	Frank Annunzio	D	IL-11	January 3, 1965	14th term	Left the House in 1993.
23	John Conyers	D	MI-01	January 3, 1965	14th term	
24	Bill Dickinson	R	AL-02	January 3, 1965	14th term	Left the House in 1993.
25	Tom Foley	D	WA-05	January 3, 1965	14th term	Speaker of the House
26	William Ford	D	MI-15	January 3, 1965	14th term	
27	Kika De la Garza	D	TX-15	January 3, 1965	14th term	
28	Lee Hamilton	D	IN-09	January 3, 1965	14th term	
29	Walter B. Jones Sr.	D	NC-01	February 5, 1966	14th term	Died on September 15, 1992.
30	Guy Vander Jagt	R	MI-09	November 8, 1966	14th term	Left the House in 1993.
31	Tom Bevill	D	AL-04	January 3, 1967	13th term	
32	John Paul Hammerschmidt	R	AR-03	January 3, 1967	13th term	Left the House in 1993.
33	Clarence E. Miller	R	OH-10	January 3, 1967	13th term	Left the House in 1993.
34	Sonny Montgomery	D	MS-03	January 3, 1967	13th term	
35	John Myers	R	IN-07	January 3, 1967	13th term	
36	Chalmers Wylie	R	OH-15	January 3, 1967	13th term	Left the House in 1993.
37	Joseph M. Gaydos	D	PA-20	November 5, 1968	13th term	Left the House in 1993.
38	Bill Alexander	D	AR-01	January 3, 1969	12th term	Left the House in 1993.
39	Glenn M. Anderson	D	CA-32	January 3, 1969	12th term	Left the House in 1993.
40	Bill Clay	D	MO-01	January 3, 1969	12th term	
41	Lawrence Coughlin	R	PA-13	January 3, 1969	12th term	Left the House in 1993.
42	Hamilton Fish	R	NY-21	January 3, 1969	12th term	
43	Louis Stokes	D	OH-21	January 3, 1969	12th term	
44	Gus Yatron	D	PA-06	January 3, 1969	12th term	Left the House in 1993.
45	Dave Obey	D	WI-07	April 1, 1969	12th term	
46	Robert A. Roe	D	NJ-08	November 4, 1969	12th term	Left the House in 1993.
47	Phil Crane	R	IL-12	November 25, 1969	12th term	
48	Les Aspin	D	WI-01	January 3, 1971	11th term	
49	Bill Archer	R	TX-07	January 3, 1971	11th term	
50	Ron Dellums	D	CA-08	January 3, 1971	11th term	
51	Norman F. Lent	R	NY-04	January 3, 1971	11th term	Left the House in 1993.
52	Romano Mazzoli	D	KY-03	January 3, 1971	11th term	
53	Charles B. Rangel	D	NY-16	January 3, 1971	11th term	
54	Floyd Spence	R	SC-02	January 3, 1971	11th term	
55	Bill Young	R	FL-08	January 3, 1971	11th term	
56	George Brown Jr.	D	CA-36	January 3, 1973; Previous service, 1963–1971.	14th term*	
57	Benjamin A. Gilman	R	NY-22	January 3, 1973	10th term	
58	William Lehman	D	FL-17	January 3, 1973	10th term	Left the House in 1993.
59	Edward Rell Madigan	R	IL-15	January 3, 1973	10th term	Resigned on March 8, 1991.
60	Joe Moakley	D	MA-09	January 3, 1973	10th term	
61	Carlos Moorhead	R	CA-22	January 3, 1973	10th term	
62	Ralph Regula	R	OH-16	January 3, 1973	10th term	
63	Matthew John Rinaldo	R	NJ-07	January 3, 1973	10th term	Left the House in 1993.
64	Charlie Rose	D	NC-07	January 3, 1973	10th term	
65	Patricia Schroeder	D	CO-01	January 3, 1973	10th term	
66	Bud Shuster	R	PA-09	January 3, 1973	10th term	
67	Pete Stark	D	CA-09	January 3, 1973	10th term	
68	Gerry Studds	D	MA-10	January 3, 1973	10th term	
69	Charles Wilson	D	TX-02	January 3, 1973	10th term	
70	Don Young	R	AK	March 6, 1973	10th term	
71	Cardiss Collins	D	IL-07	June 5, 1973	10th term	
72	John Murtha	D	PA-12	February 5, 1974	10th term	
73	Robert J. Lagomarsino	R	CA-19	March 5, 1974	10th term	Left the House in 1993.
74	J. Bob Traxler	D	MI-08	April 23, 1974	10th term	Left the House in 1993.
75	Les AuCoin	D	OR-01	January 3, 1975	9th term	Left the House in 1993.
76	Butler Derrick	D	SC-03	January 3, 1975	9th term	
77	Thomas Downey	D	NY-02	January 3, 1975	9th term	Left the House in 1993.
78	Joseph D. Early	D	MA-03	January 3, 1975	9th term	Left the House in 1993.
79	Glenn English	D	OK-06	January 3, 1975	9th term	
80	Harold Ford	D	TN-09	January 3, 1975	9th term	
81	Bill Goodling	R	PA-19	January 3, 1975	9th term	
82	Bill Gradison	R	OH-02	January 3, 1975	9th term	
83	Bill Hefner	D	NC-08	January 3, 1975	9th term	
84	Carroll Hubbard	D	KY-01	January 3, 1975	9th term	Left the House in 1993.
85	William Hughes	D	NJ-02	January 3, 1975	9th term	
86	Henry Hyde	R	IL-06	January 3, 1975	9th term	
87	Andrew Jacobs Jr.	D	IN-10	January 3, 1975; Previous service, 1965–1973.	13th term*	
88	Matthew F. McHugh	D	NY-28	January 3, 1975	9th term	Left the House in 1993.
89	John LaFalce	D	NY-32	January 3, 1975	9th term	
90	Marilyn Lloyd	D	TN-03	January 3, 1975	9th term	
91	George Miller	D	CA-07	January 3, 1975	9th term	
92	Norman Mineta	D	CA-13	January 3, 1975	9th term	
93	Stephen Neal	D	NC-05	January 3, 1975	9th term	
94	Henry J. Nowak	D	NY-33	January 3, 1975	9th term	Left the House in 1993.
95	Jim Oberstar	D	MN-08	January 3, 1975	9th term	
96	Marty Russo	D	IL-03	January 3, 1975	9th term	Left the House in 1993.
97	James H. Scheuer	D	NY-08	January 3, 1975; Previous service, 1965–1973.	13th term*	Left the House in 1993.
98	Richard T. Schulze	R	PA-05	January 3, 1975	9th term	Left the House in 1993.
99	Philip Sharp	D	IN-02	January 3, 1975	9th term	
100	Stephen J. Solarz	D	NY-13	January 3, 1975	9th term	Left the House in 1993.
101	Henry Waxman	D	CA-24	January 3, 1975	9th term	
102	Earl Thomas Coleman	R	MO-06	November 2, 1976	9th term	Left the House in 1993.
103	Ed Markey	D	MA-07	November 2, 1976	9th term	
104	Douglas Applegate	D	OH-18	January 3, 1977	8th term	
105	Doug Barnard Jr.	D	GA-10	January 3, 1977	8th term	Left the House in 1993.
106	Anthony C. Beilenson	D	CA-23	January 3, 1977	8th term	
107	David Bonior	D	MI-12	January 3, 1977	8th term	
108	Norm Dicks	D	WA-06	January 3, 1977	8th term	
109	Mickey Edwards	R	OK-05	January 3, 1977	8th term	Left the House in 1993.
110	Dick Gephardt	D	MO-03	January 3, 1977	8th term	
111	Dan Glickman	D	KS-04	January 3, 1977	8th term	
112	Jerry Huckaby	D	LA-05	January 3, 1977	8th term	Left the House in 1993.
113	Andy Ireland	R	FL-10	January 3, 1977	8th term	Left the House in 1993.
114	Ed Jenkins	D	GA-09	January 3, 1977	8th term	Left the House in 1993.
115	Dale Kildee	D	MI-07	January 3, 1977	8th term	
116	Jim Leach	R	IA-01	January 3, 1977	8th term	
117	Ron Marlenee	R	MT-02	January 3, 1977	8th term	Left the House in 1993.
118	Austin Murphy	D	PA-22	January 3, 1977	8th term	
119	Mary Rose Oakar	D	OH-20	January 3, 1977	8th term	Left the House in 1993.
120	Leon Panetta	D	CA-16	January 3, 1977	8th term	
121	Donald J. Pease	D	OH-13	January 3, 1977	8th term	Left the House in 1993.
122	Carl Pursell	R	MI-02	January 3, 1977	8th term	Left the House in 1993.
123	Nick Rahall	D	WV-04	January 3, 1977	8th term	
124	Ike Skelton	D	MO-04	January 3, 1977	8th term	
125	Bob Stump	R	AZ-03	January 3, 1977	8th term	
126	Bruce Vento	D	MN-04	January 3, 1977	8th term	
127	Harold Volkmer	D	MO-09	January 3, 1977	8th term	
128	Robert Walker	R	PA-16	January 3, 1977	8th term	
129	Theodore S. Weiss	D	NY-17	January 3, 1977	8th term	Died on September 14, 1992.
130	Bob Livingston	R	LA-01	August 27, 1977	8th term	
131	S. William Green	R	NY-15	February 14, 1978	8th term	Left the House in 1993.
132	Beryl Anthony Jr.	D	AR-04	January 3, 1979	7th term	Left the House in 1993.
133	Doug Bereuter	R	NE-01	January 3, 1979	7th term	
134	Beverly Byron	D	MD-06	January 3, 1979	7th term	Left the House in 1993.
135	Bill Clinger	R	PA-23	January 3, 1979	7th term	
136	William E. Dannemeyer	R	CA-39	January 3, 1979	7th term	Left the House in 1993.
137	Robert William Davis	R	MI-11	January 3, 1979	7th term	Left the House in 1993.
138	Julian C. Dixon	D	CA-28	January 3, 1979	7th term	
139	Brian J. Donnelly	D	MA-11	January 3, 1979	7th term	Left the House in 1993.
140	Vic Fazio	D	CA-04	January 3, 1979	7th term	
141	Martin Frost	D	TX-24	January 3, 1979	7th term	
142	Newt Gingrich	R	GA-06	January 3, 1979	7th term	
143	William H. Gray	D	PA-02	January 3, 1979	7th term	Resigned on September 11, 1991.
144	Frank Joseph Guarini	D	NJ-14	January 3, 1979	7th term	Left the House in 1993.
145	Tony Hall	D	OH-03	January 3, 1979	7th term	
146	Larry J. Hopkins	R	KY-06	January 3, 1979	7th term	Left the House in 1993.
147	Earl Dewitt Hutto	D	FL-01	January 3, 1979	7th term	Left the House in 1993.
148	Jerry Lewis	R	CA-35	January 3, 1979	7th term	
149	Bob Matsui	D	CA-03	January 3, 1979	7th term	
150	Nicholas Mavroules	D	MA-06	January 3, 1979	7th term	Left the House in 1993.
151	Donald L. Ritter	R	PA-15	January 3, 1979	7th term	Left the House in 1993.
152	Toby Roth	R	WI-08	January 3, 1979	7th term	
153	Martin Olav Sabo	D	MN-05	January 3, 1979	7th term	
154	James Sensenbrenner	R	WI-09	January 3, 1979	7th term	
155	Olympia Snowe	R	ME-02	January 3, 1979	7th term	
156	Gerald Solomon	R	NY-24	January 3, 1979	7th term	
157	Charles Stenholm	D	TX-17	January 3, 1979	7th term	
158	Al Swift	D	WA-02	January 3, 1979	7th term	
159	Mike Synar	D	OK-02	January 3, 1979	7th term	
160	Bill Thomas	R	CA-20	January 3, 1979	7th term	
161	Pat Williams	D	MT-01	January 3, 1979	7th term	
162	Howard Wolpe	D	MI-03	January 3, 1979	7th term	Left the House in 1993.
163	Tom Petri	R	WI-06	April 3, 1979	7th term	
164	John Porter	R	IL-10	January 22, 1980	7th term	
165	Billy Tauzin	D	LA-03	May 22, 1980	7th term	
166	Thomas Bliley	R	VA-03	January 3, 1981	6th term	
167	William Coyne	D	PA-14	January 3, 1981	6th term	
168	David Dreier	R	CA-33	January 3, 1981	6th term	
169	Byron Dorgan	D	ND	January 3, 1981	6th term	Resigned on December 14, 1992.
170	Bernard J. Dwyer	D	NJ-06	January 3, 1981	6th term	Left the House in 1993.
171	Mervyn M. Dymally	D	CA-31	January 3, 1981	6th term	Left the House in 1993.
172	Dennis E. Eckart	D	OH-11	January 3, 1981	6th term	Left the House in 1993.
173	Bill Emerson	R	MO-08	January 3, 1981	6th term	
174	Jack Fields	R	TX-08	January 3, 1981	6th term	
175	Tom Foglietta	D	PA-01	January 3, 1981	6th term	
176	Barney Frank	D	MA-04	January 3, 1981	6th term	
177	Sam Gejdenson	D	CT-02	January 3, 1981	6th term	
178	Steve Gunderson	R	WI-03	January 3, 1981	6th term	
179	Ralph Hall	D	TX-04	January 3, 1981	6th term	
180	James Hansen	R	UT-01	January 3, 1981	6th term	
181	Charles Floyd Hatcher	D	GA-02	January 3, 1981	6th term	Left the House in 1993.
182	Dennis M. Hertel	D	MI-14	January 3, 1981	6th term	Left the House in 1993.
183	Duncan Hunter	R	CA-45	January 3, 1981	6th term	
184	Tom Lantos	D	CA-11	January 3, 1981	6th term	
185	Bill Lowery	R	CA-41	January 3, 1981	6th term	Left the House in 1993.
186	David O'Brien Martin	R	NY-26	January 3, 1981	6th term	Left the House in 1993.
187	Bill McCollum	R	FL-05	January 3, 1981	6th term	
188	Dave McCurdy	D	OK-04	January 3, 1981	6th term	
189	Bob McEwen	R	OH-06	January 3, 1981	6th term	Left the House in 1993.
190	Raymond J. McGrath	R	NY-05	January 3, 1981	6th term	Left the House in 1993.
191	Sid Morrison	R	WA-04	January 3, 1981	6th term	Left the House in 1993.
192	Pat Roberts	R	KS-01	January 3, 1981	6th term	
193	Hal Rogers	R	KY-05	January 3, 1981	6th term	
194	Marge Roukema	R	NJ-05	January 3, 1981	6th term	
195	Gus Savage	D	IL-02	January 3, 1981	6th term	Left the House in 1993.
196	Chuck Schumer	D	NY-10	January 3, 1981	6th term	
197	E. Clay Shaw Jr.	R	FL-15	January 3, 1981	6th term	
198	Joe Skeen	R	NM-02	January 3, 1981	6th term	
199	Christopher Smith	R	NJ-04	January 3, 1981	6th term	
200	Vin Weber	R	MN-02	January 3, 1981	6th term	Left the House in 1993.
201	Frank Wolf	R	VA-10	January 3, 1981	6th term	
202	Ron Wyden	D	OR-03	January 3, 1981	6th term	
203	Steny H. Hoyer	D	MD-05	May 19, 1981	6th term	
204	Mike Oxley	R	OH-04	June 25, 1981	6th term	
205	Barbara B. Kennelly	D	CT-01	January 12, 1982	6th term	
206	Matthew G. Martínez	D	CA-30	July 13, 1982	6th term	
207	Michael Andrews	D	TX-25	January 3, 1983	5th term	
208	Steve Bartlett	R	TX-03	January 3, 1983	5th term	Resigned on March 11, 1991.
209	Herbert Bateman	R	VA-01	January 3, 1983	5th term	
210	Howard Berman	D	CA-26	January 3, 1983	5th term	
211	Michael Bilirakis	R	FL-09	January 3, 1983	5th term	
212	Sherwood Boehlert	R	NY-25	January 3, 1983	5th term	
213	Robert A. Borski Jr.	D	PA-03	January 3, 1983	5th term	
214	Rick Boucher	D	VA-09	January 3, 1983	5th term	
215	Barbara Boxer	D	CA-06	January 3, 1983	5th term	Left the House in 1993.
216	John Bryant	D	TX-05	January 3, 1983	5th term	
217	Dan Burton	R	IN-06	January 3, 1983	5th term	
218	Thomas Carper	D	DE	January 3, 1983	5th term	Left the House in 1993.
219	Bob Carr	D	MI-06	January 3, 1983; Previous service, 1975–1981.	8th term*	
220	Rod Chandler	R	WA-08	January 3, 1983	5th term	Left the House in 1993.
221	Ron Coleman	D	TX-16	January 3, 1983	5th term	
222	Jim Cooper	D	TN-04	January 3, 1983	5th term	
223	Richard Durbin	D	IL-20	January 3, 1983	5th term	
224	Ben Erdreich	D	AL-06	January 3, 1983	5th term	Left the House in 1993.
225	Lane Evans	D	IL-17	January 3, 1983	5th term	
226	Ed Feighan	D	OH-19	January 3, 1983	5th term	Left the House in 1993.
227	George Gekas	R	PA-17	January 3, 1983	5th term	
228	Nancy Johnson	R	CT-06	January 3, 1983	5th term	
229	Marcy Kaptur	D	OH-09	January 3, 1983	5th term	
230	John Kasich	R	OH-12	January 3, 1983	5th term	
231	Joseph P. Kolter	D	PA-04	January 3, 1983	5th term	Left the House in 1993.
232	Peter H. Kostmayer	D	PA-08	January 3, 1983; Previous service, 1977–1981.	7th term*	Left the House in 1993.
233	Richard H. Lehman	D	CA-18	January 3, 1983	5th term	
234	Sander Levin	D	MI-17	January 3, 1983	5th term	
235	Mel Levine	D	CA-27	January 3, 1983	5th term	Left the House in 1993.
236	Tom Lewis	R	FL-12	January 3, 1983	5th term	
237	Bill Lipinski	D	IL-05	January 3, 1983	5th term	
238	Al McCandless	R	CA-37	January 3, 1983	5th term	
239	Alan Mollohan	D	WV-01	January 3, 1983	5th term	
240	Jim Moody	D	WI-05	January 3, 1983	5th term	Left the House in 1993.
241	Robert J. Mrazek	D	NY-03	January 3, 1983	5th term	Left the House in 1993.
242	Ron Packard	R	CA-43	January 3, 1983	5th term	
243	Jim Olin	D	VA-06	January 3, 1983	5th term	Left the House in 1993.
244	Solomon Ortiz	D	TX-27	January 3, 1983	5th term	
245	Major Owens	D	NY-12	January 3, 1983	5th term	
246	Tim Penny	D	MN-01	January 3, 1983	5th term	
247	Richard Ray	D	GA-03	January 3, 1983	5th term	Left the House in 1993.
248	Bill Richardson	D	NM-03	January 3, 1983	5th term	
249	Tom Ridge	R	PA-21	January 3, 1983	5th term	
250	James Rowland	D	GA-08	January 3, 1983	5th term	
251	Gerry Sikorski	D	MN-06	January 3, 1983	5th term	Left the House in 1993.
252	Norman Sisisky	D	VA-04	January 3, 1983	5th term	
253	Jim Slattery	D	KS-02	January 3, 1983	5th term	
254	Lawrence J. Smith	D	FL-16	January 3, 1983	5th term	Left the House in 1993.
255	Robert Smith	R	OR-02	January 3, 1983	5th term	
256	John Spratt	D	SC-05	January 3, 1983	5th term	
257	Harley O. Staggers Jr.	D	WV-02	January 3, 1983	5th term	Left the House in 1993.
258	Don Sundquist	R	TN-07	January 3, 1983	5th term	
259	Robin Tallon	D	SC-06	January 3, 1983	5th term	Left the House in 1993.
260	Lindsay Thomas	D	GA-01	January 3, 1983	5th term	Left the House in 1993.
261	Esteban Edward Torres	D	CA-34	January 3, 1983	5th term	
262	Robert Torricelli	D	NJ-09	January 3, 1983	5th term	
263	Ed Towns	D	NY-11	January 3, 1983	5th term	
264	Tim Valentine	D	NC-02	January 3, 1983	5th term	
265	Barbara Vucanovich	R	NV-02	January 3, 1983	5th term	
266	Alan Wheat	D	MO-05	January 3, 1983	5th term	
267	Bob Wise	D	WV-03	January 3, 1983	5th term	
268	Gary Ackerman	D	NY-07	March 1, 1983	5th term	
269	Daniel Schaefer	R	CO-06	March 29, 1983	5th term	
270	Charles Hayes	D	IL-01	August 23, 1983	5th term	Left the House in 1993.
271	George Darden	D	GA-07	November 8, 1983	5th term	
272	Jerry Kleczka	D	WI-04	April 3, 1984	5th term	
273	Carl C. Perkins	D	KY-07	November 6, 1984	5th term	Left the House in 1993.
274	Jim Saxton	R	NJ-13	November 6, 1984	5th term	
275	Dick Armey	R	TX-26	January 3, 1985	4th term	
276	Chester G. Atkins	D	MA-05	January 3, 1985	4th term	Left the House in 1993.
277	Joe Barton	R	TX-06	January 3, 1985	4th term	
278	Helen Bentley	R	MD-02	January 3, 1985	4th term	
279	Terry L. Bruce	D	IL-19	January 3, 1985	4th term	Left the House in 1993.
280	Albert Bustamante	D	TX-23	January 3, 1985	4th term	Left the House in 1993.
281	Sonny Callahan	R	AL-01	January 3, 1985	4th term	
282	Howard Coble	R	NC-06	January 3, 1985	4th term	
283	Larry Combest	R	TX-19	January 3, 1985	4th term	
284	Tom DeLay	R	TX-22	January 3, 1985	4th term	
285	Bob Dornan	R	CA-38	January 3, 1985; Previous service, 1977–1983.	7th term*	
286	Harris Fawell	R	IL-13	January 3, 1985	4th term	
287	Dean Gallo	R	NJ-11	January 3, 1985	4th term	
288	Bart Gordon	D	TN-06	January 3, 1985	4th term	
289	Paul Henry	R	MI-05	January 3, 1985	4th term	
290	Paul Kanjorski	D	PA-11	January 3, 1985	4th term	
291	Jim Kolbe	R	AZ-05	January 3, 1985	4th term	
292	Jim Lightfoot	R	IA-05	January 3, 1985	4th term	
293	Thomas J. Manton	D	NY-09	January 3, 1985	4th term	
294	Alex McMillan	R	NC-09	January 3, 1985	4th term	
295	Jan Meyers	R	KS-03	January 3, 1985	4th term	
296	John Miller	R	WA-01	January 3, 1985	4th term	Left the House in 1993.
297	D. French Slaughter Jr.	R	VA-07	January 3, 1985	4th term	Resigned on November 5, 1991.
298	Richard H. Stallings	D	ID-02	January 3, 1985	4th term	Left the House in 1993.
299	James Traficant	D	OH-17	January 3, 1985	4th term	
300	Peter Visclosky	D	IN-01	January 3, 1985	4th term	
301	Frank McCloskey	D	IN-08	May 1, 1985; Previous service, 1983–1985.	5th term*	
302	Jim Chapman	D	TX-01	August 3, 1985	4th term	
303	Cass Ballenger	R	NC-10	November 4, 1986	4th term	
304	Richard Baker	R	LA-06	January 3, 1987	3rd term	
305	James Bilbray	D	NV-01	January 3, 1987	3rd term	
306	Jim Bunning	R	KY-04	January 3, 1987	3rd term	
307	Ben Nighthorse Campbell	D	CO-03	January 3, 1987	3rd term	Left the House in 1993.
308	Ben Cardin	D	MD-03	January 3, 1987	3rd term	
309	Peter DeFazio	D	OR-04	January 3, 1987	3rd term	
310	Mike Espy	D	MS-02	January 3, 1987	3rd term	
311	Floyd Flake	D	NY-06	January 3, 1987	3rd term	
312	Elton Gallegly	R	CA-21	January 3, 1987	3rd term	
313	Fred Grandy	R	IA-06	January 3, 1987	3rd term	
314	Claude Harris Jr.	D	AL-07	January 3, 1987	3rd term	Left the House in 1993.
315	Dennis Hastert	R	IL-14	January 3, 1987	3rd term	
316	Jimmy Hayes	D	LA-07	January 3, 1987	3rd term	
317	Joel Hefley	R	CO-05	January 3, 1987	3rd term	
318	Wally Herger	R	CA-02	January 3, 1987	3rd term	
319	George Hochbrueckner	D	NY-01	January 3, 1987	3rd term	
320	Clyde C. Holloway	R	LA-08	January 3, 1987	3rd term	Left the House in 1993.
321	Amo Houghton	R	NY-34	January 3, 1987	3rd term	
322	Jim Inhofe	R	OK-01	January 3, 1987	3rd term	
323	Tim Johnson	D	SD	January 3, 1987	3rd term	
324	Jim Jontz	D	IN-05	January 3, 1987	3rd term	Left the House in 1993.
325	Joseph Kennedy II	D	MA-08	January 3, 1987	3rd term	
326	Jon Kyl	R	AZ-04	January 3, 1987	3rd term	
327	Martin Lancaster	D	NC-03	January 3, 1987	3rd term	
328	John Lewis	D	GA-05	January 3, 1987	3rd term	
329	Charles Thomas McMillen	D	MD-04	January 3, 1987	3rd term	Left the House in 1993.
330	Kweisi Mfume	D	MD-07	January 3, 1987	3rd term	
331	Connie Morella	R	MD-08	January 3, 1987	3rd term	
332	David R. Nagle	D	IA-03	January 3, 1987	3rd term	Left the House in 1993.
333	Wayne Owens	D	UT-02	January 3, 1987; Previous service, 1973–1975.	4th term*	Left the House in 1993.
334	Liz J. Patterson	D	SC-04	January 3, 1987	3rd term	Left the House in 1993.
335	David Price	D	NC-04	January 3, 1987	3rd term	
336	Owen Pickett	D	VA-02	January 3, 1987	3rd term	
337	Arthur Ravenel	R	SC-01	January 3, 1987	3rd term	
338	John J. Rhodes III	R	AZ-01	January 3, 1987	3rd term	Left the House in 1993.
339	Thomas Sawyer	D	OH-14	January 3, 1987	3rd term	
340	David Skaggs	D	CO-02	January 3, 1987	3rd term	
341	Louise Slaughter	D	NY-30	January 3, 1987	3rd term	
342	Lamar Smith	R	TX-21	January 3, 1987	3rd term	
343	Fred Upton	R	MI-04	January 3, 1987	3rd term	
344	Curt Weldon	R	PA-07	January 3, 1987	3rd term	
345	Nancy Pelosi	D	CA-05	June 2, 1987	3rd term	
346	Chris Shays	R	CT-04	August 18, 1987	3rd term	
347	Bob Clement	D	TN-05	January 19, 1988	3rd term	
348	Jim McCrery	R	LA-04	April 16, 1988	3rd term	
349	Lewis Payne	D	VA-05	June 14, 1988	3rd term	
350	Jerry Costello	D	IL-21	August 9, 1988	3rd term	
351	Jimmy Duncan	R	TN-02	November 8, 1988	3rd term	
352	Frank Pallone	D	NJ-03	November 8, 1988	3rd term	
353	Tom Campbell	R	CA-12	January 3, 1989	2nd term	Left the House in 1993.
354	Christopher Cox	R	CA-40	January 3, 1989	2nd term	
355	Eliot Engel	D	NY-19	January 3, 1989	2nd term	
356	Paul Gillmor	R	OH-05	January 3, 1989	2nd term	
357	Porter Goss	R	FL-13	January 3, 1989	2nd term	
358	Mel Hancock	R	MO-07	January 3, 1989	2nd term	
359	Peter Hoagland	D	NE-02	January 3, 1989	2nd term	
360	Craig James	R	FL-04	January 3, 1989	2nd term	Left the House in 1993.
361	Harry A. Johnston	D	FL-14	January 3, 1989	2nd term	Left the House in 1993.
362	Ben Jones	D	GA-04	January 3, 1989	2nd term	Left the House in 1993.
363	Greg Laughlin	D	TX-14	January 3, 1989	2nd term	
364	Nita Lowey	D	NY-20	January 3, 1989	2nd term	
365	Ronald Machtley	R	RI-01	January 3, 1989	2nd term	
366	Jim McDermott	D	WA-07	January 3, 1989	2nd term	
367	Mike McNulty	D	NY-23	January 3, 1989	2nd term	
368	Richard Neal	D	MA-02	January 3, 1989	2nd term	
369	Mike Parker	D	MS-04	January 3, 1989	2nd term	
370	Bill Paxon	R	NY-31	January 3, 1989	2nd term	
371	Donald Payne	D	NJ-10	January 3, 1989	2nd term	
372	Glenn Poshard	D	IL-22	January 3, 1989	2nd term	
373	Dana Rohrabacher	R	CA-42	January 3, 1989	2nd term	
374	George E. Sangmeister	D	IL-04	January 3, 1989	2nd term	
375	Bill Sarpalius	D	TX-13	January 3, 1989	2nd term	
376	Steven Schiff	R	NM-01	January 3, 1989	2nd term	
377	Cliff Stearns	R	FL-06	January 3, 1989	2nd term	
378	John Tanner	D	TN-08	January 3, 1989	2nd term	
379	Jolene Unsoeld	D	WA-03	January 3, 1989	2nd term	
380	James Walsh	R	NY-27	January 3, 1989	2nd term	
381	Jill Long	D	IN-04	March 28, 1989	2nd term	
382	Glen Browder	D	AL-03	April 4, 1989	2nd term	
383	Craig Thomas	R	WY	April 26, 1989	2nd term	
384	Ileana Ros-Lehtinen	R	FL-18	August 29, 1989	2nd term	
385	Gary Condit	D	CA-15	September 12, 1989	2nd term	
386	Pete Geren	D	TX-12	September 12, 1989	2nd term	
387	Gene Taylor	D	MS-05	October 17, 1989	2nd term	
388	Craig Washington	D	TX-18	December 9, 1989	2nd term	
389	Susan Molinari	R	NY-14	March 20, 1990	2nd term	
390	José Serrano	D	NY-18	March 21, 1990	2nd term	
391	Patsy Mink	D	HI-02	September 22, 1990; Previous service, 1965–1977.	8th term*	
392	Rob Andrews	D	NJ-01	November 6, 1990	2nd term	
393	Neil Abercrombie	D	HI-01	January 3, 1991; Previous service, 1986–1987.	2nd term*	
394	Wayne Allard	R	CO-04	January 3, 1991	1st term	
395	Thomas Andrews	D	ME-01	January 3, 1991	1st term	
396	Jim Bacchus	D	FL-11	January 3, 1991	1st term	
397	Bill Barrett	R	NE-03	January 3, 1991	1st term	
398	John Boehner	R	OH-08	January 3, 1991	1st term	
399	William K. Brewster	D	OK-03	January 3, 1991	1st term	
400	Dave Camp	R	MI-10	January 3, 1991	1st term	
401	Barbara-Rose Collins	D	MI-13	January 3, 1991	1st term	
402	John W. Cox Jr.	D	IL-16	January 3, 1991	1st term	Left the House in 1993.
403	Bud Cramer	D	AL-05	January 3, 1991	1st term	
404	Duke Cunningham	R	CA-44	January 3, 1991	1st term	
405	Rosa DeLauro	D	CT-03	January 3, 1991	1st term	
406	John Doolittle	R	CA-14	January 3, 1991	1st term	
407	Cal Dooley	D	CA-17	January 3, 1991	1st term	
408	Chet Edwards	D	TX-11	January 3, 1991	1st term	
409	Gary Franks	R	CT-05	January 3, 1991	1st term	
410	Wayne Gilchrest	R	MD-01	January 3, 1991	1st term	
411	Dave Hobson	R	OH-07	January 3, 1991	1st term	
412	Joan Kelly Horn	D	MO-02	January 3, 1991	1st term	Left the House in 1993.
413	William Jefferson	D	LA-02	January 3, 1991	1st term	
414	Scott L. Klug	R	WI-02	January 3, 1991	1st term	
415	Michael J. Kopetski	D	OR-05	January 3, 1991	1st term	
416	Larry LaRocco	D	ID-01	January 3, 1991	1st term	
417	Charlie Luken	D	OH-01	January 3, 1991	1st term	Left the House in 1993.
418	Jim Moran	D	VA-08	January 3, 1991	1st term	
419	Dick Nichols	R	KS-05	January 3, 1991	1st term	Left the House in 1993.
420	Jim Nussle	R	IA-02	January 3, 1991	1st term	
421	Bill Orton	D	UT-03	January 3, 1991	1st term	
422	Collin Peterson	D	MN-07	January 3, 1991	1st term	
423	Pete Peterson	D	FL-02	January 3, 1991	1st term	
424	Jim Ramstad	R	MN-03	January 3, 1991	1st term	
425	Jack Reed	D	RI-02	January 3, 1991	1st term	
426	Frank Riggs	R	CA-01	January 3, 1991	1st term	Left the House in 1993.
427	Timothy Roemer	D	IN-03	January 3, 1991	1st term	
428	Bernie Sanders	I	VT	January 3, 1991	1st term	
429	Rick Santorum	R	PA-18	January 3, 1991	1st term	
430	Richard Swett	D	NH-02	January 3, 1991	1st term	
431	Charles H. Taylor	R	NC-11	January 3, 1991	1st term	
432	Ray Thornton	D	AR-02	January 3, 1991; Previous service, 1973–1979.	4th term*	
433	Maxine Waters	D	CA-29	January 3, 1991	1st term	
434	Bill Zeliff	R	NH-01	January 3, 1991	1st term	
435	Dick Zimmer	R	NJ-12	January 3, 1991	1st term	
	Sam Johnson	R	TX-03	May 8, 1991	1st term	
	John Olver	D	MA-01	June 18, 1991	1st term	
	Thomas W. Ewing	R	IL-15	July 2, 1991	1st term	
	Ed Pastor	D	AZ-02	October 3, 1991	1st term	
	George F. Allen	R	VA-07	November 5, 1991	1st term	Left the House in 1993.
	Lucien E. Blackwell	D	PA-02	November 5, 1991	1st term	
	Eva M. Clayton	D	NC-01	November 3, 1992	1st term	
	Jerrold Nadler	D	NY-17	November 3, 1992	1st term	

== Delegates ==
Rank	Delegate	Party	District	Seniority date (Previous service, if any)	No.# of term(s)	Notes
1	Ron de Lugo	D	VI	January 3, 1981; Previous service, 1973–1979.	9th term*	
2	Jaime Fuster	D	PR	January 3, 1985	4th term	
3	Vicente T. Blaz	R	GU	January 3, 1985	4th term	
4	Eni Faleomavaega	D	AS	January 3, 1989	2nd term	
5	Eleanor Holmes Norton	D	DC	January 3, 1991	1st term	
	Antonio Colorado	D	PR	April 12, 1992	1st term	

== See also ==
- 102nd United States Congress
- List of United States congressional districts
- List of United States senators in the 102nd Congress
