= List of United States representatives in the 101st Congress =

This is a complete list of United States representatives during the 101st United States Congress listed by seniority.

As an historical article, the districts and party affiliations listed reflect those during the 101st Congress (January 3, 1989 – January 3, 1991). Seats and party affiliations on similar lists for other congresses will be different for certain members.

Seniority depends on the date on which members were sworn into office. Since many members are sworn in on the same day, subsequent ranking is based on previous congressional service of the individual and then by alphabetical order by the last name of the representatives.

Committee chairmanship in the House is often associated with seniority. However, party leadership is typically not associated with seniority.

Note: The "*" indicates that the representative/delegate may have served one or more non-consecutive terms while in the House of Representatives of the United States Congress.

== U.S. House seniority list ==
U.S. House seniority
Rank	Representative	Party	District	Seniority date (Previous service, if any)	No.# of term(s)	Notes
1	Jamie Whitten	D	MS-01	November 4, 1941	25th term	Dean of the House
2	Charles Edward Bennett	D	FL-03	January 3, 1949	21st term	
3	Jack Brooks	D	TX-09	January 3, 1953	19th term	
4	William Natcher	D	KY-02	August 1, 1953	19th term	
5	Dante Fascell	D	FL-19	January 3, 1955	18th term	
6	Jim Wright	D	TX-12	January 3, 1955	18th term	Speaker of the House; Resigned on June 30, 1989.
7	John Dingell	D	MI-16	December 13, 1955	18th term	
8	William Broomfield	R	MI-18	January 3, 1957	17th term	
9	Robert Michel	R	IL-18	January 3, 1957	17th term	
10	Silvio O. Conte	R	MA-01	January 3, 1959	16th term	
11	Robert Kastenmeier	D	WI-02	January 3, 1959	16th term	Left the House in 1991.
12	Dan Rostenkowski	D	IL-08	January 3, 1959	16th term	
13	Neal Smith	D	IA-04	January 3, 1959	16th term	
14	Mo Udall	D	AZ-02	May 2, 1961	15th term	
15	Henry B. González	D	TX-20	November 4, 1961	15th term	
16	Don Edwards	D	CA-10	January 3, 1963	14th term	
17	Sam Gibbons	D	FL-07	January 3, 1963	14th term	
18	Augustus F. Hawkins	D	CA-29	January 3, 1963	14th term	Left the House in 1991.
19	Frank Horton	R	NY-29	January 3, 1963	14th term	
20	Joseph McDade	R	PA-10	January 3, 1963	14th term	
21	Claude Pepper	D	FL-18	January 3, 1963	14th term	Died on May 30, 1989.
22	Jimmy Quillen	R	TN-01	January 3, 1963	14th term	
23	Edward R. Roybal	D	CA-25	January 3, 1963	14th term	
24	J. J. Pickle	D	TX-10	December 21, 1963	14th term	
25	Sidney Yates	D	IL-09	January 3, 1965; Previous service, 1949–1963.	20th term*	
26	Frank Annunzio	D	IL-11	January 3, 1965	13th term	
27	John Conyers	D	MI-01	January 3, 1965	13th term	
28	Bill Dickinson	R	AL-02	January 3, 1965	13th term	
29	Tom Foley	D	WA-05	January 3, 1965	13th term	Became Speaker of the House after Wright resigned.
30	William Ford	D	MI-15	January 3, 1965	13th term	
31	Kika De la Garza	D	TX-15	January 3, 1965	13th term	
32	Lee Hamilton	D	IN-09	January 3, 1965	13th term	
33	Walter B. Jones Sr.	D	NC-01	February 5, 1966	13th term	
34	Guy Vander Jagt	R	MI-09	November 8, 1966	13th term	
35	Tom Bevill	D	AL-04	January 3, 1967	12th term	
36	John Paul Hammerschmidt	R	AR-03	January 3, 1967	12th term	
37	Clarence E. Miller	R	OH-10	January 3, 1967	12th term	
38	Sonny Montgomery	D	MS-03	January 3, 1967	12th term	
39	John Myers	R	IN-07	January 3, 1967	12th term	
40	Chalmers Wylie	R	OH-15	January 3, 1967	12th term	
41	Joseph M. Gaydos	D	PA-20	November 5, 1968	12th term	
42	Bill Alexander	D	AR-01	January 3, 1969	11th term	
43	Glenn M. Anderson	D	CA-32	January 3, 1969	11th term	
44	Bill Clay	D	MO-01	January 3, 1969	11th term	
45	Lawrence Coughlin	R	PA-13	January 3, 1969	11th term	
46	Hamilton Fish	R	NY-21	January 3, 1969	11th term	
47	Louis Stokes	D	OH-21	January 3, 1969	11th term	
48	Gus Yatron	D	PA-06	January 3, 1969	11th term	
49	Dave Obey	D	WI-07	April 1, 1969	11th term	
50	Robert A. Roe	D	NJ-08	November 4, 1969	11th term	
51	Phil Crane	R	IL-12	November 25, 1969	11th term	
52	Bill Archer	R	TX-07	January 3, 1971	10th term	
53	Les Aspin	D	WI-01	January 3, 1971	10th term	
54	Ron Dellums	D	CA-08	January 3, 1971	10th term	
55	Bill Frenzel	R	MN-03	January 3, 1971	10th term	Left the House in 1991.
56	Norman F. Lent	R	NY-04	January 3, 1971	10th term	
57	Romano Mazzoli	D	KY-03	January 3, 1971	10th term	
58	Charles B. Rangel	D	NY-16	January 3, 1971	10th term	
59	Floyd Spence	R	SC-02	January 3, 1971	10th term	
60	Bill Young	R	FL-08	January 3, 1971	10th term	
61	George Brown Jr.	D	CA-36	January 3, 1973; Previous service, 1963–1971.	13th term*	
62	Benjamin A. Gilman	R	NY-22	January 3, 1973	9th term	
63	William Lehman	D	FL-17	January 3, 1973	9th term	
64	Edward Rell Madigan	R	IL-15	January 3, 1973	9th term	
65	Joe Moakley	D	MA-09	January 3, 1973	9th term	
66	Carlos Moorhead	R	CA-22	January 3, 1973	9th term	
67	Ralph Regula	R	OH-16	January 3, 1973	9th term	
68	Matthew John Rinaldo	R	NJ-07	January 3, 1973	9th term	
69	Charlie Rose	D	NC-07	January 3, 1973	9th term	
70	Patricia Schroeder	D	CO-01	January 3, 1973	9th term	
71	Bud Shuster	R	PA-09	January 3, 1973	9th term	
72	Pete Stark	D	CA-09	January 3, 1973	9th term	
73	Gerry Studds	D	MA-10	January 3, 1973	9th term	
74	Charles Wilson	D	TX-02	January 3, 1973	9th term	
75	Don Young	R	AK	March 6, 1973	9th term	
76	Lindy Boggs	D	LA-02	March 20, 1973	9th term	Left the House in 1991.
77	Cardiss Collins	D	IL-07	June 5, 1973	9th term	
78	John Murtha	D	PA-12	February 5, 1974	9th term	
79	Robert J. Lagomarsino	R	CA-19	March 5, 1974	9th term	
80	J. Bob Traxler	D	MI-08	April 23, 1974	9th term	
81	Les AuCoin	D	OR-01	January 3, 1975	8th term	
82	Butler Derrick	D	SC-03	January 3, 1975	8th term	
83	Thomas Downey	D	NY-02	January 3, 1975	8th term	
84	Joseph D. Early	D	MA-03	January 3, 1975	8th term	
85	Glenn English	D	OK-06	January 3, 1975	8th term	
86	James Florio	D	NJ-01	January 3, 1975	8th term	Resigned on January 16, 1990.
87	Harold Ford	D	TN-09	January 3, 1975	8th term	
88	Bill Goodling	R	PA-19	January 3, 1975	8th term	
89	Bill Gradison	R	OH-02	January 3, 1975	8th term	
90	Bill Hefner	D	NC-08	January 3, 1975	8th term	
91	William Hughes	D	NJ-02	January 3, 1975	8th term	
92	Carroll Hubbard	D	KY-01	January 3, 1975	8th term	
93	Henry Hyde	R	IL-06	January 3, 1975	8th term	
94	Andrew Jacobs Jr.	D	IN-10	January 3, 1975; Previous service, 1965–1973.	12th term*	
95	John LaFalce	D	NY-32	January 3, 1975	8th term	
96	Marilyn Lloyd	D	TN-03	January 3, 1975	8th term	
97	Matthew F. McHugh	D	NY-28	January 3, 1975	8th term	
98	George Miller	D	CA-07	January 3, 1975	8th term	
99	Norman Mineta	D	CA-13	January 3, 1975	8th term	
100	Stephen Neal	D	NC-05	January 3, 1975	8th term	
101	Henry J. Nowak	D	NY-33	January 3, 1975	8th term	
102	Jim Oberstar	D	MN-08	January 3, 1975	8th term	
103	Marty Russo	D	IL-03	January 3, 1975	8th term	
104	James H. Scheuer	D	NY-08	January 3, 1975; Previous service, 1965–1973.	12th term*	
105	Richard T. Schulze	R	PA-05	January 3, 1975	8th term	
106	Philip Sharp	D	IN-02	January 3, 1975	8th term	
107	Virginia D. Smith	R	NE-03	January 3, 1975	8th term	Left the House in 1991.
108	Stephen J. Solarz	D	NY-13	January 3, 1975	8th term	
109	Henry Waxman	D	CA-24	January 3, 1975	8th term	
110	Earl Thomas Coleman	R	MO-06	November 2, 1976	8th term	
111	Ed Markey	D	MA-07	November 2, 1976	8th term	
112	Daniel Akaka	D	HI-02	January 3, 1977	7th term	Resigned on May 16, 1990.
113	Douglas Applegate	D	OH-18	January 3, 1977	7th term	
114	Doug Barnard Jr.	D	GA-10	January 3, 1977	7th term	
115	Anthony C. Beilenson	D	CA-23	January 3, 1977	7th term	
116	David Bonior	D	MI-12	January 3, 1977	7th term	
117	Norm Dicks	D	WA-06	January 3, 1977	7th term	
118	Mickey Edwards	R	OK-05	January 3, 1977	7th term	
119	Ronnie Flippo	D	AL-05	January 3, 1977	7th term	Left the House in 1991.
120	Dick Gephardt	D	MO-03	January 3, 1977	7th term	
121	Dan Glickman	D	KS-04	January 3, 1977	7th term	
122	Jerry Huckaby	D	LA-05	January 3, 1977	7th term	
123	Andy Ireland	R	FL-10	January 3, 1977	7th term	
124	Ed Jenkins	D	GA-09	January 3, 1977	7th term	
125	Dale Kildee	D	MI-07	January 3, 1977	7th term	
126	Jim Leach	R	IA-01	January 3, 1977	7th term	
127	Tom Luken	D	OH-01	January 3, 1977; Previous service, 1974–1975.	8th term*	Left the House in 1991.
128	Ron Marlenee	R	MT-02	January 3, 1977	7th term	
129	Austin Murphy	D	PA-22	January 3, 1977	7th term	
130	Mary Rose Oakar	D	OH-20	January 3, 1977	7th term	
131	Leon Panetta	D	CA-16	January 3, 1977	7th term	
132	Donald J. Pease	D	OH-13	January 3, 1977	7th term	
133	Carl Pursell	R	MI-02	January 3, 1977	7th term	
134	Nick Rahall	D	WV-04	January 3, 1977	7th term	
135	Ike Skelton	D	MO-04	January 3, 1977	7th term	
136	Bob Stump	R	AZ-03	January 3, 1977	7th term	
137	Bruce Vento	D	MN-04	January 3, 1977	7th term	
138	Harold Volkmer	D	MO-09	January 3, 1977	7th term	
139	Doug Walgren	D	PA-18	January 3, 1977	7th term	Left the House in 1991.
140	Robert Walker	R	PA-16	January 3, 1977	7th term	
141	Wes Watkins	D	OK-03	January 3, 1977	7th term	Left the House in 1991.
142	Theodore S. Weiss	D	NY-17	January 3, 1977	7th term	
143	Arlan Stangeland	R	MN-07	February 22, 1977	7th term	Left the House in 1991.
144	Bob Livingston	R	LA-01	August 27, 1977	7th term	
145	S. William Green	R	NY-15	February 14, 1978	7th term	
146	Robert Garcia	D	NY-18	February 21, 1978	7th term	Resigned on January 7, 1990.
147	Beryl Anthony Jr.	D	AR-04	January 3, 1979	6th term	
148	Doug Bereuter	R	NE-01	January 3, 1979	6th term	
149	Beverly Byron	D	MD-06	January 3, 1979	6th term	
150	Dick Cheney	R	WY	January 3, 1979	6th term	Resigned on March 17, 1989.
151	Bill Clinger	R	PA-23	January 3, 1979	6th term	
152	Tony Coelho	D	CA-15	January 3, 1979	6th term	Resigned on June 15, 1989.
153	Jim Courter	R	NJ-12	January 3, 1979	6th term	Left the House in 1991.
154	William E. Dannemeyer	R	CA-39	January 3, 1979	6th term	
155	Robert William Davis	R	MI-11	January 3, 1979	6th term	
156	Julian C. Dixon	D	CA-28	January 3, 1979	6th term	
157	Brian J. Donnelly	D	MA-11	January 3, 1979	6th term	
158	Vic Fazio	D	CA-04	January 3, 1979	6th term	
159	Martin Frost	D	TX-24	January 3, 1979	6th term	
160	Newt Gingrich	R	GA-06	January 3, 1979	6th term	
161	William H. Gray	D	PA-02	January 3, 1979	6th term	
162	Frank Joseph Guarini	D	NJ-14	January 3, 1979	6th term	
163	Tony Hall	D	OH-03	January 3, 1979	6th term	
164	Larry J. Hopkins	R	KY-06	January 3, 1979	6th term	
165	Earl Dewitt Hutto	D	FL-01	January 3, 1979	6th term	
166	Marvin Leath	D	TX-11	January 3, 1979	6th term	Left the House in 1991.
167	Mickey Leland	D	TX-18	January 3, 1979	6th term	Died on August 7, 1989.
168	Jerry Lewis	R	CA-35	January 3, 1979	6th term	
169	Bob Matsui	D	CA-03	January 3, 1979	6th term	
170	Nicholas Mavroules	D	MA-06	January 3, 1979	6th term	
171	Bill Nelson	D	FL-11	January 3, 1979	6th term	Left the House in 1991.
172	Chip Pashayan	R	CA-17	January 3, 1979	6th term	Left the House in 1991.
173	Donald L. Ritter	D	PA-15	January 3, 1979	6th term	
174	Toby Roth	R	WI-08	January 3, 1979	6th term	
175	Martin Olav Sabo	D	MN-05	January 3, 1979	6th term	
176	James Sensenbrenner	R	WI-09	January 3, 1979	6th term	
177	Norman D. Shumway	R	CA-14	January 3, 1979	6th term	Left the House in 1991.
178	Olympia Snowe	R	ME-02	January 3, 1979	6th term	
179	Gerald Solomon	R	NY-24	January 3, 1979	6th term	
180	Charles Stenholm	D	TX-17	January 3, 1979	6th term	
181	Al Swift	D	WA-02	January 3, 1979	6th term	
182	Mike Synar	D	OK-02	January 3, 1979	6th term	
183	Tom Tauke	R	IA-02	January 3, 1979	6th term	Left the House in 1991.
184	Bill Thomas	R	CA-20	January 3, 1979	6th term	
185	Bob Whittaker	R	KS-05	January 3, 1979	6th term	Left the House in 1991.
186	Pat Williams	D	MT-01	January 3, 1979	6th term	
187	Howard Wolpe	D	MI-03	January 3, 1979	6th term	
188	Tom Petri	R	WI-06	April 3, 1979	6th term	
189	John Porter	R	IL-10	January 22, 1980	6th term	
190	Billy Tauzin	D	LA-03	May 22, 1980	6th term	
191	George W. Crockett Jr.	D	MI-13	November 4, 1980	6th term	Left the House in 1991.
192	Thomas Bliley	R	VA-03	January 3, 1981	5th term	
193	Hank Brown	R	CO-04	January 3, 1981	5th term	Left the House in 1991.
194	Larry Craig	R	ID-01	January 3, 1981	5th term	Left the House in 1991.
195	William Coyne	D	PA-14	January 3, 1981	5th term	
196	David Dreier	R	CA-33	January 3, 1981	5th term	
197	Byron Dorgan	D	ND	January 3, 1981	5th term	
198	Bernard J. Dwyer	D	NJ-06	January 3, 1981	5th term	
199	Mervyn M. Dymally	D	CA-31	January 3, 1981	5th term	
200	Roy Dyson	D	MD-01	January 3, 1981	5th term	Left the House in 1991.
201	Dennis E. Eckart	D	OH-11	January 3, 1981	5th term	
202	Bill Emerson	R	MO-08	January 3, 1981	5th term	
203	Jack Fields	R	TX-08	January 3, 1981	5th term	
204	Tom Foglietta	D	PA-01	January 3, 1981	5th term	
205	Barney Frank	D	MA-04	January 3, 1981	5th term	
206	Sam Gejdenson	D	CT-02	January 3, 1981	5th term	
207	Steve Gunderson	R	WI-03	January 3, 1981	5th term	
208	Ralph Hall	D	TX-04	January 3, 1981	5th term	
209	James Hansen	R	UT-01	January 3, 1981	5th term	
210	Charles Floyd Hatcher	D	GA-02	January 3, 1981	5th term	
211	Dennis M. Hertel	D	MI-14	January 3, 1981	5th term	
212	John P. Hiler	R	IN-03	January 3, 1981	5th term	Left the House in 1991.
213	Duncan Hunter	R	CA-45	January 3, 1981	5th term	
214	Tom Lantos	D	CA-11	January 3, 1981	5th term	
215	Bill Lowery	R	CA-41	January 3, 1981	5th term	
216	David O'Brien Martin	R	NY-26	January 3, 1981	5th term	
217	Lynn Morley Martin	R	IL-16	January 3, 1981	5th term	Left the House in 1991.
218	Bill McCollum	R	FL-05	January 3, 1981	5th term	
219	Dave McCurdy	D	OK-04	January 3, 1981	5th term	
220	Bob McEwen	R	OH-06	January 3, 1981	5th term	
221	Guy Molinari	R	NY-14	January 3, 1981	5th term	Resigned on December 31, 1989.
222	Sid Morrison	R	WA-04	January 3, 1981	5th term	
223	Raymond J. McGrath	R	NY-05	January 3, 1981	5th term	
224	Stanford Parris	R	VA-08	January 3, 1981; Previous service, 1973–1975.	6th term*	Left the House in 1991.
225	Pat Roberts	R	KS-01	January 3, 1981	5th term	
226	Hal Rogers	R	KY-05	January 3, 1981	5th term	
227	Marge Roukema	R	NJ-05	January 3, 1981	5th term	
228	Gus Savage	D	IL-02	January 3, 1981	5th term	
229	Claudine Schneider	R	RI-02	January 3, 1981	5th term	Left the House in 1991.
230	Chuck Schumer	D	NY-10	January 3, 1981	5th term	
231	E. Clay Shaw Jr.	R	FL-15	January 3, 1981	5th term	
232	Joe Skeen	R	NM-02	January 3, 1981	5th term	
233	Christopher Smith	R	NJ-04	January 3, 1981	5th term	
234	Denny Smith	R	OR-05	January 3, 1981	5th term	Left the House in 1991.
235	Vin Weber	R	MN-02	January 3, 1981	5th term	
236	Frank Wolf	R	VA-10	January 3, 1981	5th term	
237	Ron Wyden	D	OR-03	January 3, 1981	5th term	
238	Steny H. Hoyer	D	MD-05	May 19, 1981	5th term	
239	Mike Oxley	R	OH-04	June 25, 1981	5th term	
240	Barbara B. Kennelly	D	CT-01	January 12, 1982	5th term	
241	Matthew G. Martínez	D	CA-30	July 13, 1982	5th term	
242	Michael Andrews	D	TX-25	January 3, 1983	4th term	
243	Steve Bartlett	R	TX-03	January 3, 1983	4th term	
244	Jim Bates	D	CA-44	January 3, 1983	4th term	Left the House in 1991.
245	Herbert Bateman	R	VA-01	January 3, 1983	4th term	
246	Howard Berman	D	CA-26	January 3, 1983	4th term	
247	Michael Bilirakis	R	FL-09	January 3, 1983	4th term	
248	Sherwood Boehlert	R	NY-25	January 3, 1983	4th term	
249	Robert A. Borski Jr.	D	PA-03	January 3, 1983	4th term	
250	Douglas H. Bosco	D	CA-01	January 3, 1983	4th term	Left the House in 1991.
251	Rick Boucher	D	VA-09	January 3, 1983	4th term	
252	Barbara Boxer	D	CA-06	January 3, 1983	4th term	
253	John Bryant	D	TX-05	January 3, 1983	4th term	
254	Dan Burton	R	IN-06	January 3, 1983	4th term	
255	Thomas Carper	D	DE	January 3, 1983	4th term	
256	Bob Carr	D	MI-06	January 3, 1983; Previous service, 1975–1981.	7th term*	
257	Rod Chandler	R	WA-08	January 3, 1983	4th term	
258	Ron Coleman	D	TX-16	January 3, 1983	4th term	
259	Jim Cooper	D	TN-04	January 3, 1983	4th term	
260	Mike DeWine	R	OH-07	January 3, 1983	4th term	Left the House in 1991.
261	Richard Durbin	D	IL-20	January 3, 1983	4th term	
262	Ben Erdreich	D	AL-06	January 3, 1983	4th term	
263	Lane Evans	D	IL-17	January 3, 1983	4th term	
264	Ed Feighan	D	OH-19	January 3, 1983	4th term	
265	George Gekas	R	PA-17	January 3, 1983	4th term	
266	Nancy Johnson	R	CT-06	January 3, 1983	4th term	
267	Marcy Kaptur	D	OH-09	January 3, 1983	4th term	
268	John Kasich	R	OH-12	January 3, 1983	4th term	
269	Joseph P. Kolter	D	PA-04	January 3, 1983	4th term	
270	Peter H. Kostmayer	D	PA-08	January 3, 1983; Previous service, 1977–1981.	6th term*	
271	Richard H. Lehman	D	CA-18	January 3, 1983	4th term	
272	Sander Levin	D	MI-17	January 3, 1983	4th term	
273	Mel Levine	D	CA-27	January 3, 1983	4th term	
274	Tom Lewis	R	FL-12	January 3, 1983	4th term	
275	Bill Lipinski	D	IL-05	January 3, 1983	4th term	
276	Al McCandless	R	CA-37	January 3, 1983	4th term	
277	Alan Mollohan	D	WV-01	January 3, 1983	4th term	
278	Jim Moody	D	WI-05	January 3, 1983	4th term	
279	Bruce Morrison	D	CT-03	January 3, 1983	4th term	Left the House in 1991.
280	Robert J. Mrazek	D	NY-03	January 3, 1983	4th term	
281	Howard C. Nielson	R	UT-03	January 3, 1983	4th term	Left the House in 1991.
282	Jim Olin	D	VA-06	January 3, 1983	4th term	
283	Solomon Ortiz	D	TX-27	January 3, 1983	4th term	
284	Major Owens	D	NY-12	January 3, 1983	4th term	
285	Ron Packard	R	CA-43	January 3, 1983	4th term	
286	Tim Penny	D	MN-01	January 3, 1983	4th term	
287	Richard Ray	D	GA-03	January 3, 1983	4th term	
288	Bill Richardson	D	NM-03	January 3, 1983	4th term	
289	Tom Ridge	R	PA-21	January 3, 1983	4th term	
290	James Rowland	D	GA-08	January 3, 1983	4th term	
291	Gerry Sikorski	D	MN-06	January 3, 1983	4th term	
292	Norman Sisisky	D	VA-04	January 3, 1983	4th term	
293	Jim Slattery	D	KS-02	January 3, 1983	4th term	
294	Lawrence J. Smith	D	FL-16	January 3, 1983	4th term	
295	Robert Smith	R	OR-02	January 3, 1983	4th term	
296	John Spratt	D	SC-05	January 3, 1983	4th term	
297	Harley O. Staggers Jr.	D	WV-02	January 3, 1983	4th term	
298	Don Sundquist	R	TN-07	January 3, 1983	4th term	
299	Robin Tallon	D	SC-06	January 3, 1983	4th term	
300	Lindsay Thomas	D	GA-01	January 3, 1983	4th term	
301	Esteban Edward Torres	D	CA-34	January 3, 1983	4th term	
302	Robert Torricelli	D	NJ-09	January 3, 1983	4th term	
303	Ed Towns	D	NY-11	January 3, 1983	4th term	
304	Tim Valentine	D	NC-02	January 3, 1983	4th term	
305	Barbara Vucanovich	R	NV-02	January 3, 1983	4th term	
306	Alan Wheat	D	MO-05	January 3, 1983	4th term	
307	Bob Wise	D	WV-03	January 3, 1983	4th term	
308	Gary Ackerman	D	NY-07	March 1, 1983	4th term	
309	Daniel Schaefer	R	CO-06	March 29, 1983	4th term	
310	Charles Hayes	D	IL-01	August 23, 1983	4th term	
311	George Darden	D	GA-07	November 8, 1983	4th term	
312	Jerry Kleczka	D	WI-04	April 3, 1984	4th term	
313	Carl C. Perkins	D	KY-07	November 6, 1984	4th term	
314	Jim Saxton	R	NJ-13	November 6, 1984	4th term	
315	Dick Armey	R	TX-26	January 3, 1985	3rd term	
316	Chester G. Atkins	D	MA-05	January 3, 1985	3rd term	
317	Joe Barton	R	TX-06	January 3, 1985	3rd term	
318	Helen Bentley	R	MD-02	January 3, 1985	3rd term	
319	Terry L. Bruce	D	IL-19	January 3, 1985	3rd term	
320	Albert Bustamante	D	TX-23	January 3, 1985	3rd term	
321	Sonny Callahan	R	AL-01	January 3, 1985	3rd term	
322	Howard Coble	R	NC-06	January 3, 1985	3rd term	
323	Larry Combest	R	TX-19	January 3, 1985	3rd term	
324	Tom DeLay	R	TX-22	January 3, 1985	3rd term	
325	Bob Dornan	R	CA-38	January 3, 1985; Previous service, 1977–1983.	6th term*	
326	Harris Fawell	R	IL-13	January 3, 1985	3rd term	
327	Dean Gallo	R	NJ-11	January 3, 1985	3rd term	
328	Bart Gordon	D	TN-06	January 3, 1985	3rd term	
329	Paul Henry	R	MI-05	January 3, 1985	3rd term	
330	Paul Kanjorski	D	PA-11	January 3, 1985	3rd term	
331	Jim Kolbe	R	AZ-05	January 3, 1985	3rd term	
332	Jim Lightfoot	R	IA-05	January 3, 1985	3rd term	
333	Thomas J. Manton	D	NY-09	January 3, 1985	3rd term	
334	Alex McMillan	R	NC-09	January 3, 1985	3rd term	
335	Jan Meyers	R	KS-03	January 3, 1985	3rd term	
336	John Miller	R	WA-01	January 3, 1985	3rd term	
337	Tommy F. Robinson	D	AR-02	January 3, 1985	3rd term	Left the House in 1991.
338	John G. Rowland	R	CT-05	January 3, 1985	3rd term	Left the House in 1991.
339	Bill Schuette	R	MI-10	January 3, 1985	3rd term	Left the House in 1991.
340	D. French Slaughter Jr.	R	VA-07	January 3, 1985	3rd term	
341	Bob Smith	R	NH-01	January 3, 1985	3rd term	Resigned on December 7, 1990.
342	Richard H. Stallings	D	ID-02	January 3, 1985	3rd term	
343	James Traficant	D	OH-17	January 3, 1985	3rd term	
344	Peter Visclosky	D	IN-01	January 3, 1985	3rd term	
345	Frank McCloskey	D	IN-08	May 1, 1985; Previous service, 1983–1985.	4th term*	
346	Jim Chapman	D	TX-01	August 3, 1985	3rd term	
347	Cass Ballenger	R	NC-10	November 4, 1986	3rd term	
348	Richard Baker	R	LA-06	January 3, 1987	2nd term	
349	James Bilbray	D	NV-01	January 3, 1987	2nd term	
350	Joseph E. Brennan	D	ME-01	January 3, 1987	2nd term	Left the House in 1991.
351	Jack Buechner	R	MO-02	January 3, 1987	2nd term	Left the House in 1991.
352	Jim Bunning	R	KY-04	January 3, 1987	2nd term	
353	Ben Nighthorse Campbell	D	CO-03	January 3, 1987	2nd term	
354	Ben Cardin	D	MD-03	January 3, 1987	2nd term	
355	James M. Clarke	D	NC-11	January 3, 1987; Previous service, 1983–1985.	3rd term*	Left the House in 1991.
356	Peter DeFazio	D	OR-04	January 3, 1987	2nd term	
357	Mike Espy	D	MS-02	January 3, 1987	2nd term	
358	Floyd Flake	D	NY-06	January 3, 1987	2nd term	
359	Elton Gallegly	R	CA-21	January 3, 1987	2nd term	
360	Fred Grandy	R	IA-06	January 3, 1987	2nd term	
361	Bill Grant	D	FL-02	January 3, 1987	2nd term	Left the House in 1991.
362	Claude Harris Jr.	D	AL-07	January 3, 1987	2nd term	
363	Dennis Hastert	R	IL-14	January 3, 1987	2nd term	
364	Jimmy Hayes	D	LA-07	January 3, 1987	2nd term	
365	Joel Hefley	R	CO-05	January 3, 1987	2nd term	
366	Wally Herger	R	CA-02	January 3, 1987	2nd term	
367	George Hochbrueckner	D	NY-01	January 3, 1987	2nd term	
368	Clyde C. Holloway	R	LA-08	January 3, 1987	2nd term	
369	Amo Houghton	R	NY-34	January 3, 1987	2nd term	
370	Jim Inhofe	R	OK-01	January 3, 1987	2nd term	
371	Tim Johnson	D	SD	January 3, 1987	2nd term	
372	Jim Jontz	D	IN-05	January 3, 1987	2nd term	
373	Joseph Kennedy II	D	MA-08	January 3, 1987	2nd term	
374	Jon Kyl	R	AZ-04	January 3, 1987	2nd term	
375	Martin Lancaster	D	NC-03	January 3, 1987	2nd term	
376	John Lewis	D	GA-05	January 3, 1987	2nd term	
377	Buz Lukens	R	OH-08	January 3, 1987; Previous service, 1967–1971.	4th term*	Resigned on October 24, 1990.
378	Charles Thomas McMillen	D	MD-04	January 3, 1987	2nd term	
379	Kweisi Mfume	D	MD-07	January 3, 1987	2nd term	
380	Connie Morella	R	MD-08	January 3, 1987	2nd term	
381	David R. Nagle	D	IA-03	January 3, 1987	2nd term	
382	Wayne Owens	D	UT-02	January 3, 1987; Previous service, 1973–1975.	3rd term*	
383	Liz J. Patterson	D	SC-04	January 3, 1987	2nd term	
384	Owen Pickett	D	VA-02	January 3, 1987	2nd term	
385	David Price	D	NC-04	January 3, 1987	2nd term	
386	Arthur Ravenel	R	SC-01	January 3, 1987	2nd term	
387	John J. Rhodes III	R	AZ-01	January 3, 1987	2nd term	
388	Pat Saiki	R	HI-01	January 3, 1987	2nd term	Left the House in 1991.
389	Thomas Sawyer	D	OH-14	January 3, 1987	2nd term	
390	David Skaggs	D	CO-02	January 3, 1987	2nd term	
391	Louise Slaughter	D	NY-30	January 3, 1987	2nd term	
392	Lamar Smith	R	TX-21	January 3, 1987	2nd term	
393	Fred Upton	R	MI-04	January 3, 1987	2nd term	
394	Curt Weldon	R	PA-07	January 3, 1987	2nd term	
395	Nancy Pelosi	D	CA-05	June 2, 1987	2nd term	
396	Chris Shays	R	CT-04	August 18, 1987	2nd term	
397	Bob Clement	D	TN-05	January 19, 1988	2nd term	
398	Jim McCrery	R	LA-04	April 16, 1988	2nd term	
399	Lewis Payne	D	VA-05	June 14, 1988	2nd term	
400	Jerry Costello	D	IL-21	August 9, 1988	2nd term	
401	Jimmy Duncan	R	TN-02	November 8, 1988	2nd term	
402	Frank Pallone	D	NJ-03	November 8, 1988	2nd term	
403	Tom Campbell	R	CA-12	January 3, 1989	1st term	
404	Christopher Cox	R	CA-40	January 3, 1989	1st term	
405	Charles Douglas III	R	NH-02	January 3, 1989	1st term	Left the House in 1991.
406	Eliot Engel	D	NY-19	January 3, 1989	1st term	
407	Paul Gillmor	R	OH-05	January 3, 1989	1st term	
408	Porter Goss	R	FL-13	January 3, 1989	1st term	
409	Mel Hancock	R	MO-07	January 3, 1989	1st term	
410	Peter Hoagland	D	NE-02	January 3, 1989	1st term	
411	Craig James	R	FL-04	January 3, 1989	1st term	
412	Harry A. Johnston	D	FL-14	January 3, 1989	1st term	
413	Ben Jones	D	GA-04	January 3, 1989	1st term	
414	Greg Laughlin	D	TX-14	January 3, 1989	1st term	
415	Nita Lowey	D	NY-20	January 3, 1989	1st term	
416	Ronald Machtley	R	RI-01	January 3, 1989	1st term	
417	Jim McDermott	D	WA-07	January 3, 1989	1st term	
418	Mike McNulty	D	NY-23	January 3, 1989	1st term	
419	Richard Neal	D	MA-02	January 3, 1989	1st term	
420	Mike Parker	D	MS-04	January 3, 1989	1st term	
421	Bill Paxon	R	NY-31	January 3, 1989	1st term	
422	Donald Payne	D	NJ-10	January 3, 1989	1st term	
423	Glenn Poshard	D	IL-22	January 3, 1989	1st term	
424	Dana Rohrabacher	R	CA-42	January 3, 1989	1st term	
425	George E. Sangmeister	D	IL-04	January 3, 1989	1st term	
426	Bill Sarpalius	D	TX-13	January 3, 1989	1st term	
427	Steven Schiff	R	NM-01	January 3, 1989	1st term	
428	Larkin I. Smith	R	MS-05	January 3, 1989	1st term	Died on August 13, 1989.
429	Peter P. Smith	R	VT	January 3, 1989	1st term	Left the House in 1991.
430	Cliff Stearns	R	FL-06	January 3, 1989	1st term	
431	John Tanner	D	TN-08	January 3, 1989	1st term	
432	Jolene Unsoeld	D	WA-03	January 3, 1989	1st term	
433	James Walsh	R	NY-27	January 3, 1989	1st term	
434	Jill Long	D	IN-04	March 28, 1989	1st term	
	Glen Browder	D	AL-03	April 4, 1989	1st term	
	Craig Thomas	R	WY	April 26, 1989	1st term	
	Ileana Ros-Lehtinen	R	FL-18	August 29, 1989	1st term	
	Gary Condit	D	CA-15	September 12, 1989	1st term	
	Pete Geren	D	TX-12	September 12, 1989	1st term	
	Gene Taylor	D	MS-05	October 17, 1989	1st term	
	Craig Washington	D	TX-18	December 9, 1989	1st term	
	Susan Molinari	R	NY-14	March 20, 1990	1st term	
	José Serrano	D	NY-18	March 21, 1990	1st term	
	Patsy Mink	D	HI-02	September 22, 1990; Previous service, 1965–1977.	7th term*	
	Rob Andrews	D	NJ-01	November 6, 1990	1st term	

== Delegates ==
Rank	Delegate	Party	District	Seniority date (Previous service, if any)	No.# of term(s)	Notes
1	Walter E. Fauntroy	D	DC	March 23, 1971	10th term	
2	Ron de Lugo	D	VI	January 3, 1981; Previous service, 1973–1979.	8th term*	
3	Jaime Fuster	D	PR	January 3, 1985	3rd term	
4	Vicente T. Blaz	R	GU	January 3, 1985	3rd term	
5	Eni Faleomavaega	D	AS	January 3, 1989	1st term	

== See also ==
- 101st United States Congress
- List of United States congressional districts
- List of United States senators in the 101st Congress
