= List of new members of the 107th United States Congress =

The 107th United States Congress began on January 3, 2001. There were eleven new senators (nine Democrats, two Republicans) and 41 representatives (28 Republicans, 13 Democrats), as well as one new delegate (a Democrat) at the start of the first session. Additionally, four senators (three Republicans, one third party member) and nine representatives (three Democrats, six Republicans) took office on various dates in order to fill vacancies during the 107th Congress before it ended on January 3, 2003.

== Senate ==
=== Took office January 3, 2001 ===
| State | Image | Senator | Seniority | Switched party | Prior background | Birth year |
|---|---|---|---|---|---|---|
| Delaware | | Tom Carper (D) | 2nd (91st overall) | Yes; Defeated William Roth (R) | Governor of Delaware; U.S. House of Representatives (Note: Elected to the 98th Congress, serving from 1983 to 1993 in Delaware's at-large congressional district.); Treasurer of Delaware | 1947 |
| Florida | | Bill Nelson (D) | 1st (90th overall) | Yes; Open seat; replaced Connie Mack III (R) | U.S. House of Representatives (Note: Elected to the 96th Congress, serving in Florida's 9th congressional district from 1979 to 1983 and in Florida's 11th congressional district from 1983 to 1991.); Florida House of Representatives | 1942 |
| Michigan | | Debbie Stabenow (D) | 3rd (92nd overall) | Yes; Defeated Spencer Abraham (R) | U.S. House of Representatives (Note: Elected to the 105th Congress, serving from 1997 to 2001 in Michigan's 8th congressional district.); Michigan Senate; Michigan House of Representatives | 1950 |
| Minnesota (Class 1) | | Mark Dayton (DFL) | 11th (100th overall) | Yes; Defeated Rod Grams (R) | Minnesota State Auditor | 1947 |
| Missouri | | Jean Carnahan (D) | 10th (99th overall) | Yes; Defeated John Ashcroft (R) (Note: Mel Carnahan (D) defeated incumbent John Ashcroft (R), despite his death three weeks prior to the election. Governor Roger B. Wilson appointed his widow Jean to the seat.) | First Lady of Missouri | 1933 |
| Nebraska | | Ben Nelson (D) | 7th (96th overall) | No; Open seat; replaced Bob Kerrey (D) | Governor of Nebraska | 1941 |
| Nevada | | John Ensign (R) | 4th (93rd overall) | Yes; Open seat; replaced Richard Bryan (D) | U.S. House of Representatives (Note: Elected to the 104th Congress, serving from 1995 to 1999 in Nevada's 1st congressional district.) | 1958 |
| New Jersey | | Jon Corzine (D) | 9th (98th overall) | No; Open seat; replaced Frank Lautenberg (D) | None | 1947 |
| New York | | Hillary Clinton (D) | 8th (97th overall) | No; Open seat; replaced Daniel Patrick Moynihan (D) | First Lady of the United States; First Lady of Arkansas | 1947 |
| Virginia | | George Allen (R) | 5th (94th overall) | Yes; Defeated Chuck Robb (D) | Governor of Virginia; U.S. House of Representatives (Note: Elected to the 102nd Congress, serving from 1991 to 1993 in Virginia's 7th congressional district.); Virginia House of Delegates | 1952 |
| Washington | | Maria Cantwell (D) | 6th (95th overall) | Yes; Defeated Slade Gorton (R) | U.S. House of Representatives (Note: Elected to the 103rd Congress, serving from 1993 to 1995 in Washington's 1st congressional district.); Washington House of Representatives | 1958 |

=== Took office during the 107th Congress ===
| State | Image | Senator | Took office | Switched party | Prior background | Birth year |
|---|---|---|---|---|---|---|
| Minnesota (Class 2) | | Dean Barkley (IMN) | November 4, 2002 | Yes; Appointed; replaced Paul Wellstone (DFL) | None | 1950 |
| Missouri | | Jim Talent (R) | November 25, 2002 | Yes; Defeated Jean Carnahan (D) | U.S. House of Representatives (Note: Elected to the 103rd Congress, serving from 1993 to 2001 in Missouri's 2nd congressional district.); Missouri House of Representatives | 1956 |
| Texas | | John Cornyn (R) | December 2, 2002 | No; Open seat; replaced Phil Gramm (R) | Texas Attorney General; Texas Supreme Court | 1952 |
| Alaska | | Lisa Murkowski (R) | December 20, 2002 | No; Appointed; replaced Frank Murkowski (R) | Alaska House of Representatives | 1957 |

== House of Representatives ==
=== Took office January 3, 2001 ===
| District | Representative | Switched party | Prior background | Birth year |
|---|---|---|---|---|
| Arizona 1 | Jeff Flake (R) | No | Missionary | 1962 |
| Arkansas 4 | Mike Ross (D) | Yes | Businessman | 1961 |
| California 15 | Mike Honda (D) | Yes | State Assemblyman | 1941 |
| California 27 | Adam Schiff (D) | Yes | State Senator | 1960 |
| California 31 | Hilda Solis (D) | Yes | State Senator | 1957 |
| California 36 | Jane Harman (D) | Yes | U.S. House of Representatives (Note: Previously elected to the 103rd Congress, serving from 1993 to 1999.) | 1945 |
| California 48 | Darrell Issa (R) | No | CEO of Directed Electronics | 1953 |
| California 49 | Susan Davis (D) | Yes | State Assemblywoman | 1944 |
| Connecticut 2 | Rob Simmons (R) | Yes | State Representative | 1943 |
| Florida 4 | Ander Crenshaw (R) | No | State Senator | 1944 |
| Florida 8 | Ric Keller (R) | No | Lawyer | 1964 |
| Florida 12 | Adam Putnam (R) | No | State Representative | 1974 |
| Idaho 1 | Butch Otter (R) | No | Lieutenant Governor of Idaho | 1942 |
| Illinois 10 | Mark Kirk (R) | No | Congressional chief of staff | 1959 |
| Illinois 15 | Tim Johnson (R) | No | State Representative | 1946 |
| Indiana 2 | Mike Pence (R) | No | Radio host | 1959 |
| Indiana 7 | Brian D. Kerns (R) | No | Journalist | 1957 |
| Michigan 8 | Mike Rogers (R) | Yes | State Senator | 1963 |
| Minnesota 2 | Mark Kennedy (R) | No | Certified Public Accountant | 1957 |
| Minnesota 4 | Betty McCollum (D) | No | State Representative | 1954 |
| Missouri 1 | Lacy Clay (D) | No | State Senator | 1956 |
| Missouri 2 | Todd Akin (R) | No | State Representative | 1947 |
| Missouri 6 | Sam Graves (R) | Yes | State Senator | 1963 |
| Montana at-large | Denny Rehberg (R) | No | Lieutenant Governor of Montana | 1955 |
| Nebraska 3 | Tom Osborne (R) | No | Football coach | 1937 |
| New Jersey 7 | Mike Ferguson (R) | No | Instructor | 1970 |
| New York 1 | Felix Grucci (R) | Yes | Town supervisor | 1951 |
| New York 2 | Steve Israel (D) | Yes | Town councilman | 1958 |
| Ohio 12 | Pat Tiberi (R) | No | State Representative | 1962 |
| Oklahoma 2 | Brad Carson (D) | Yes | White House Fellow | 1967 |
| Pennsylvania 4 | Melissa Hart (R) | Yes | State Senator | 1962 |
| Pennsylvania 19 | Todd Russell Platts (R) | No | State Representative | 1962 |
| Rhode Island 2 | James Langevin (D) | No | Secretary of State of Rhode Island | 1964 |
| South Carolina 1 | Henry E. Brown Jr. (R) | No | State Representative | 1935 |
| Texas 7 | John Culberson (R) | No | State Representative | 1956 |
| Utah 2 | Jim Matheson (D) | Yes | Energy consultant | 1960 |
| Virginia 1 | Jo Ann Davis (R) | No | State Delegate | 1950 |
| Virginia 2 | Ed Schrock (R) | Yes | State Senator | 1941 |
| Virginia 7 | Eric Cantor (R) | No | State Delegate | 1963 |
| Washington 2 | Rick Larsen (D) | Yes | Lobbyist; Snohomish County Councilmember | 1965 |
| West Virginia 2 | Shelley Moore Capito (R) | Yes | State Delegate | 1953 |

==== Non-voting members ====
| District | Delegate | Switched party | Prior background | Birth year |
|---|---|---|---|---|
| Puerto Rico at-large | Aníbal Acevedo Vilá (PD/D) | Yes/No (Note: The previous delegate, Carlos Romero Barceló, was registered as New Progressive/Democratic.) | Lawyer | 1962 |

=== Took office during the 107th Congress ===
| District | Representative | Took office | Switched party | Prior background | Birth year |
|---|---|---|---|---|---|
| Pennsylvania 9 | Bill Shuster (R) | May 15, 2001 | No | Businessman | 1961 |
| California 32 | Diane Watson (D) | June 5, 2001 | No | U.S. Ambassador to Micronesia | 1933 |
| Virginia 4 | Randy Forbes (R) | June 19, 2001 | Yes | State Senator | 1952 |
| Florida 1 | Jeff Miller (R) | October 16, 2001 | No | State Representative | 1959 |
| Massachusetts 9 | Stephen Lynch (D) | October 16, 2001 | No | State Senator | 1955 |
| Arkansas 3 | John Boozman (R) | November 20, 2001 | No | Optometrist | 1950 |
| South Carolina 2 | Joe Wilson (R) | December 18, 2001 | No | State Senator | 1947 |
| Oklahoma 1 | John A. Sullivan (R) | February 15, 2002 | No | State Representative | 1965 |
| Hawaii 2 | Ed Case (D) | November 30, 2002 | No | State Representative | 1952 |

== See also ==
- List of United States representatives in the 107th Congress
- List of United States senators in the 107th Congress

== Notes ==
| Preceded by New members of the 106th Congress | New members of the 107th Congress; 2001–2003 | Succeeded by New members of the 108th Congress |
