= List of new members of the 108th United States Congress =

The 108th United States Congress began on January 3, 2003. There were nine new senators (seven Republicans, two Democrats) and 53 new representatives (32 Republicans, 21 Democrats), as well as one new delegate (a Democrat), at the start of its first session. Additionally, four representatives (three Democrats, one Republican) took office on various dates in order to fill vacancies during the 108th Congress before it ended on January 3, 2005.

Due to redistricting after the 2000 census, 16 representatives were elected from newly established congressional districts.

== Senate ==
| State | Image | Senator | Seniority | Switched party | Prior background | Birth year |
|---|---|---|---|---|---|---|
| Arkansas | | Mark Pryor (D) | 8th (100th overall) | Yes; Defeated Tim Hutchinson (R) | Attorney General of Arkansas; Arkansas House of Representatives | 1963 |
| Georgia | | Saxby Chambliss (R) | 2nd (94th overall) | Yes; Defeated Max Cleland (D) | U.S. House of Representatives (Note: Elected to the 104th Congress, serving from 1995 to 2003 in Georgia's 8th congressional district.) | 1943 |
| Minnesota | | Norm Coleman (R) | 7th (99th overall) | Yes; Open seat; replaced Dean Barkley (IMN) | Mayor of Saint Paul | 1949 |
| New Hampshire | | John E. Sununu (R) | 4th (96th overall) | No; Defeated Bob Smith (R) in a primary | U.S. House of Representatives (Note: Elected to the 105th Congress, serving from 1997 to 2003 in New Hampshire's 1st congressional district.) | 1964 |
| New Jersey | | Frank Lautenberg (D) | 1st (93rd overall) | No; Replaced Robert Torricelli (D), who withdrew after the primary | U.S. Senate (Note: Previously elected to the 97th Congress, serving from 1982 to 2001.) | 1924 |
| North Carolina | | Elizabeth Dole (R) | 6th (98th overall) | No; Open seat; replaced Jesse Helms (R) | U.S. Secretary of Labor; U.S. Secretary of Transportation; Federal Trade Commission | 1936 |
| South Carolina | | Lindsey Graham (R) | 3rd (95th overall) | No; Open seat; replaced Strom Thurmond (R) | U.S. House of Representatives (Note: Elected to the 104th Congress, serving from 1995 to 2003 in South Carolina's 3rd congressional district.); South Carolina House of Representatives | 1955 |
| Tennessee | | Lamar Alexander (R) | 5th (97th overall) | No; Open seat; replaced Fred Thompson (R) | U.S. Secretary of Education; Governor of Tennessee | 1940 |

== House of Representatives ==
=== Took office January 3, 2003 ===
| District | Representative | Switched party | Prior background | Birth year |
|---|---|---|---|---|
| Alabama 1 | Jo Bonner (R) | No | Campaign press secretary | 1959 |
| Alabama 3 | Mike Rogers (R) | No | State Representative | 1958 |
| Alabama 7 | Artur Davis (D) | No | Attorney | 1967 |
| Arizona 1 | Rick Renzi (R) | New seat | Property and casualty agent | 1958 |
| Arizona 2 | Trent Franks (R) | No | State Representative | 1957 |
| Arizona 7 | Raúl Grijalva (D) | New seat | Pima County supervisor | 1948 |
| California 18 | Dennis Cardoza (D) | No | State Assemblyman | 1959 |
| California 21 | Devin Nunes (R) | New seat | Dairy farmer | 1973 |
| California 39 | Linda Sánchez (D) | Yes | Labor lawyer | 1969 |
| Colorado 4 | Marilyn Musgrave (R) | No | State Senator | 1949 |
| Colorado 7 | Bob Beauprez (R) | New seat | State Party Chairman | 1948 |
| Florida 5 | Ginny Brown-Waite (R) | Yes | State Senator | 1943 |
| Florida 13 | Katherine Harris (R) | No | Secretary of State of Florida | 1957 |
| Florida 17 | Kendrick Meek (D) | No | State Senator | 1966 |
| Florida 24 | Tom Feeney (R) | New seat | State House Speaker | 1958 |
| Florida 25 | Mario Diaz-Balart (R) | New seat | State Senator | 1961 |
| Georgia 3 | Jim Marshall (D) | Yes | Mayor of Macon | 1948 |
| Georgia 4 | Denise Majette (D) | No | Judge | 1955 |
| Georgia 11 | Phil Gingrey (R) | New seat | State Senator | 1942 |
| Georgia 12 | Max Burns (R) | New seat | Professor | 1948 |
| Georgia 13 | David Scott | New seat | State Senator | 1945 |
| Illinois 5 | Rahm Emanuel (D) | No | Senior Advisor to the President | 1959 |
| Indiana 2 | Chris Chocola (R) | Yes | Businessman | 1962 |
| Iowa 5 | Steve King (R) | No | State Senator | 1949 |
| Louisiana 5 | Rodney Alexander (D) | Yes | State Representative | 1946 |
| Maine 2 | Mike Michaud (D) | No | State Senator | 1955 |
| Maryland 2 | Dutch Ruppersberger (D) | Yes | County Executive | 1946 |
| Maryland 8 | Chris Van Hollen (D) | Yes | State Senator | 1959 |
| Michigan 10 | Candice Miller (R) | Yes | Secretary of State of Michigan | 1954 |
| Michigan 11 | Thaddeus McCotter (R) | New seat | State Senator | 1965 |
| Minnesota 2 | John Kline (R) | Yes | U.S. Marine | 1947 |
| Nevada 3 | Jon Porter (R) | New seat | State Senator | 1955 |
| New Hampshire 1 | Jeb Bradley (R) | No | State Representative | 1952 |
| New Jersey 5 | Scott Garrett (R) | No | State Assemblyman | 1959 |
| New Mexico 2 | Steve Pearce (R) | No | State Representative | 1947 |
| New York 1 | Tim Bishop (D) | Yes | Provost | 1950 |
| North Carolina 1 | Frank Ballance (D) | No | State Senator | 1942 |
| North Carolina 13 | Brad Miller (D) | New seat | State Senator | 1953 |
| Ohio 3 | Mike Turner (R) | Yes | Mayor of Dayton | 1960 |
| Ohio 17 | Tim Ryan (D) | No | State Senator | 1973 |
| Pennsylvania 6 | Jim Gerlach (R) | New seat | State Senator | 1955 |
| Pennsylvania 18 | Tim Murphy (R) | New seat | State Senator | 1952 |
| South Carolina 3 | Gresham Barrett (R) | No | State Representative | 1961 |
| South Dakota at-large | Bill Janklow (R) | No | Governor of South Dakota | 1939 |
| Tennessee 4 | Lincoln Davis (D) | Yes | State Senator | 1943 |
| Tennessee 5 | Jim Cooper (D) | No | U.S. House of Representatives (Note: Previously elected to the 98th Congress, serving from 1983 to 1995 in the 4th district.) | 1954 |
| Tennessee 7 | Marsha Blackburn (R) | No | State Senator | 1952 |
| Texas 5 | Jeb Hensarling (R) | New seat | Campaign manager | 1957 |
| Texas 25 | Chris Bell (D) | No | Houston City Council | 1959 |
| Texas 26 | Michael C. Burgess | No | Gynecologist | 1950 |
| Texas 31 | John Carter | New seat | Judge | 1941 |
| Utah 1 | Rob Bishop | No | State House Speaker | 1951 |

==== Non-voting members ====
| District | Delegate | Switched party | Prior background | Birth year |
|---|---|---|---|---|
| Guam at-large | Madeleine Bordallo (D) | No | Lieutenant Governor of Guam | 1933 |

=== Took office during the 108th Congress ===
| District | Representative | Took office | Switched party | Prior background | Birth year |
|---|---|---|---|---|---|
| Texas 19 | Randy Neugebauer (R) | June 5, 2003 | No | City councilor | 1949 |
| Kentucky 6 | Ben Chandler (D) | February 17, 2004 | Yes | Attorney General of Kentucky | 1959 |
| South Dakota at-large | Stephanie Herseth (D) | June 1, 2004 | Yes | Law clerk | 1970 |
| North Carolina 1 | G. K. Butterfield (D) | July 20, 2004 | No | North Carolina Supreme Court | 1947 |

== See also ==
- List of United States representatives in the 108th Congress
- List of United States senators in the 108th Congress

== Notes ==
| Preceded by New members of the 107th Congress | New members of the 108th Congress; 2003–2005 | Succeeded by New members of the 109th Congress |
