= List of United States representatives in the 107th Congress =

This is a complete list of United States representatives during the 107th United States Congress listed by seniority.

As an historical article, the districts and party affiliations listed reflect those during the 107th Congress (January 3, 2001 – January 3, 2003). Seats and party affiliations on similar lists for other congresses will be different for certain members.

Seniority depends on the date on which members were sworn into office. Since many members are sworn in on the same day, subsequent ranking is based on previous congressional service of the individual and then by alphabetical order by the last name of the representative.

Committee chairmanship in the House is often associated with seniority. However, party leadership is typically not associated with seniority.

Note: The "*" indicates that the representative/delegate may have served one or more non-consecutive terms while in the House of Representatives of the United States Congress.

== U.S. House seniority list ==
U.S. House seniority
Rank	Representative	Party	District	Seniority date (Previous service, if any)	No.# of term(s)	Notes
1	John Dingell	D	MI-16	December 13, 1955	24th term	Dean of the House
2	John Conyers	D	MI-14	January 3, 1965	19th term	
3	Dave Obey	D	WI-07	April 1, 1969	17th term	
4	Phil Crane	R	IL-08	November 25, 1969	17th term	
5	Charles Rangel	D	NY-15	January 3, 1971	16th term	
6	Floyd Spence	R	SC-02	January 3, 1971	16th term	Died on August 16, 2001.
7	Bill Young	R	FL-10	January 3, 1971	16th term	
8	Benjamin Gilman	R	NY-20	January 3, 1973	15th term	Left the House in 2003.
9	Ralph Regula	R	OH-16	January 3, 1973	15th term	
10	Bud Shuster	R	PA-09	January 3, 1973	15th term	Resigned on February 3, 2001.
11	Joe Moakley	D	MA-09	January 3, 1973	15th term	Died on May 28, 2001.
12	Pete Stark	D	CA-13	January 3, 1973	15th term	
13	Don Young	R	AK-AL	March 6, 1973	15th term	
14	John Murtha	D	PA-12	February 5, 1974	15th term	
15	Henry Hyde	R	IL-06	January 3, 1975	14th term	
16	John LaFalce	D	NY-29	January 3, 1975	14th term	Left the House in 2003.
17	George Miller	D	CA-07	January 3, 1975	14th term	
18	Jim Oberstar	D	MN-08	January 3, 1975	14th term	
19	Henry Waxman	D	CA-29	January 3, 1975	14th term	
20	Ed Markey	D	MA-07	November 2, 1976	14th term	
21	David Bonior	D	MI-10	January 3, 1977	13th term	Left the House in 2003.
22	Norm Dicks	D	WA-06	January 3, 1977	13th term	
23	Dick Gephardt	D	MO-03	January 3, 1977	13th term	
24	Dale Kildee	D	MI-09	January 3, 1977	13th term	
25	Jim Leach	R	IA-01	January 3, 1977	13th term	
26	Nick Rahall	D	WV-03	January 3, 1977	13th term	
27	Ike Skelton	D	MO-04	January 3, 1977	13th term	
28	Bob Stump	R	AZ-03	January 3, 1977	13th term	Left the House in 2003.
29	Doug Bereuter	R	NE-01	January 3, 1979	12th term	
30	Tony P. Hall	D	OH-03	January 3, 1979	12th term	Resigned on September 9, 2002.
31	Martin Frost	D	TX-24	January 3, 1979	12th term	
32	Jerry Lewis	R	CA-40	January 3, 1979	12th term	
33	Bob Matsui	D	CA-05	January 3, 1979	12th term	
34	Martin Olav Sabo	D	MN-05	January 3, 1979	12th term	
35	Jim Sensenbrenner	R	WI-09	January 3, 1979	12th term	
36	Charles Stenholm	D	TX-17	January 3, 1979	12th term	
37	Bill Thomas	R	CA-21	January 3, 1979	12th term	
38	Tom Petri	R	WI-06	April 3, 1979	12th term	
39	Billy Tauzin	R	LA-03	May 22, 1980	12th term	
40	William J. Coyne	D	PA-14	January 3, 1981	11th term	Left the House in 2003.
41	David Dreier	R	CA-26	January 3, 1981	11th term	
42	Barney Frank	D	MA-04	January 3, 1981	11th term	
43	Ralph Hall	D	TX-04	January 3, 1981	11th term	
44	James V. Hansen	R	UT-01	January 3, 1981	11th term	Left the House in 2003.
45	Duncan L. Hunter	R	CA-52	January 3, 1981	11th term	
46	Tom Lantos	D	CA-12	January 3, 1981	11th term	
47	Hal Rogers	R	KY-05	January 3, 1981	11th term	
48	Marge Roukema	R	NJ-05	January 3, 1981	11th term	Left the House in 2003.
49	Clay Shaw	R	FL-22	January 3, 1981	11th term	
50	Joe Skeen	R	NM-02	January 3, 1981	11th term	Left the House in 2003.
51	Chris Smith	R	NJ-04	January 3, 1981	11th term	
52	Frank Wolf	R	VA-10	January 3, 1981	11th term	
53	Steny Hoyer	D	MD-05	May 19, 1981	11th term	
54	Mike Oxley	R	OH-04	June 25, 1981	11th term	
55	Howard Berman	D	CA-28	January 3, 1983	10th term	
56	Michael Bilirakis	R	FL-09	January 3, 1983	10th term	
57	Sherwood Boehlert	R	NY-23	January 3, 1983	10th term	
58	Robert A. Borski Jr.	D	PA-03	January 3, 1983	10th term	Left the House in 2003.
59	Rick Boucher	D	VA-09	January 3, 1983	10th term	
60	Dan Burton	R	IN-06	January 3, 1983	10th term	
61	Lane Evans	D	IL-17	January 3, 1983	10th term	
62	George Gekas	R	PA-17	January 3, 1983	10th term	Left the House in 2003.
63	Nancy Johnson	R	CT-06	January 3, 1983	10th term	
64	Marcy Kaptur	D	OH-09	January 3, 1983	10th term	
65	Sander Levin	D	MI-12	January 3, 1983	10th term	
66	Bill Lipinski	D	IL-03	January 3, 1983	10th term	
67	Alan Mollohan	D	WV-01	January 3, 1983	10th term	
68	Solomon P. Ortiz	D	TX-27	January 3, 1983	10th term	
69	Major Owens	D	NY-11	January 3, 1983	10th term	
70	Norman Sisisky	D	VA-04	January 3, 1983	10th term	Died on March 29, 2001.
71	John Spratt	D	SC-05	January 3, 1983	10th term	
72	Edolphus Towns	D	NY-10	January 3, 1983	10th term	
73	Gary Ackerman	D	NY-05	March 1, 1983	10th term	
74	Jerry Kleczka	D	WI-04	April 3, 1984	10th term	
75	Jim Saxton	R	NJ-03	November 6, 1984	10th term	
76	Dick Armey	R	TX-26	January 3, 1985	9th term	Left the House in 2003.
77	Joe Barton	R	TX-06	January 3, 1985	9th term	
78	Sonny Callahan	R	AL-01	January 3, 1985	9th term	Left the House in 2003.
79	Howard Coble	R	NC-06	January 3, 1985	9th term	
80	Larry Combest	R	TX-19	January 3, 1985	9th term	
81	Tom DeLay	R	TX-22	January 3, 1985	9th term	
82	Bart Gordon	D	TN-06	January 3, 1985	9th term	
83	Paul Kanjorski	D	PA-11	January 3, 1985	9th term	
84	Jim Kolbe	R	AZ-05	January 3, 1985	9th term	
85	James Traficant	D	OH-17	January 3, 1985	9th term	Resigned on July 24, 2002.
86	Pete Visclosky	D	IN-01	January 3, 1985	9th term	
87	Cass Ballenger	R	NC-10	November 4, 1986	9th term	
88	Richard Baker	R	LA-06	January 3, 1987	8th term	
89	Ben Cardin	D	MD-03	January 3, 1987	8th term	
90	Peter DeFazio	D	OR-04	January 3, 1987	8th term	
91	Elton Gallegly	R	CA-23	January 3, 1987	8th term	
92	Dennis Hastert	R	IL-14	January 3, 1987	8th term	Speaker of the House
93	Joel Hefley	R	CO-05	January 3, 1987	8th term	
94	Wally Herger	R	CA-02	January 3, 1987	8th term	
95	Amo Houghton	R	NY-31	January 3, 1987	8th term	
96	John Lewis	D	GA-05	January 3, 1987	8th term	
97	Connie Morella	R	MD-08	January 3, 1987	8th term	Left the House in 2003.
98	Thomas C. Sawyer	D	OH-14	January 3, 1987	8th term	Left the House in 2003.
99	Louise Slaughter	D	NY-28	January 3, 1987	8th term	
100	Lamar Smith	R	TX-21	January 3, 1987	8th term	
101	Fred Upton	R	MI-06	January 3, 1987	8th term	
102	Curt Weldon	R	PA-07	January 3, 1987	8th term	
103	Nancy Pelosi	D	CA-08	June 2, 1987	8th term	
104	Chris Shays	R	CT-04	August 18, 1987	8th term	
105	Bob Clement	D	TN-05	January 19, 1988	8th term	Left the House in 2003.
106	Jim McCrery	R	LA-04	April 16, 1988	8th term	
107	Jerry Costello	D	IL-12	August 9, 1988	8th term	
108	Jimmy Duncan	R	TN-02	November 8, 1988	8th term	
109	Frank Pallone	D	NJ-06	November 8, 1988	8th term	
110	Christopher Cox	R	CA-47	January 3, 1989	7th term	
111	Eliot Engel	D	NY-17	January 3, 1989	7th term	
112	Paul Gillmor	R	OH-05	January 3, 1989	7th term	
113	Porter Goss	R	FL-14	January 3, 1989	7th term	
114	Nita Lowey	D	NY-18	January 3, 1989	7th term	
115	Jim McDermott	D	WA-07	January 3, 1989	7th term	
116	Michael R. McNulty	D	NY-21	January 3, 1989	7th term	
117	Richard Neal	D	MA-02	January 3, 1989	7th term	
118	Donald M. Payne	D	NJ-10	January 3, 1989	7th term	
119	Dana Rohrabacher	R	CA-45	January 3, 1989	7th term	
120	Cliff Stearns	R	FL-06	January 3, 1989	7th term	
121	John S. Tanner	D	TN-08	January 3, 1989	7th term	
122	James T. Walsh	R	NY-25	January 3, 1989	7th term	
123	Ileana Ros-Lehtinen	R	FL-18	August 29, 1989	7th term	
124	Gary Condit	D	CA-18	September 12, 1989	7th term	Left the House in 2003.
125	Gene Taylor	D	MS-05	October 17, 1989	7th term	
126	José E. Serrano	D	NY-16	March 20, 1990	7th term	
127	Patsy Mink	D	HI-02	September 22, 1990; Previous service, 1965–1977.	13th term*	Died on September 28, 2002.
128	Rob Andrews	D	NJ-01	November 6, 1990	7th term	
129	Neil Abercrombie	D	HI-01	January 3, 1991; Previous service, 1986–1987.	7th term*	
130	John Boehner	R	OH-08	January 3, 1991	6th term	
131	Dave Camp	R	MI-04	January 3, 1991	6th term	
132	Bud Cramer	D	AL-05	January 3, 1991	6th term	
133	Duke Cunningham	R	CA-50	January 3, 1991	6th term	
134	Rosa DeLauro	D	CT-03	January 3, 1991	6th term	
135	John Doolittle	R	CA-04	January 3, 1991	6th term	
136	Cal Dooley	D	CA-20	January 3, 1991	6th term	
137	Chet Edwards	D	TX-11	January 3, 1991	6th term	
138	Wayne Gilchrest	R	MD-01	January 3, 1991	6th term	
139	Dave Hobson	R	OH-07	January 3, 1991	6th term	
140	William J. Jefferson	D	LA-02	January 3, 1991	6th term	
141	Jim Moran	D	VA-08	January 3, 1991	6th term	
142	Jim Nussle	R	IA-02	January 3, 1991	6th term	
143	Collin Peterson	D	MN-07	January 3, 1991	6th term	
144	Jim Ramstad	R	MN-03	January 3, 1991	6th term	
145	Tim Roemer	D	IN-03	January 3, 1991	6th term	Left the House in 2003.
146	Bernie Sanders	I	VT-AL	January 3, 1991	6th term	
147	Charles H. Taylor	R	NC-11	January 3, 1991	6th term	
148	Maxine Waters	D	CA-35	January 3, 1991	6th term	
149	Sam Johnson	R	TX-03	May 18, 1991	6th term	
150	John Olver	D	MA-01	June 4, 1991	6th term	
151	Ed Pastor	D	AZ-02	September 24, 1991	6th term	
152	Eva Clayton	D	NC-01	November 3, 1992	6th term	Left the House in 2003.
153	Jerry Nadler	D	NY-08	November 3, 1992	6th term	
154	Spencer Bachus	R	AL-06	January 3, 1993	5th term	
155	James A. Barcia	D	MI-05	January 3, 1993	5th term	Left the House in 2003.
156	Tom Barrett	D	WI-05	January 3, 1993	5th term	Left the House in 2003.
157	Roscoe Bartlett	R	MD-06	January 3, 1993	5th term	
158	Xavier Becerra	D	CA-30	January 3, 1993	5th term	
159	Sanford Bishop	D	GA-02	January 3, 1993	5th term	
160	Henry Bonilla	R	TX-23	January 3, 1993	5th term	
161	Corrine Brown	D	FL-03	January 3, 1993	5th term	
162	Sherrod Brown	D	OH-13	January 3, 1993	5th term	
163	Steve Buyer	R	IN-05	January 3, 1993	5th term	
164	Ken Calvert	R	CA-43	January 3, 1993	5th term	
165	Mike Castle	R	DE-AL	January 3, 1993	5th term	
166	Jim Clyburn	D	SC-06	January 3, 1993	5th term	
167	Mac Collins	R	GA-03	January 3, 1993	5th term	
168	Nathan Deal	R	GA-09	January 3, 1993	5th term	
169	Peter Deutsch	D	FL-20	January 3, 1993	5th term	
170	Lincoln Díaz-Balart	R	FL-21	January 3, 1993	5th term	
171	Jennifer Dunn	R	WA-08	January 3, 1993	5th term	
172	Anna Eshoo	D	CA-14	January 3, 1993	5th term	
173	Terry Everett	R	AL-02	January 3, 1993	5th term	
174	Bob Filner	D	CA-51	January 3, 1993	5th term	
175	Bob Goodlatte	R	VA-06	January 3, 1993	5th term	
176	Gene Green	D	TX-29	January 3, 1993	5th term	
177	James C. Greenwood	R	PA-08	January 3, 1993	5th term	
178	Luis Gutiérrez	D	IL-04	January 3, 1993	5th term	
179	Alcee Hastings	D	FL-23	January 3, 1993	5th term	
180	Earl Hilliard	D	AL-07	January 3, 1993	5th term	Left the House in 2003.
181	Maurice Hinchey	D	NY-26	January 3, 1993	5th term	
182	Pete Hoekstra	R	MI-02	January 3, 1993	5th term	
183	Tim Holden	D	PA-06	January 3, 1993	5th term	
184	Steve Horn	R	CA-38	January 3, 1993	5th term	Left the House in 2003.
185	Ernest Istook	R	OK-05	January 3, 1993	5th term	
186	Eddie Bernice Johnson	D	TX-30	January 3, 1993	5th term	
187	Peter T. King	R	NY-03	January 3, 1993	5th term	
188	Jack Kingston	R	GA-01	January 3, 1993	5th term	
189	Joe Knollenberg	R	MI-11	January 3, 1993	5th term	
190	John Linder	R	GA-11	January 3, 1993	5th term	
191	Carolyn Maloney	D	NY-14	January 3, 1993	5th term	
192	Don Manzullo	R	IL-16	January 3, 1993	5th term	
193	John M. McHugh	R	NY-24	January 3, 1993	5th term	
194	Scott McInnis	R	CO-03	January 3, 1993	5th term	
195	Buck McKeon	R	CA-25	January 3, 1993	5th term	
196	Cynthia McKinney	D	GA-04	January 3, 1993	5th term	Left the House in 2003.
197	Marty Meehan	D	MA-05	January 3, 1993	5th term	
198	Carrie Meek	D	FL-17	January 3, 1993	5th term	Left the House in 2003.
199	Bob Menendez	D	NJ-13	January 3, 1993	5th term	
200	John Mica	R	FL-07	January 3, 1993	5th term	
201	Dan Miller	R	FL-13	January 3, 1993	5th term	Left the House in 2003.
202	Richard Pombo	R	CA-11	January 3, 1993	5th term	
203	Earl Pomeroy	D	ND-AL	January 3, 1993	5th term	
204	Deborah Pryce	R	OH-15	January 3, 1993	5th term	
205	Jack Quinn	R	NY-30	January 3, 1993	5th term	
206	Lucille Roybal-Allard	D	CA-33	January 3, 1993	5th term	
207	Ed Royce	R	CA-39	January 3, 1993	5th term	
208	Bobby Rush	D	IL-01	January 3, 1993	5th term	
209	Bobby Scott	D	VA-03	January 3, 1993	5th term	
210	Nick Smith	R	MI-07	January 3, 1993	5th term	
211	Bart Stupak	D	MI-01	January 3, 1993	5th term	
212	Karen Thurman	D	FL-05	January 3, 1993	5th term	Left the House in 2003.
213	Nydia Velázquez	D	NY-12	January 3, 1993	5th term	
214	Mel Watt	D	NC-12	January 3, 1993	5th term	
215	Lynn Woolsey	D	CA-06	January 3, 1993	5th term	
216	Albert Wynn	D	MD-04	January 3, 1993	5th term	
217	Bennie Thompson	D	MS-02	April 13, 1993	5th term	
218	Rob Portman	R	OH-02	May 4, 1993	5th term	
219	Sam Farr	D	CA-17	June 8, 1993	5th term	
220	Vern Ehlers	R	MI-03	December 7, 1993	5th term	
221	Frank Lucas	R	OK-06	May 10, 1994	5th term	
222	Ron Lewis	R	KY-02	May 24, 1994	5th term	
223	Steve Largent	R	OK-01	November 29, 1994	5th term	Resigned on February 15, 2002.
224	John Baldacci	D	ME-02	January 3, 1995	4th term	Left the House in 2003.
225	Charles Bass	R	NH-02	January 3, 1995	4th term	
226	Bob Barr	R	GA-07	January 3, 1995	4th term	Left the House in 2003.
227	Ken Bentsen Jr.	D	TX-25	January 3, 1995	4th term	Left the House in 2003.
228	Ed Bryant	R	TN-07	January 3, 1995	4th term	Left the House in 2003.
229	Richard Burr	R	NC-05	January 3, 1995	4th term	
230	Steve Chabot	R	OH-01	January 3, 1995	4th term	
231	Saxby Chambliss	R	GA-08	January 3, 1995	4th term	Left the House in 2003.
232	Barbara Cubin	R	WY-AL	January 3, 1995	4th term	
233	Tom Davis	R	VA-11	January 3, 1995	4th term	
234	Lloyd Doggett	D	TX-10	January 3, 1995	4th term	
235	Mike Doyle	D	PA-18	January 3, 1995	4th term	
236	Bob Ehrlich	R	MD-02	January 3, 1995	4th term	Left the House in 2003.
237	Phil English	R	PA-21	January 3, 1995	4th term	
238	Chaka Fattah	D	PA-02	January 3, 1995	4th term	
239	Mark Foley	R	FL-16	January 3, 1995	4th term	
240	Rodney Frelinghuysen	R	NJ-11	January 3, 1995	4th term	
241	Greg Ganske	R	IA-04	January 3, 1995	4th term	Left the House in 2003.
242	Lindsey Graham	R	SC-03	January 3, 1995	4th term	Left the House in 2003.
243	Gil Gutknecht	R	MN-01	January 3, 1995	4th term	
244	Doc Hastings	R	WA-04	January 3, 1995	4th term	
245	J. D. Hayworth	R	AZ-06	January 3, 1995	4th term	
246	Van Hilleary	R	TN-04	January 3, 1995	4th term	Left the House in 2003.
247	John Hostettler	R	IN-08	January 3, 1995	4th term	
248	Sheila Jackson Lee	D	TX-18	January 3, 1995	4th term	
249	Walter B. Jones Jr.	R	NC-03	January 3, 1995	4th term	
250	Sue W. Kelly	R	NY-19	January 3, 1995	4th term	
251	Patrick J. Kennedy	D	RI-01	January 3, 1995	4th term	
252	Ray LaHood	R	IL-18	January 3, 1995	4th term	
253	Tom Latham	R	IA-05	January 3, 1995	4th term	
254	Steve LaTourette	R	OH-19	January 3, 1995	4th term	
255	Frank LoBiondo	R	NJ-02	January 3, 1995	4th term	
256	Zoe Lofgren	D	CA-16	January 3, 1995	4th term	
257	Bill Luther	D	MN-06	January 3, 1995	4th term	Left the House in 2003.
258	Frank Mascara	D	PA-20	January 3, 1995	4th term	Left the House in 2003.
259	Karen McCarthy	D	MO-05	January 3, 1995	4th term	
260	Sue Myrick	R	NC-09	January 3, 1995	4th term	
261	George Nethercutt	R	WA-05	January 3, 1995	4th term	
262	Bob Ney	R	OH-18	January 3, 1995	4th term	
263	Charlie Norwood	R	GA-10	January 3, 1995	4th term	
264	George Radanovich	R	CA-19	January 3, 1995	4th term	
265	Lynn N. Rivers	D	MI-13	January 3, 1995	4th term	Left the House in 2003.
266	Joe Scarborough	R	FL-01	January 3, 1995	4th term	Resigned on September 5, 2001.
267	John Shadegg	R	AZ-04	January 3, 1995	4th term	
268	Mark Souder	R	IN-04	January 3, 1995	4th term	
269	Mac Thornberry	R	TX-13	January 3, 1995	4th term	
270	Todd Tiahrt	R	KS-04	January 3, 1995	4th term	
271	Zach Wamp	R	TN-03	January 3, 1995	4th term	
272	J. C. Watts	R	OK-04	January 3, 1995	4th term	Left the House in 2003.
273	Dave Weldon	R	FL-15	January 3, 1995	4th term	
274	Jerry Weller	R	IL-11	January 3, 1995	4th term	
275	Ed Whitfield	R	KY-01	January 3, 1995	4th term	
276	Roger Wicker	R	MS-01	January 3, 1995	4th term	
277	Jesse Jackson Jr.	D	IL-02	December 12, 1995	4th term	
278	Juanita Millender-McDonald	D	CA-37	March 26, 1996	4th term	
279	Elijah Cummings	D	MD-07	April 16, 1996	4th term	
280	Earl Blumenauer	D	OR-03	May 21, 1996	4th term	
281	Jo Ann Emerson	R	MO-08	November 5, 1996	4th term	
282	Jim Ryun	R	KS-02	November 27, 1996	4th term	
283	Robert Aderholt	R	AL-04	January 3, 1997	3rd term	
284	Tom Allen	D	ME-01	January 3, 1997	3rd term	
285	Rod Blagojevich	D	IL-05	January 3, 1997	3rd term	Left the House in 2003.
286	Marion Berry	D	AR-01	January 3, 1997	3rd term	
287	Roy Blunt	R	MO-07	January 3, 1997	3rd term	
288	Leonard Boswell	D	IA-03	January 3, 1997	3rd term	
289	Allen Boyd	D	FL-02	January 3, 1997	3rd term	
290	Kevin Brady	R	TX-08	January 3, 1997	3rd term	
291	Chris Cannon	R	UT-03	January 3, 1997	3rd term	
292	Julia Carson	D	IN-10	January 3, 1997	3rd term	
293	John Cooksey	R	LA-05	January 3, 1997	3rd term	Left the House in 2003.
294	Danny K. Davis	D	IL-07	January 3, 1997	3rd term	
295	Jim Davis	D	FL-11	January 3, 1997	3rd term	
296	Diana DeGette	D	CO-01	January 3, 1997	3rd term	
297	Bill Delahunt	D	MA-10	January 3, 1997	3rd term	
298	Bob Etheridge	D	NC-02	January 3, 1997	3rd term	
299	Harold Ford Jr.	D	TN-09	January 3, 1997	3rd term	
300	Jim Gibbons	R	NV-02	January 3, 1997	3rd term	
301	Virgil Goode	I	VA-05	January 3, 1997	3rd term	Switched to Republican on August 1, 2002.
302	Kay Granger	R	TX-12	January 3, 1997	3rd term	
303	Rubén Hinojosa	D	TX-15	January 3, 1997	3rd term	
304	Darlene Hooley	D	OR-05	January 3, 1997	3rd term	
305	Kenny Hulshof	R	MO-09	January 3, 1997	3rd term	
306	Asa Hutchinson	R	AR-03	January 3, 1997	3rd term	Resigned on August 6, 2001
307	Bill Jenkins	R	TN-01	January 3, 1997	3rd term	
308	Chris John	D	LA-07	January 3, 1997	3rd term	
309	Carolyn Cheeks Kilpatrick	D	MI-15	January 3, 1997	3rd term	
310	Ron Kind	D	WI-03	January 3, 1997	3rd term	
311	Dennis Kucinich	D	OH-10	January 3, 1997	3rd term	
312	Nick Lampson	D	TX-09	January 3, 1997	3rd term	
313	James H. Maloney	D	CT-05	January 3, 1997	3rd term	Left the House in 2003.
314	Carolyn McCarthy	D	NY-04	January 3, 1997	3rd term	
315	Jim McGovern	D	MA-03	January 3, 1997	3rd term	
316	Mike McIntyre	D	NC-07	January 3, 1997	3rd term	
317	Jerry Moran	R	KS-01	January 3, 1997	3rd term	
318	Anne Northup	R	KY-03	January 3, 1997	3rd term	
319	Bill Pascrell	D	NJ-08	January 3, 1997	3rd term	
320	Ron Paul	R	TX-14	January 3, 1997; Previous service, 1976–1977 and 1979–1985.	7th term**	
321	John E. Peterson	R	PA-05	January 3, 1997	3rd term	
322	Chip Pickering	R	MS-03	January 3, 1997	3rd term	
323	Joe Pitts	R	PA-16	January 3, 1997	3rd term	
324	David Price	D	NC-04	January 3, 1997; Previous service, 1987–1995.	6th term*	
325	Silvestre Reyes	D	TX-16	January 3, 1997	3rd term	
326	Bob Riley	R	AL-03	January 3, 1997	3rd term	Left the House in 2003.
327	Steve Rothman	D	NJ-09	January 3, 1997	3rd term	
328	Loretta Sanchez	D	CA-46	January 3, 1997	3rd term	
329	Max Sandlin	D	TX-01	January 3, 1997	3rd term	
330	Bob Schaffer	R	CO-04	January 3, 1997	3rd term	Left the House in 2003.
331	Pete Sessions	R	TX-05	January 3, 1997	3rd term	
332	Brad Sherman	D	CA-24	January 3, 1997	3rd term	
333	John Shimkus	R	IL-20	January 3, 1997	3rd term	
334	Adam Smith	D	WA-09	January 3, 1997	3rd term	
335	Vic Snyder	D	AR-02	January 3, 1997	3rd term	
336	Ted Strickland	D	OH-06	January 3, 1997; Previous service, 1993–1995.	4th term*	
337	John E. Sununu	R	NH-01	January 3, 1997	3rd term	Left the House in 2003.
338	Ellen Tauscher	D	CA-10	January 3, 1997	3rd term	
339	John Thune	R	SD-AL	January 3, 1997	3rd term	Left the House in 2003.
340	John F. Tierney	D	MA-06	January 3, 1997	3rd term	
341	Jim Turner	D	TX-02	January 3, 1997	3rd term	
342	Wes Watkins	R	OK-03	January 3, 1997; Previous service, 1977–1991.	10th term*	Left the House in 2003.
343	Robert Wexler	D	FL-19	January 3, 1997	3rd term	
344	Ciro Rodriguez	D	TX-28	April 12, 1997	3rd term	
345	Vito Fossella	R	NY-13	November 4, 1997	3rd term	
346	Gregory Meeks	D	NY-06	February 3, 1998	3rd term	
347	Lois Capps	D	CA-22	March 10, 1998	3rd term	
348	Mary Bono	R	CA-44	April 7, 1998	3rd term	
349	Barbara Lee	D	CA-09	April 7, 1998	3rd term	
350	Bob Brady	D	PA-01	May 19, 1998	3rd term	
351	Heather Wilson	R	NM-01	June 23, 1998	3rd term	
352	Brian Baird	D	WA-03	January 3, 1999	2nd term	
353	Tammy Baldwin	D	WI-02	January 3, 1999	2nd term	
354	Shelley Berkley	D	NV-01	January 3, 1999	2nd term	
355	Judy Biggert	R	IL-13	January 3, 1999	2nd term	
356	Mike Capuano	D	MA-08	January 3, 1999	2nd term	
357	Joe Crowley	D	NY-07	January 3, 1999	2nd term	
358	Jim DeMint	R	SC-04	January 3, 1999	2nd term	
359	Ernie Fletcher	R	KY-06	January 3, 1999	2nd term	
360	Charlie Gonzalez	D	TX-20	January 3, 1999	2nd term	
361	Mark Green	R	WI-08	January 3, 1999	2nd term	
362	Robin Hayes	R	NC-08	January 3, 1999	2nd term	
363	Baron Hill	D	IN-09	January 3, 1999	2nd term	
364	Joe Hoeffel	D	PA-13	January 3, 1999	2nd term	
365	Rush Holt Jr.	D	NJ-12	January 3, 1999	2nd term	
366	Jay Inslee	D	WA-01	January 3, 1999; Previous service, 1993–1995.	3rd term*	
367	Stephanie Tubbs Jones	D	OH-11	January 3, 1999	2nd term	
368	John B. Larson	D	CT-01	January 3, 1999	2nd term	
369	Ken Lucas	D	KY-04	January 3, 1999	2nd term	
370	Gary Miller	R	CA-41	January 3, 1999	2nd term	
371	Dennis Moore	D	KS-03	January 3, 1999	2nd term	
372	Grace Napolitano	D	CA-34	January 3, 1999	2nd term	
373	Doug Ose	R	CA-03	January 3, 1999	2nd term	
374	David D. Phelps	D	IL-19	January 3, 1999	2nd term	Left the House in 2003.
375	Thomas M. Reynolds	R	NY-27	January 3, 1999	2nd term	
376	Paul Ryan	R	WI-01	January 3, 1999	2nd term	
377	Jan Schakowsky	D	IL-09	January 3, 1999	2nd term	
378	Don Sherwood	R	PA-10	January 3, 1999	2nd term	
379	Ronnie Shows	D	MS-04	January 3, 1999	2nd term	Left the House in 2003.
380	Mike Simpson	R	ID-02	January 3, 1999	2nd term	
381	John E. Sweeney	R	NY-22	January 3, 1999	2nd term	
382	Tom Tancredo	R	CO-06	January 3, 1999	2nd term	
383	Lee Terry	R	NE-02	January 3, 1999	2nd term	
384	Mike Thompson	D	CA-01	January 3, 1999	2nd term	
385	Pat Toomey	R	PA-15	January 3, 1999	2nd term	
386	Mark Udall	D	CO-02	January 3, 1999	2nd term	
387	Tom Udall	D	NM-03	January 3, 1999	2nd term	
388	Greg Walden	R	OR-02	January 3, 1999	2nd term	
389	Anthony Weiner	D	NY-09	January 3, 1999	2nd term	
390	David Wu	D	OR-01	January 3, 1999	2nd term	
391	Johnny Isakson	R	GA-06	February 23, 1999	2nd term	
392	David Vitter	R	LA-01	May 29, 1999	2nd term	
393	Joe Baca	D	CA-42	November 16, 1999	2nd term	
394	Todd Akin	R	MO-02	January 3, 2001	1st term	
395	Henry E. Brown Jr.	R	SC-01	January 3, 2001	1st term	
396	Eric Cantor	R	VA-07	January 3, 2001	1st term	
397	Shelley Moore Capito	R	WV-02	January 3, 2001	1st term	
398	Brad Carson	D	OK-02	January 3, 2001	1st term	
399	Lacy Clay	D	MO-01	January 3, 2001	1st term	
400	Ander Crenshaw	R	FL-04	January 3, 2001	1st term	
401	John Culberson	R	TX-07	January 3, 2001	1st term	
402	Jo Ann Davis	R	VA-01	January 3, 2001	1st term	
403	Susan Davis	D	CA-49	January 3, 2001	1st term	
404	Mike Ferguson	R	NJ-07	January 3, 2001	1st term	
405	Jeff Flake	R	AZ-01	January 3, 2001	1st term	
406	Sam Graves	R	MO-06	January 3, 2001	1st term	
407	Felix Grucci	R	NY-01	January 3, 2001	1st term	Left the House in 2003.
408	Jane Harman	D	CA-36	January 3, 2001; Previous service, 1993–1999.	4th term*	
409	Melissa Hart	R	PA-04	January 3, 2001	1st term	
410	Mike Honda	D	CA-15	January 3, 2001	1st term	
411	Steve Israel	D	NY-02	January 3, 2001	1st term	
412	Darrell Issa	R	CA-48	January 3, 2001	1st term	
413	Tim Johnson	R	IL-15	January 3, 2001	1st term	
414	Ric Keller	R	FL-08	January 3, 2001	1st term	
415	Mark Kennedy	R	MN-02	January 3, 2001	1st term	
416	Brian D. Kerns	R	IN-07	January 3, 2001	1st term	Left the House in 2003.
417	Mark Kirk	R	IL-10	January 3, 2001	1st term	
418	James Langevin	D	RI-02	January 3, 2001	1st term	
419	Rick Larsen	D	WA-02	January 3, 2001	1st term	
420	Jim Matheson	D	UT-02	January 3, 2001	1st term	
421	Betty McCollum	D	MN-04	January 3, 2001	1st term	
422	Tom Osborne	R	NE-03	January 3, 2001	1st term	
423	Mike Pence	R	IN-02	January 3, 2001	1st term	
424	Todd Platts	R	PA-19	January 3, 2001	1st term	
425	Butch Otter	R	ID-01	January 3, 2001	1st term	
426	Adam Putnam	R	FL-12	January 3, 2001	1st term	
427	Denny Rehberg	R	MT-AL	January 3, 2001	1st term	
428	Mike Rogers	R	MI-08	January 3, 2001	1st term	
429	Mike Ross	D	AR-04	January 3, 2001	1st term	
430	Adam Schiff	D	CA-27	January 3, 2001	1st term	
431	Ed Schrock	R	VA-02	January 3, 2001	1st term	
432	Rob Simmons	R	CT-02	January 3, 2001	1st term	
433	Hilda Solis	D	CA-31	January 3, 2001	1st term	
434	Pat Tiberi	R	OH-12	January 3, 2001	1st term	
	Bill Shuster	R	PA-09	May 15, 2001	1st term	
435	Diane Watson	D	CA-32	June 5, 2001	1st term	
	Randy Forbes	R	VA-04	June 19, 2001	1st term	
	Stephen Lynch	D	MA-09	October 16, 2001	1st term	
	Jeff Miller	R	FL-01	October 16, 2001	1st term	
	John Boozman	R	AR-03	November 20, 2001	1st term	
	Joe Wilson	R	SC-02	December 18, 2001	1st term	
	John Sullivan	R	OK-01	February 15, 2002	1st term	
	Ed Case	D	HI-02	November 30, 2002	1st term	

== Delegates ==
Rank	Delegate	Party	District	Seniority date (Previous service, if any)	No.# of term(s)	Notes
1	Eni Faleomavaega	D	AS	January 3, 1989	7th term	
2	Eleanor Holmes Norton	D	DC	January 3, 1991	6th term	
3	Robert A. Underwood	D	GU	January 3, 1993	5th term	
4	Donna Christian-Christensen	D	VI	January 3, 1997	3rd term	
5	Aníbal Acevedo Vilá	D	PR	January 3, 2001	1st term	

== See also ==
- 107th United States Congress
- List of United States congressional districts
- List of United States senators in the 107th Congress
