= List of United States senators in the 108th Congress =

This is a complete list of United States senators during the 108th United States Congress listed by seniority from January 3, 2003, to January 3, 2005. In this congress, Jeff Bingaman (D-New Mexico) was the most senior junior senator and Mark Dayton (D-Minnesota) was the most junior senior senator

Order of service is based on the commencement of the senator's first term. Behind this is former service as a senator (only giving the senator seniority within their new incoming class), service as vice president, a House member, a cabinet secretary, or a state governor. The final factor is the population of the senator's state.

Senators who were sworn in during the middle of the two-year congressional term (up until the last senator who was not sworn in early after winning the November 2004 election) are listed at the end of the list with no number.

== Terms of service ==
Class	Terms of service of senators that expired in years
Class 3	Terms of service of senators that expired in 2005 (AK, AL, AR, AZ, CA, CO, CT, FL, GA, HI, IA, ID, IL, IN, KS, KY, LA, MD, MO, NC, ND, NV, NH, NY, OH, OK, OR, PA, SC, SD, UT, VT, WA, and WI.)
Class 1	Terms of service of senators that expired in 2007 (AZ, CA, CT, DE, FL, HI, IN, MA, MD, ME, MI, MN, MO, MS, MT, ND, NE, NJ, NM, NV, NY, OH, PA, RI, TN, TX, UT, VA, VT, WA, WV, WI, and WY.)
Class 2	Terms of service of senators that expired in 2009 (AK, AL, AR, CO, DE, GA, IA, ID, IL, KS, KY, LA, MA, ME, MI, MN, MS, MT, NC, NE, NH, NJ, NM, OK, OR, RI, SC, SD, TN, TX, VA, WV, and WY.)

== U.S. Senate seniority list ==
U.S. Senate seniority
Rank	Senator (party-state)	Seniority date	Other factors
1	Robert Byrd (D-WV)	January 3, 1959	
2	Ted Kennedy (D-MA)	November 7, 1962	
3	Daniel Inouye (D-HI)	January 3, 1963	
4	Fritz Hollings (D-SC)	November 9, 1966	
5	Ted Stevens (R-AK)	December 24, 1968	
6	Pete Domenici (R-NM)	January 3, 1973	New Mexico 37th in population (1970)
7	Joe Biden (D-DE)	January 3, 1973	Delaware 46th in population (1970)
8	Patrick Leahy (D-VT)	January 3, 1975	
9	Paul Sarbanes (D-MD)	January 3, 1977	Former representative
10	Richard Lugar (R-IN)	January 3, 1977	Indiana 11th in population (1970)
11	Orrin Hatch (R-UT)	January 3, 1977	Utah 36th in population (1970)
12	Max Baucus (D-MT)	December 15, 1978	
13	Thad Cochran (R-MS)	December 27, 1978	
14	John Warner (R-VA)	January 2, 1979	
15	Carl Levin (D-MI)	January 3, 1979	
16	Chris Dodd (D-CT)	January 3, 1981	Former representative (6 years) - Connecticut 24th in population (1970)
17	Chuck Grassley (R-IA)	January 3, 1981	Former representative (6 years) - Iowa 25th in population (1970)
18	Arlen Specter (R-PA)	January 3, 1981	Pennsylvania 3rd in population (1970)
19	Don Nickles (R-OK)	January 3, 1981	Oklahoma 27th in population (1970)
20	Jeff Bingaman (D-NM)	January 3, 1983	
21	John Kerry (D-MA)	January 2, 1985	
22	Tom Harkin (D-IA)	January 3, 1985	Former representative
23	Mitch McConnell (R-KY)	January 3, 1985	
24	Jay Rockefeller (D-WV)	January 15, 1985	
25	John Breaux (D-LA)	January 3, 1987	Former representative (14 years)
26	Barbara Mikulski (D-MD)	January 3, 1987	Former representative (10 years)
27	Richard Shelby (R-AL)	January 3, 1987	Former representative (8 years) - Alabama 22nd in population (1980)
28	Tom Daschle (D-SD)	January 3, 1987	Former representative (8 years) - South Dakota 45th in population (1980)
29	John McCain (R-AZ)	January 3, 1987	Former representative (4 years) - Arizona 29th in population (1980)
30	Harry Reid (D-NV)	January 3, 1987	Former representative (4 years) - Nevada 43rd in population (1980)
31	Bob Graham (D-FL)	January 3, 1987	Former governor - Florida 4th in population (1980)
32	Kit Bond (R-MO)	January 3, 1987	Former governor - Missouri 15th in population (1980)
33	Kent Conrad (D-ND)	January 3, 1987	
34	Trent Lott (R-MS)	January 3, 1989	Former representative (16 years)
35	Jim Jeffords (I-VT)	January 3, 1989	Former representative (14 years)
36	Herb Kohl (D-WI)	January 3, 1989	Wisconsin 16th in population (1980)
37	Joe Lieberman (D-CT)	January 3, 1989	Connecticut 25th in population (1980)
38	Conrad Burns (R-MT)	January 3, 1989	Montana 44th in population (1980)
39	Daniel Akaka (D-HI)	May 16, 1990	
40	Larry Craig (R-ID)	January 3, 1991	
41	Dianne Feinstein (D-CA)	November 10, 1992	
42	Byron Dorgan (D-ND)	December 15, 1992	
43	Barbara Boxer (D-CA)	January 3, 1993	Former representative (10 years)
44	Judd Gregg (R-NH)	January 3, 1993	Former representative (8 years)
45	Ben Nighthorse Campbell (R-CO)	January 3, 1993	Former representative (6 years)
46	Russ Feingold (D-WI)	January 3, 1993	Wisconsin 16th in population (1990)
47	Patty Murray (D-WA)	January 3, 1993	Washington 18th in population (1990)
48	Bob Bennett (R-UT)	January 3, 1993	Utah 35th in population (1990)
49	Kay Bailey Hutchison (R-TX)	June 14, 1993	
50	Jim Inhofe (R-OK)	November 17, 1994	
51	Olympia Snowe (R-ME)	January 3, 1995	Former representative (16 years)
52	Mike DeWine (R-OH)	January 3, 1995	Former representative (8 years) - Ohio 7th in population (1990)
53	Jon Kyl (R-AZ)	January 3, 1995	Former representative (8 years) - Arizona 24th in population (1990)
54	Craig L. Thomas (R-WY)	January 3, 1995	Former representative (6 years)
55	Rick Santorum (R-PA)	January 3, 1995	Former representative (4 years)
56	Bill Frist (R-TN)	January 3, 1995	
57	Ron Wyden (D-OR)	February 6, 1996	
58	Sam Brownback (R-KS)	November 7, 1996	
59	Pat Roberts (R-KS)	January 3, 1997	Former representative (16 years)
60	Dick Durbin (D-IL)	January 3, 1997	Former representative (14 years)
61	Tim Johnson (D-SD)	January 3, 1997	Former representative (10 years)
62	Wayne Allard (R-CO)	January 3, 1997	Former representative (6 years) - Colorado 26th in population (1990)
63	Jack Reed (D-RI)	January 3, 1997	Former representative (6 years) - Rhode Island 43rd in population (1990)
64	Mary Landrieu (D-LA)	January 3, 1997	Louisiana 21st in population (1990)
65	Jeff Sessions (R-AL)	January 3, 1997	Alabama 22nd in population (1990)
66	Gordon H. Smith (R-OR)	January 3, 1997	Oregon 29th in population (1990)
67	Chuck Hagel (R-NE)	January 3, 1997	Nebraska 36th in population (1990)
68	Susan Collins (R-ME)	January 3, 1997	Maine 38th in population (1990)
69	Mike Enzi (R-WY)	January 3, 1997	Wyoming 50th in population (1990)
70	Chuck Schumer (D-NY)	January 3, 1999	Former representative (18 years)
71	Jim Bunning (R-KY)	January 3, 1999	Former representative (12 years)
72	Mike Crapo (R-ID)	January 3, 1999	Former representative (6 years)
73	Blanche Lincoln (D-AR)	January 3, 1999	Former representative (4 years)
74	George Voinovich (R-OH)	January 3, 1999	Former governor - Ohio 7th in population (1990)
75	Evan Bayh (D-IN)	January 3, 1999	Former governor - Indiana 14th in population (1990)
76	Peter Fitzgerald (R-IL)	January 3, 1999	Illinois 6th in population (1990)
77	John Edwards (D-NC)	January 3, 1999	North Carolina 10th in population (1990)
78	Lincoln Chafee (R-RI)	November 4, 1999	
79	Zell Miller (D-GA)	July 27, 2000	
80	Bill Nelson (D-FL)	January 3, 2001	Former representative (12 years)
81	Tom Carper (D-DE)	January 3, 2001	Former representative (10 years)
82	Debbie Stabenow (D-MI)	January 3, 2001	Former representative (4 years) - Michigan 8th in population (1990)
83	John Ensign (R-NV)	January 3, 2001	Former representative (4 years) - Nevada 39th in population (1990)
84	George Allen (R-VA)	January 3, 2001	Former representative (2 years) - Former governor
85	Maria Cantwell (D-WA)	January 3, 2001	Former representative (2 years)
86	Ben Nelson (D-NE)	January 3, 2001	Former governor
87	Hillary Clinton (D-NY)	January 3, 2001	New York 2nd in population (1990)
88	Jon Corzine (D-NJ)	January 3, 2001	New Jersey 9th in population (1990)
89	Mark Dayton (D-MN)	January 3, 2001	Minnesota 20th in population (1990)
90	Jim Talent (R-MO)	November 25, 2002	
91	John Cornyn (R-TX)	December 2, 2002	
92	Lisa Murkowski (R-AK)	December 20, 2002	
93	Frank Lautenberg (D-NJ)	January 3, 2003	Previously a senator
94	Saxby Chambliss (R-GA)	January 3, 2003	Former representative (8 years) - Georgia 9th in population (2000)
95	Lindsey Graham (R-SC)	January 3, 2003	Former representative (8 years) - South Carolina 24th in population (2000)
96	John E. Sununu (R-NH)	January 3, 2003	Former representative (6 years)
97	Lamar Alexander (R-TN)	January 3, 2003	Former cabinet secretary, former governor
98	Elizabeth Dole (R-NC)	January 3, 2003	Former cabinet secretary
99	Norm Coleman (R-MN)	January 3, 2003	Minnesota 21st in population (2000)
100	Mark Pryor (D-AR)	January 3, 2003	Arkansas 32nd in population (2000)

The most senior senators by class were Robert Byrd (D-West Virginia) from Class 1, Ted Stevens (R-Alaska) from Class 2, and Daniel Inouye (D-Hawaii) from Class 3.

== See also ==
- 108th United States Congress
- List of United States representatives in the 108th Congress
