= List of United States representatives in the 108th Congress =

This is a complete list of United States representatives during the 108th United States Congress listed by seniority.

As an historical article, the districts and party affiliations listed reflect those during the 108th Congress (January 3, 2003 – January 3, 2005). Seats and party affiliations on similar lists for other congresses will be different for certain members.

Seniority depends on the date on which members were sworn into office. Since many members are sworn in on the same day, subsequent ranking is based on previous congressional service of the individual and then by alphabetical order by the last name of the representative.

Committee chairmanship in the House is often associated with seniority. However, party leadership is typically not associated with seniority.

Note: The "*" indicates that the representative/delegate may have served one or more non-consecutive terms while in the House of Representatives of the United States Congress.

== U.S. House seniority list ==
U.S. House seniority
Rank	Representative	Party	District	Seniority date (Previous service, if any)	No.# of term(s)	Notes
1	John Dingell	D	MI-15	December 13, 1955	25th term	Dean of the House
2	John Conyers	D	MI-14	January 3, 1965	20th term	
3	Dave Obey	D	WI-07	April 1, 1969	18th term	
4	Phil Crane	R	IL-08	November 25, 1969	18th term	Left the House in 2005.
5	Charles Rangel	D	NY-15	January 3, 1971	17th term	
6	Bill Young	R	FL-10	January 3, 1971	17th term	
7	Ralph Regula	R	OH-16	January 3, 1973	16th term	
8	Pete Stark	D	CA-13	January 3, 1973	16th term	
9	Don Young	R	AK-AL	March 6, 1973	16th term	
10	John Murtha	D	PA-12	February 5, 1974	16th term	
11	Henry Hyde	R	IL-06	January 3, 1975	15th term	
12	George Miller	D	CA-07	January 3, 1975	15th term	
13	Jim Oberstar	D	MN-08	January 3, 1975	15th term	
14	Henry Waxman	D	CA-30	January 3, 1975	15th term	
15	Ed Markey	D	MA-07	November 2, 1976	15th term	
16	Norm Dicks	D	WA-06	January 3, 1977	14th term	
17	Dick Gephardt	D	MO-03	January 3, 1977	14th term	Left the House in 2005.
18	Dale Kildee	D	MI-05	January 3, 1977	14th term	
19	Jim Leach	R	IA-02	January 3, 1977	14th term	
20	Nick Rahall	D	WV-03	January 3, 1977	14th term	
21	Ike Skelton	D	MO-04	January 3, 1977	14th term	
22	Doug Bereuter	R	NE-01	January 3, 1979	13th term	Resigned on August 31, 2004.
23	Martin Frost	D	TX-24	January 3, 1979	13th term	Left the House in 2005.
24	Jerry Lewis	R	CA-41	January 3, 1979	13th term	
25	Bob Matsui	D	CA-05	January 3, 1979	13th term	Died on January 1, 2005.
26	Martin Olav Sabo	D	MN-05	January 3, 1979	13th term	
27	Jim Sensenbrenner	R	WI-05	January 3, 1979	13th term	
28	Charles Stenholm	D	TX-17	January 3, 1979	13th term	Left the House in 2005.
29	Bill Thomas	R	CA-22	January 3, 1979	13th term	
30	Tom Petri	R	WI-06	April 3, 1979	13th term	
31	Billy Tauzin	R	LA-03	May 22, 1980	13th term	Left the House in 2005.
32	David Dreier	R	CA-26	January 3, 1981	12th term	
33	Barney Frank	D	MA-04	January 3, 1981	12th term	
34	Ralph Hall	D	TX-04	January 3, 1981	12th term	Switched to Republican on January 5, 2004.
35	Duncan L. Hunter	R	CA-52	January 3, 1981	12th term	
36	Tom Lantos	D	CA-12	January 3, 1981	12th term	
37	Hal Rogers	R	KY-05	January 3, 1981	12th term	
38	Clay Shaw	R	FL-22	January 3, 1981	12th term	
39	Chris Smith	R	NJ-04	January 3, 1981	12th term	
40	Frank Wolf	R	VA-10	January 3, 1981	12th term	
41	Steny Hoyer	D	MD-05	May 19, 1981	12th term	
42	Mike Oxley	R	OH-04	June 25, 1981	12th term	
43	Howard Berman	D	CA-28	January 3, 1983	11th term	
44	Michael Bilirakis	R	FL-09	January 3, 1983	11th term	
45	Sherwood Boehlert	R	NY-24	January 3, 1983	11th term	
46	Rick Boucher	D	VA-09	January 3, 1983	11th term	
47	Dan Burton	R	IN-05	January 3, 1983	11th term	
48	Lane Evans	D	IL-17	January 3, 1983	11th term	
49	Nancy Johnson	R	CT-05	January 3, 1983	11th term	
50	Marcy Kaptur	D	OH-09	January 3, 1983	11th term	
51	Sander Levin	D	MI-12	January 3, 1983	11th term	
52	Bill Lipinski	D	IL-03	January 3, 1983	11th term	Left the House in 2005.
53	Alan Mollohan	D	WV-01	January 3, 1983	11th term	
54	Solomon P. Ortiz	D	TX-27	January 3, 1983	11th term	
55	Major Owens	D	NY-11	January 3, 1983	11th term	
56	John Spratt	D	SC-05	January 3, 1983	11th term	
57	Edolphus Towns	D	NY-10	January 3, 1983	11th term	
58	Gary Ackerman	D	NY-05	March 1, 1983	11th term	
59	Jerry Kleczka	D	WI-04	April 3, 1984	11th term	Left the House in 2005.
60	Jim Saxton	R	NJ-03	November 6, 1984	11th term	
61	Joe Barton	R	TX-06	January 3, 1985	10th term	
62	Howard Coble	R	NC-06	January 3, 1985	10th term	
63	Larry Combest	R	TX-19	January 3, 1985	10th term	Resigned on May 31, 2003.
64	Tom DeLay	R	TX-22	January 3, 1985	10th term	
65	Bart Gordon	D	TN-06	January 3, 1985	10th term	
66	Paul Kanjorski	D	PA-11	January 3, 1985	10th term	
67	Jim Kolbe	R	AZ-08	January 3, 1985	10th term	
68	Pete Visclosky	D	IN-01	January 3, 1985	10th term	
69	Cass Ballenger	R	NC-10	November 4, 1986	10th term	Left the House in 2005.
70	Richard Baker	R	LA-06	January 3, 1987	9th term	
71	Ben Cardin	D	MD-03	January 3, 1987	9th term	
72	Peter DeFazio	D	OR-04	January 3, 1987	9th term	
73	Elton Gallegly	R	CA-24	January 3, 1987	9th term	
74	Dennis Hastert	R	IL-14	January 3, 1987	9th term	Speaker of the House
75	Joel Hefley	R	CO-05	January 3, 1987	9th term	
76	Wally Herger	R	CA-02	January 3, 1987	9th term	
77	Amo Houghton	R	NY-29	January 3, 1987	9th term	Left the House in 2005.
78	John Lewis	D	GA-05	January 3, 1987	9th term	
79	Louise Slaughter	D	NY-28	January 3, 1987	9th term	
80	Lamar Smith	R	TX-21	January 3, 1987	9th term	
81	Fred Upton	R	MI-06	January 3, 1987	9th term	
82	Curt Weldon	R	PA-07	January 3, 1987	9th term	
83	Nancy Pelosi	D	CA-08	June 2, 1987	9th term	
84	Chris Shays	R	CT-04	August 18, 1987	9th term	
85	Jim McCrery	R	LA-04	April 16, 1988	9th term	
86	Jerry Costello	D	IL-12	August 9, 1988	9th term	
87	Jimmy Duncan	R	TN-02	November 8, 1988	9th term	
88	Frank Pallone	D	NJ-06	November 8, 1988	9th term	
89	Christopher Cox	R	CA-48	January 3, 1989	8th term	
90	Eliot Engel	D	NY-17	January 3, 1989	8th term	
91	Paul Gillmor	R	OH-05	January 3, 1989	8th term	
92	Porter Goss	R	FL-14	January 3, 1989	8th term	Resigned on September 23, 2004.
93	Nita Lowey	D	NY-18	January 3, 1989	8th term	
94	Jim McDermott	D	WA-07	January 3, 1989	8th term	
95	Michael R. McNulty	D	NY-21	January 3, 1989	8th term	
96	Richard Neal	D	MA-02	January 3, 1989	8th term	
97	Donald M. Payne	D	NJ-10	January 3, 1989	8th term	
98	Dana Rohrabacher	R	CA-46	January 3, 1989	8th term	
99	Cliff Stearns	R	FL-06	January 3, 1989	8th term	
100	John S. Tanner	D	TN-08	January 3, 1989	8th term	
101	James T. Walsh	R	NY-25	January 3, 1989	8th term	
102	Ileana Ros-Lehtinen	R	FL-18	August 29, 1989	8th term	
103	Gene Taylor	D	MS-04	October 17, 1989	8th term	
104	José E. Serrano	D	NY-16	March 20, 1990	8th term	
105	Rob Andrews	D	NJ-01	November 6, 1990	8th term	
106	Neil Abercrombie	D	HI-01	January 3, 1991; Previous service, 1986–1987.	8th term*	
107	John Boehner	R	OH-08	January 3, 1991	7th term	
108	Dave Camp	R	MI-04	January 3, 1991	7th term	
109	Bud Cramer	D	AL-05	January 3, 1991	7th term	
110	Duke Cunningham	R	CA-50	January 3, 1991	7th term	
111	Rosa DeLauro	D	CT-03	January 3, 1991	7th term	
112	John Doolittle	R	CA-04	January 3, 1991	7th term	
113	Cal Dooley	D	CA-20	January 3, 1991	7th term	Left the House in 2005.
114	Chet Edwards	D	TX-11	January 3, 1991	7th term	
115	Wayne Gilchrest	R	MD-01	January 3, 1991	7th term	
116	Dave Hobson	R	OH-07	January 3, 1991	7th term	
117	William J. Jefferson	D	LA-02	January 3, 1991	7th term	
118	Jim Moran	D	VA-08	January 3, 1991	7th term	
119	Jim Nussle	R	IA-01	January 3, 1991	7th term	
120	Collin Peterson	D	MN-07	January 3, 1991	7th term	
121	Jim Ramstad	R	MN-03	January 3, 1991	7th term	
122	Bernie Sanders	I	VT-AL	January 3, 1991	7th term	
123	Charles H. Taylor	R	NC-11	January 3, 1991	7th term	
124	Maxine Waters	D	CA-35	January 3, 1991	7th term	
125	Sam Johnson	R	TX-03	May 8, 1991	7th term	
126	John Olver	D	MA-01	June 18, 1991	7th term	
127	Ed Pastor	D	AZ-04	October 3, 1991	7th term	
128	Jerry Nadler	D	NY-08	November 3, 1992	7th term	
129	Spencer Bachus	R	AL-06	January 3, 1993	6th term	
130	Roscoe Bartlett	R	MD-06	January 3, 1993	6th term	
131	Xavier Becerra	D	CA-31	January 3, 1993	6th term	
132	Sanford Bishop	D	GA-02	January 3, 1993	6th term	
133	Henry Bonilla	R	TX-23	January 3, 1993	6th term	
134	Corrine Brown	D	FL-03	January 3, 1993	6th term	
135	Sherrod Brown	D	OH-13	January 3, 1993	6th term	
136	Steve Buyer	R	IN-04	January 3, 1993	6th term	
137	Ken Calvert	R	CA-44	January 3, 1993	6th term	
138	Mike Castle	R	DE-AL	January 3, 1993	6th term	
139	Jim Clyburn	D	SC-06	January 3, 1993	6th term	
140	Mac Collins	R	GA-08	January 3, 1993	6th term	Left the House in 2005.
141	Nathan Deal	R	GA-10	January 3, 1993	6th term	
142	Peter Deutsch	D	FL-20	January 3, 1993	6th term	Left the House in 2005.
143	Lincoln Díaz-Balart	R	FL-21	January 3, 1993	6th term	
144	Jennifer Dunn	R	WA-08	January 3, 1993	6th term	Left the House in 2005.
145	Anna Eshoo	D	CA-14	January 3, 1993	6th term	
146	Terry Everett	R	AL-02	January 3, 1993	6th term	
147	Bob Filner	D	CA-51	January 3, 1993	6th term	
148	Bob Goodlatte	R	VA-06	January 3, 1993	6th term	
149	Gene Green	D	TX-29	January 3, 1993	6th term	
150	James C. Greenwood	R	PA-08	January 3, 1993	6th term	Left the House in 2005.
151	Luis Gutiérrez	D	IL-04	January 3, 1993	6th term	
152	Alcee Hastings	D	FL-23	January 3, 1993	6th term	
153	Maurice Hinchey	D	NY-22	January 3, 1993	6th term	
154	Pete Hoekstra	R	MI-02	January 3, 1993	6th term	
155	Tim Holden	D	PA-17	January 3, 1993	6th term	
156	Ernest Istook	R	OK-05	January 3, 1993	6th term	
157	Eddie Bernice Johnson	D	TX-30	January 3, 1993	6th term	
158	Peter T. King	R	NY-03	January 3, 1993	6th term	
159	Jack Kingston	R	GA-01	January 3, 1993	6th term	
160	Joe Knollenberg	R	MI-09	January 3, 1993	6th term	
161	John Linder	R	GA-07	January 3, 1993	6th term	
162	Carolyn Maloney	D	NY-14	January 3, 1993	6th term	
163	Don Manzullo	R	IL-16	January 3, 1993	6th term	
164	John M. McHugh	R	NY-23	January 3, 1993	6th term	
165	Scott McInnis	R	CO-03	January 3, 1993	6th term	Left the House in 2005.
166	Buck McKeon	R	CA-25	January 3, 1993	6th term	
167	Marty Meehan	D	MA-05	January 3, 1993	6th term	
168	Bob Menendez	D	NJ-13	January 3, 1993	6th term	
169	John Mica	R	FL-07	January 3, 1993	6th term	
170	Richard Pombo	R	CA-11	January 3, 1993	6th term	
171	Earl Pomeroy	D	ND-AL	January 3, 1993	6th term	
172	Deborah Pryce	R	OH-15	January 3, 1993	6th term	
173	Jack Quinn	R	NY-27	January 3, 1993	6th term	Left the House in 2005.
174	Lucille Roybal-Allard	D	CA-34	January 3, 1993	6th term	
175	Ed Royce	R	CA-40	January 3, 1993	6th term	
176	Bobby Rush	D	IL-01	January 3, 1993	6th term	
177	Bobby Scott	D	VA-03	January 3, 1993	6th term	
178	Nick Smith	R	MI-07	January 3, 1993	6th term	Left the House in 2005.
179	Bart Stupak	D	MI-01	January 3, 1993	6th term	
180	Nydia Velázquez	D	NY-12	January 3, 1993	6th term	
181	Mel Watt	D	NC-12	January 3, 1993	6th term	
182	Lynn Woolsey	D	CA-06	January 3, 1993	6th term	
183	Albert Wynn	D	MD-04	January 3, 1993	6th term	
184	Bennie Thompson	D	MS-02	April 13, 1993	6th term	
185	Rob Portman	R	OH-02	May 4, 1993	6th term	
186	Sam Farr	D	CA-17	June 8, 1993	6th term	
187	Vern Ehlers	R	MI-03	December 7, 1993	6th term	
188	Frank Lucas	R	OK-03	May 10, 1994	6th term	
189	Ron Lewis	R	KY-02	May 24, 1994	6th term	
190	Charles Bass	R	NH-02	January 3, 1995	5th term	
191	Richard Burr	R	NC-05	January 3, 1995	5th term	Left the House in 2005.
192	Steve Chabot	R	OH-01	January 3, 1995	5th term	
193	Barbara Cubin	R	WY-AL	January 3, 1995	5th term	
194	Tom Davis	R	VA-11	January 3, 1995	5th term	
195	Lloyd Doggett	D	TX-10	January 3, 1995	5th term	
196	Mike Doyle	D	PA-14	January 3, 1995	5th term	
197	Phil English	R	PA-03	January 3, 1995	5th term	
198	Chaka Fattah	D	PA-02	January 3, 1995	5th term	
199	Mark Foley	R	FL-16	January 3, 1995	5th term	
200	Rodney Frelinghuysen	R	NJ-11	January 3, 1995	5th term	
201	Gil Gutknecht	R	MN-01	January 3, 1995	5th term	
202	Doc Hastings	R	WA-04	January 3, 1995	5th term	
203	J. D. Hayworth	R	AZ-05	January 3, 1995	5th term	
204	John Hostettler	R	IN-08	January 3, 1995	5th term	
205	Sheila Jackson Lee	D	TX-18	January 3, 1995	5th term	
206	Walter B. Jones Jr.	R	NC-03	January 3, 1995	5th term	
207	Sue W. Kelly	R	NY-19	January 3, 1995	5th term	
208	Patrick J. Kennedy	D	RI-01	January 3, 1995	5th term	
209	Ray LaHood	R	IL-18	January 3, 1995	5th term	
210	Tom Latham	R	IA-04	January 3, 1995	5th term	
211	Steve LaTourette	R	OH-14	January 3, 1995	5th term	
212	Frank LoBiondo	R	NJ-02	January 3, 1995	5th term	
213	Zoe Lofgren	D	CA-16	January 3, 1995	5th term	
214	Karen McCarthy	D	MO-05	January 3, 1995	5th term	Left the House in 2005.
215	Sue Myrick	R	NC-09	January 3, 1995	5th term	
216	George Nethercutt	R	WA-05	January 3, 1995	5th term	Left the House in 2005.
217	Bob Ney	R	OH-18	January 3, 1995	5th term	
218	Charlie Norwood	R	GA-09	January 3, 1995	5th term	
219	George Radanovich	R	CA-19	January 3, 1995	5th term	
220	John Shadegg	R	AZ-03	January 3, 1995	5th term	
221	Mark Souder	R	IN-03	January 3, 1995	5th term	
222	Mac Thornberry	R	TX-13	January 3, 1995	5th term	
223	Todd Tiahrt	R	KS-04	January 3, 1995	5th term	
224	Zach Wamp	R	TN-03	January 3, 1995	5th term	
225	Dave Weldon	R	FL-15	January 3, 1995	5th term	
226	Jerry Weller	R	IL-11	January 3, 1995	5th term	
227	Ed Whitfield	R	KY-01	January 3, 1995	5th term	
228	Roger Wicker	R	MS-01	January 3, 1995	5th term	
229	Jesse Jackson Jr.	D	IL-02	December 12, 1995	5th term	
230	Juanita Millender-McDonald	D	CA-37	March 26, 1996	5th term	
231	Elijah Cummings	D	MD-07	April 16, 1996	5th term	
232	Earl Blumenauer	D	OR-03	May 21, 1996	5th term	
233	Jo Ann Emerson	R	MO-08	November 5, 1996	5th term	
234	Jim Ryun	R	KS-02	November 27, 1996	5th term	
235	Robert Aderholt	R	AL-04	January 3, 1997	4th term	
236	Tom Allen	D	ME-01	January 3, 1997	4th term	
237	Marion Berry	D	AR-01	January 3, 1997	4th term	
238	Roy Blunt	R	MO-07	January 3, 1997	4th term	
239	Leonard Boswell	D	IA-03	January 3, 1997	4th term	
240	Allen Boyd	D	FL-02	January 3, 1997	4th term	
241	Kevin Brady	R	TX-08	January 3, 1997	4th term	
242	Chris Cannon	R	UT-03	January 3, 1997	4th term	
243	Julia Carson	D	IN-07	January 3, 1997	4th term	
244	Danny K. Davis	D	IL-07	January 3, 1997	4th term	
245	Jim Davis	D	FL-11	January 3, 1997	4th term	
246	Diana DeGette	D	CO-01	January 3, 1997	4th term	
247	Bill Delahunt	D	MA-10	January 3, 1997	4th term	
248	Bob Etheridge	D	NC-02	January 3, 1997	4th term	
249	Harold Ford Jr.	D	TN-09	January 3, 1997	4th term	
250	Jim Gibbons	R	NV-02	January 3, 1997	4th term	
251	Virgil Goode	R	VA-05	January 3, 1997	4th term	
252	Kay Granger	R	TX-12	January 3, 1997	4th term	
253	Rubén Hinojosa	D	TX-15	January 3, 1997	4th term	
254	Darlene Hooley	D	OR-05	January 3, 1997	4th term	
255	Kenny Hulshof	R	MO-09	January 3, 1997	4th term	
256	Bill Jenkins	R	TN-01	January 3, 1997	4th term	
257	Chris John	D	LA-07	January 3, 1997	4th term	Left the House in 2005.
258	Carolyn Cheeks Kilpatrick	D	MI-13	January 3, 1997	4th term	
259	Ron Kind	D	WI-03	January 3, 1997	4th term	
260	Dennis Kucinich	D	OH-10	January 3, 1997	4th term	
261	Nick Lampson	D	TX-09	January 3, 1997	4th term	Left the House in 2005.
262	Carolyn McCarthy	D	NY-04	January 3, 1997	4th term	
263	Jim McGovern	D	MA-03	January 3, 1997	4th term	
264	Mike McIntyre	D	NC-07	January 3, 1997	4th term	
265	Jerry Moran	R	KS-01	January 3, 1997	4th term	
266	Anne Northup	R	KY-03	January 3, 1997	4th term	
267	Bill Pascrell	D	NJ-08	January 3, 1997	4th term	
268	Ron Paul	R	TX-14	January 3, 1997; Previous service, 1976–1977 and 1979–1985.	8th term**	
269	John E. Peterson	R	PA-05	January 3, 1997	4th term	
270	Chip Pickering	R	MS-03	January 3, 1997	4th term	
271	Joe Pitts	R	PA-16	January 3, 1997	4th term	
272	David Price	D	NC-04	January 3, 1997; Previous service, 1987–1995.	8th term*	
273	Silvestre Reyes	D	TX-16	January 3, 1997	4th term	
274	Steve Rothman	D	NJ-09	January 3, 1997	4th term	
275	Loretta Sanchez	D	CA-47	January 3, 1997	4th term	
276	Max Sandlin	D	TX-01	January 3, 1997	4th term	Left the House in 2005.
277	Pete Sessions	R	TX-32	January 3, 1997	4th term	
278	Brad Sherman	D	CA-27	January 3, 1997	4th term	
279	John Shimkus	R	IL-19	January 3, 1997	4th term	
280	Adam Smith	D	WA-09	January 3, 1997	4th term	
281	Vic Snyder	D	AR-02	January 3, 1997	4th term	
282	Ted Strickland	D	OH-06	January 3, 1997; Previous service, 1993–1995.	5th term*	
283	Ellen Tauscher	D	CA-10	January 3, 1997	4th term	
284	John F. Tierney	D	MA-06	January 3, 1997	4th term	
285	Jim Turner	D	TX-02	January 3, 1997	4th term	Left the House in 2005.
286	Robert Wexler	D	FL-19	January 3, 1997	4th term	
287	Ciro Rodriguez	D	TX-28	April 12, 1997	4th term	Left the House in 2005.
288	Vito Fossella	R	NY-13	November 4, 1997	4th term	
289	Gregory Meeks	D	NY-06	February 3, 1998	4th term	
290	Lois Capps	D	CA-23	March 10, 1998	4th term	
291	Mary Bono	R	CA-45	April 7, 1998	4th term	
292	Barbara Lee	D	CA-09	April 7, 1998	4th term	
293	Bob Brady	D	PA-01	May 19, 1998	4th term	
294	Heather Wilson	R	NM-01	June 25, 1998	4th term	
295	Brian Baird	D	WA-03	January 3, 1999	3rd term	
296	Tammy Baldwin	D	WI-02	January 3, 1999	3rd term	
297	Shelley Berkley	D	NV-01	January 3, 1999	3rd term	
298	Judy Biggert	R	IL-13	January 3, 1999	3rd term	
299	Mike Capuano	D	MA-08	January 3, 1999	3rd term	
300	Joe Crowley	D	NY-07	January 3, 1999	3rd term	
301	Jim DeMint	R	SC-04	January 3, 1999	3rd term	Left the House in 2005.
302	Ernie Fletcher	R	KY-06	January 3, 1999	3rd term	Resigned on December 8, 2003, to become Governor of Kentucky.
303	Charlie Gonzalez	D	TX-20	January 3, 1999	3rd term	
304	Mark Green	R	WI-08	January 3, 1999	3rd term	
305	Robin Hayes	R	NC-08	January 3, 1999	3rd term	
306	Baron Hill	D	IN-09	January 3, 1999	3rd term	Left the House in 2005.
307	Joe Hoeffel	D	PA-13	January 3, 1999	3rd term	Left the House in 2005.
308	Rush Holt Jr.	D	NJ-12	January 3, 1999	3rd term	
309	Jay Inslee	D	WA-01	January 3, 1999; Previous service, 1993–1995.	4th term*	
310	Stephanie Tubbs Jones	D	OH-11	January 3, 1999	3rd term	
311	John B. Larson	D	CT-01	January 3, 1999	3rd term	
312	Ken Lucas	D	KY-04	January 3, 1999	3rd term	Left the House in 2005.
313	Gary Miller	R	CA-42	January 3, 1999	3rd term	
314	Dennis Moore	D	KS-03	January 3, 1999	3rd term	
315	Grace Napolitano	D	CA-38	January 3, 1999	3rd term	
316	Doug Ose	R	CA-03	January 3, 1999	3rd term	Left the House in 2005.
317	Thomas M. Reynolds	R	NY-26	January 3, 1999	3rd term	
318	Paul Ryan	R	WI-01	January 3, 1999	3rd term	
319	Jan Schakowsky	D	IL-09	January 3, 1999	3rd term	
320	Don Sherwood	R	PA-10	January 3, 1999	3rd term	
321	Mike Simpson	R	ID-02	January 3, 1999	3rd term	
322	John E. Sweeney	R	NY-20	January 3, 1999	3rd term	
323	Tom Tancredo	R	CO-06	January 3, 1999	3rd term	
324	Lee Terry	R	NE-02	January 3, 1999	3rd term	
325	Mike Thompson	D	CA-01	January 3, 1999	3rd term	
326	Pat Toomey	R	PA-15	January 3, 1999	3rd term	Left the House in 2005.
327	Mark Udall	D	CO-02	January 3, 1999	3rd term	
328	Tom Udall	D	NM-03	January 3, 1999	3rd term	
329	Greg Walden	R	OR-02	January 3, 1999	3rd term	
330	Anthony Weiner	D	NY-09	January 3, 1999	3rd term	
331	David Wu	D	OR-01	January 3, 1999	3rd term	
332	Johnny Isakson	R	GA-06	February 23, 1999	3rd term	Left the House in 2005.
333	David Vitter	R	LA-01	May 29, 1999	3rd term	Left the House in 2005.
334	Joe Baca	D	CA-43	November 16, 1999	3rd term	
335	Todd Akin	R	MO-02	January 3, 2001	2nd term	
336	Henry E. Brown Jr.	R	SC-01	January 3, 2001	2nd term	
337	Eric Cantor	R	VA-07	January 3, 2001	2nd term	
338	Shelley Moore Capito	R	WV-02	January 3, 2001	2nd term	
339	Brad Carson	D	OK-02	January 3, 2001	2nd term	Left the House in 2005.
340	Lacy Clay	D	MO-01	January 3, 2001	2nd term	
341	Ander Crenshaw	R	FL-04	January 3, 2001	2nd term	
342	John Culberson	R	TX-07	January 3, 2001	2nd term	
343	Jo Ann Davis	R	VA-01	January 3, 2001	2nd term	
344	Susan Davis	D	CA-53	January 3, 2001	2nd term	
345	Mike Ferguson	R	NJ-07	January 3, 2001	2nd term	
346	Jeff Flake	R	AZ-06	January 3, 2001	2nd term	
347	Sam Graves	R	MO-06	January 3, 2001	2nd term	
348	Jane Harman	D	CA-36	January 3, 2001; Previous service, 1993–1999.	5th term*	
349	Melissa Hart	R	PA-04	January 3, 2001	2nd term	
350	Mike Honda	D	CA-15	January 3, 2001	2nd term	
351	Steve Israel	D	NY-02	January 3, 2001	2nd term	
352	Darrell Issa	R	CA-49	January 3, 2001	2nd term	
353	Tim Johnson	R	IL-15	January 3, 2001	2nd term	
354	Ric Keller	R	FL-08	January 3, 2001	2nd term	
355	Mark Kennedy	R	MN-06	January 3, 2001	2nd term	
356	Mark Kirk	R	IL-10	January 3, 2001	2nd term	
357	James Langevin	D	RI-02	January 3, 2001	2nd term	
358	Rick Larsen	D	WA-02	January 3, 2001	2nd term	
359	Jim Matheson	D	UT-02	January 3, 2001	2nd term	
360	Betty McCollum	D	MN-04	January 3, 2001	2nd term	
361	Tom Osborne	R	NE-03	January 3, 2001	2nd term	
362	Mike Pence	R	IN-06	January 3, 2001	2nd term	
363	Todd Platts	R	PA-19	January 3, 2001	2nd term	
364	Butch Otter	R	ID-01	January 3, 2001	2nd term	
365	Adam Putnam	R	FL-12	January 3, 2001	2nd term	
366	Denny Rehberg	R	MT-AL	January 3, 2001	2nd term	
367	Mike Rogers	R	MI-08	January 3, 2001	2nd term	
368	Mike Ross	D	AR-04	January 3, 2001	2nd term	
369	Adam Schiff	D	CA-29	January 3, 2001	2nd term	
370	Ed Schrock	R	VA-02	January 3, 2001	2nd term	Left the House in 2005.
371	Rob Simmons	R	CT-02	January 3, 2001	2nd term	
372	Hilda Solis	D	CA-32	January 3, 2001	2nd term	
373	Pat Tiberi	R	OH-12	January 3, 2001	2nd term	
374	Bill Shuster	R	PA-09	May 15, 2001	2nd term	
375	Diane Watson	D	CA-33	June 5, 2001	2nd term	
376	Randy Forbes	R	VA-04	June 19, 2001	2nd term	
377	Stephen Lynch	D	MA-09	October 16, 2001	2nd term	
378	Jeff Miller	R	FL-01	October 16, 2001	2nd term	
379	John Boozman	R	AR-03	November 20, 2001	2nd term	
380	Joe Wilson	R	SC-02	December 18, 2001	2nd term	
381	John Sullivan	R	OK-01	February 15, 2002	2nd term	
382	Ed Case	D	HI-02	November 30, 2002	2nd term	
383	Rodney Alexander	D	LA-05	January 3, 2003	1st term	Switched to Republican on August 9, 2004.
384	Frank Ballance	D	NC-01	January 3, 2003	1st term	Resigned on June 11, 2004.
385	Gresham Barrett	R	SC-03	January 3, 2003	1st term	
386	Bob Beauprez	R	CO-07	January 3, 2003	1st term	
387	Chris Bell	D	TX-25	January 3, 2003	1st term	Left the House in 2005.
388	Rob Bishop	R	UT-01	January 3, 2003	1st term	
389	Tim Bishop	D	NY-01	January 3, 2003	1st term	
390	Marsha Blackburn	R	TN-07	January 3, 2003	1st term	
391	Jo Bonner	R	AL-01	January 3, 2003	1st term	
392	Ginny Brown-Waite	R	FL-05	January 3, 2003	1st term	
393	Jeb Bradley	R	NH-01	January 3, 2003	1st term	
394	Max Burns	R	GA-12	January 3, 2003	1st term	Left the House in 2005.
395	Michael C. Burgess	R	TX-26	January 3, 2003	1st term	
396	Dennis Cardoza	D	CA-18	January 3, 2003	1st term	
397	John Carter	R	TX-31	January 3, 2003	1st term	
398	Chris Chocola	R	IN-02	January 3, 2003	1st term	
399	Tom Cole	R	OK-04	January 3, 2003	1st term	
400	Jim Cooper	D	TN-05	January 3, 2003; Previous service, 1983–1995.	7th term*	
401	Artur Davis	D	AL-07	January 3, 2003	1st term	
402	Lincoln Davis	D	TN-04	January 3, 2003	1st term	
403	Mario Díaz-Balart	R	FL-25	January 3, 2003	1st term	
404	Rahm Emanuel	D	IL-05	January 3, 2003	1st term	
405	Tom Feeney	R	FL-24	January 3, 2003	1st term	
406	Trent Franks	R	AZ-02	January 3, 2003	1st term	
407	Scott Garrett	R	NJ-05	January 3, 2003	1st term	
408	Jim Gerlach	R	PA-06	January 3, 2003	1st term	
409	Phil Gingrey	R	GA-11	January 3, 2003	1st term	
410	Raúl Grijalva	D	AZ-07	January 3, 2003	1st term	
411	Katherine Harris	R	FL-13	January 3, 2003	1st term	
412	Jeb Hensarling	R	TX-05	January 3, 2003	1st term	
413	Bill Janklow	R	SD-AL	January 3, 2003	1st term	Resigned on January 20, 2004.
414	Steve King	R	IA-05	January 3, 2003	1st term	
415	John Kline	R	MN-02	January 3, 2003	1st term	
416	Denise Majette	D	GA-04	January 3, 2003	1st term	Left the House in 2005.
417	Jim Marshall	D	GA-03	January 3, 2003	1st term	
418	Thaddeus McCotter	R	MI-11	January 3, 2003	1st term	
419	Kendrick Meek	D	FL-17	January 3, 2003	1st term	
420	Mike Michaud	D	ME-02	January 3, 2003	1st term	
421	Brad Miller	D	NC-13	January 3, 2003	1st term	
422	Candice Miller	R	MI-10	January 3, 2003	1st term	
423	Tim Murphy	R	PA-18	January 3, 2003	1st term	
424	Marilyn Musgrave	R	CO-04	January 3, 2003	1st term	
425	Devin Nunes	R	CA-21	January 3, 2003	1st term	
426	Steve Pearce	R	NM-02	January 3, 2003	1st term	
427	Jon Porter	R	NV-03	January 3, 2003	1st term	
428	Rick Renzi	R	AZ-01	January 3, 2003	1st term	
429	Mike Rogers	R	AL-03	January 3, 2003	1st term	
430	Dutch Ruppersberger	D	MD-02	January 3, 2003	1st term	
431	Tim Ryan	D	OH-17	January 3, 2003	1st term	
432	Linda Sánchez	D	CA-39	January 3, 2003	1st term	
433	David Scott	D	GA-13	January 3, 2003	1st term	
434	Mike Turner	R	OH-03	January 3, 2003	1st term	
435	Chris Van Hollen	D	MD-08	January 3, 2003	1st term	
	Randy Neugebauer	R	TX-19	June 3, 2003	1st term	
	Ben Chandler	D	KY-06	February 17, 2004	1st term	
	Stephanie Herseth	D	SD-AL	June 1, 2004	1st term	
	G. K. Butterfield	D	NC-01	July 20, 2004	1st term	

== Delegates ==
Rank	Delegate	Party	District	Seniority date (Previous service, if any)	No.# of term(s)	Notes
1	Eni Faleomavaega	D	AS	January 3, 1989	8th term	
2	Eleanor Holmes Norton	D	DC	January 3, 1991	7th term	
3	Donna Christian-Christensen	D	VI	January 3, 1997	4th term	
4	Aníbal Acevedo Vilá	D	PR	January 3, 2001	2nd term	
5	Madeleine Bordallo	D	GU	January 3, 2003	1st term	

== See also ==
- 108th United States Congress
- List of United States congressional districts
- List of United States senators in the 108th Congress
