= List of United States senators in the 107th Congress =

This is a complete list of United States senators during the 107th United States Congress listed by seniority from January 3, 2001, to January 3, 2003.

Order of service is based on the commencement of the senator's first term. Behind this is former service as a U.S. senator (only giving the senator seniority within their new incoming class), service as vice president, a House member, a cabinet secretary, a state governor, and then by their state's population, respectively.

In this congress, Ernest Hollings (D-South Carolina) was the most senior junior senator and Chuck Schumer (D-New York) was the most junior senior senator until Paul Wellstone's death from a plane crash on October 25, 2002, Mark Dayton (D-Minnesota) took this distinction until the end of the congress.

Senators who were sworn in during the middle of the two-year congressional term (up until the last senator who was not sworn in early after winning the November 2002 election) are listed at the end of the list with no number.

== Terms of service ==
Class	Terms of service of senators that expired in years
Class 2	Terms of service of senators that expired in 2003 (AK, AL, AR, CO, DE, GA, IA, ID, IL, KS, KY, LA, MA, ME, MI, MN, MS, MT, NC, NE, NH, NJ, NM, OK, OR, RI, SC, SD, TN, TX, VA, WV, and WY.)
Class 3	Terms of service of senators that expired in 2005 (AK, AL, AR, AZ, CA, CO, CT, FL, GA, HI, IA, ID, IL, IN, KS, KY, LA, MD, MO, NC, ND, NH, NV, NY, OH, OK, OR, PA, SC, SD, UT, VT, WA, and WI.)
Class 1	Terms of service of senators that expired in 2007 (AZ, CA, CT, DE, FL, HI, IN, MA, MD, ME, MI, MN, MO, MS, MT, ND, NE, NJ, NM, NV, NY, OH, PA, RI, TN, TX, UT, VA, VT, WA, WV, WI, and WY.)

== U.S. Senate seniority list ==
U.S. Senate seniority
Rank	Senator (party-state)	Seniority date	Other factors
1	Strom Thurmond (R-SC)	November 7, 1956	
2	Robert Byrd (D-WV)	January 3, 1959	
3	Ted Kennedy (D-MA)	November 7, 1962	
4	Daniel Inouye (D-HI)	January 3, 1963	
5	Ernest Hollings (D-SC)	November 9, 1966	
6	Ted Stevens (R-AK)	December 24, 1968	
7	Jesse Helms (R-NC)	January 3, 1973	North Carolina 12th in population (1970)
8	Pete Domenici (R-NM)	January 3, 1973	New Mexico 37th in population (1970)
9	Joe Biden (D-DE)	January 3, 1973	Delaware 46th in population (1970)
10	Patrick Leahy (D-VT)	January 3, 1975	
11	Paul Sarbanes (D-MD)	January 3, 1977	Former member of the U.S. House of Representatives
12	Richard Lugar (R-IN)	January 3, 1977	Indiana 11th in population (1970)
13	Orrin Hatch (R-UT)	January 3, 1977	Utah 36th in population (1970)
14	Max Baucus (D-MT)	December 15, 1978	
15	Thad Cochran (R-MS)	December 27, 1978	
16	John Warner (R-VA)	January 2, 1979	
17	Carl Levin (D-MI)	January 3, 1979	
18	Chris Dodd (D-CT)	January 3, 1981	Former member of the U.S. House of Representatives (6 years); Connecticut 24th in population (1970)
19	Chuck Grassley (R-IA)	January 3, 1981	Former member of the U.S. House of Representatives (6 years); Iowa 25th in population (1970)
20	Arlen Specter (R-PA)	January 3, 1981	Pennsylvania 3rd in population (1970)
21	Don Nickles (R-OK)	January 3, 1981	Oklahoma 27th in population (1970)
22	Frank Murkowski (Note: In Alaska, Frank Murkowski (R) stepped down on December 2, 2002, after being elected Governor of Alaska. He was replaced by his daughter, Lisa Murkowski (R).) (R-AK)	January 3, 1981	Alaska 50th in population (1970)
23	Jeff Bingaman (D-NM)	January 3, 1983	
24	John Kerry (D-MA)	January 2, 1985	
25	Tom Harkin (D-IA)	January 3, 1985	Former member of the U.S. House of Representatives (10 years)
26	Phil Gramm (R-TX)	January 3, 1985	Former member of the U.S. House of Representatives (6 years)
27	Mitch McConnell (R-KY)	January 3, 1985	
28	Jay Rockefeller (D-WV)	January 15, 1985	
29	John Breaux (D-LA)	January 3, 1987	Former member of the U.S. House of Representatives (14 years)
30	Barbara Mikulski (D-MD)	January 3, 1987	Former member of the U.S. House of Representatives (10 years)
31	Richard Shelby (R-AL)	January 3, 1987	Former member of the U.S. House of Representatives (8 years); Alabama 22nd in population (1980)
32	Tom Daschle (D-SD)	January 3, 1987	Former member of the U.S. House of Representatives (8 years); South Dakota 45th in population (1980)
33	John McCain (R-AZ)	January 3, 1987	Former member of the U.S. House of Representatives (4 years); Arizona 29th in population (1980)
34	Harry Reid (D-NV)	January 3, 1987	Former member of the U.S. House of Representatives (4 years); Nevada 43rd in population (1980)
35	Bob Graham (D-FL)	January 3, 1987	Former governor; Florida 7th in population (1980)
36	Kit Bond (R-MO)	January 3, 1987	Former governor; Missouri 15th in population (1980)
37	Kent Conrad (D-ND)	January 3, 1987	
38	Trent Lott (R-MS)	January 3, 1989	Former member of the U.S. House of Representatives (16 years)
39	Jim Jeffords (R, I-VT (Note: Despite Jim Jeffords's 2001 party change, he retained his seniority.))	January 3, 1989	Former member of the U.S. House of Representatives (14 years)
40	Herb Kohl (D-WI)	January 3, 1989	Wisconsin 16th in population (1980)
41	Joe Lieberman (D-CT)	January 3, 1989	Connecticut 25th in population (1980)
42	Conrad Burns (R-MT)	January 3, 1989	Montana 44th in population (1980)
43	Daniel Akaka (D-HI)	May 16, 1990	
44	Bob Smith (R-NH)	December 7, 1990	
45	Larry Craig (R-ID)	January 3, 1991	Former member of the U.S. House of Representatives
46	Paul Wellstone (Note: In Minnesota, Paul Wellstone (D) died in a plane crash on October 25, 2002, before he could get re-elected. He was replaced by Dean Barkley (I), who was appointed by Governor Jesse Ventura but only had to serve until the end of this Congress.) (D-MN)	January 3, 1991	
47	Dianne Feinstein (D-CA)	November 10, 1992	
48	Byron Dorgan (D-ND)	December 15, 1992	
49	Barbara Boxer (D-CA)	January 3, 1993	Former member of the U.S. House of Representatives (10 years)
50	Judd Gregg (R-NH)	January 3, 1993	Former member of the U.S. House of Representatives (8 years)
51	Ben Nighthorse Campbell (R-CO)	January 3, 1993	Former member of the U.S. House of Representatives (6 years)
52	Russ Feingold (D-WI)	January 3, 1993	Wisconsin 16th in population (1990)
53	Patty Murray (D-WA)	January 3, 1993	Washington 18th in population (1990)
54	Bob Bennett (R-UT)	January 3, 1993	Utah 35th in population (1990)
55	Kay Bailey Hutchison (R-TX)	June 14, 1993	
56	Jim Inhofe (R-OK)	November 17, 1994	
57	Fred Thompson (R-TN)	December 2, 1994	
58	Olympia Snowe (R-ME)	January 3, 1995	Former member of the U.S. House of Representatives (16 years)
59	Mike DeWine (R-OH)	January 3, 1995	Former member of the U.S. House of Representatives (8 years); Ohio 7th in population (1990)
60	Jon Kyl (R-AZ)	January 3, 1995	Former member of the U.S. House of Representatives (8 years); Arizona 24th in population (1990)
61	Craig L. Thomas (R-WY)	January 3, 1995	Former member of the U.S. House of Representatives (6 years)
62	Rick Santorum (R-PA)	January 3, 1995	Former member of the U.S. House of Representatives (4 years)
63	Bill Frist (R-TN)	January 3, 1995	
64	Ron Wyden (D-OR)	February 6, 1996	
65	Sam Brownback (R-KS)	November 7, 1996	
66	Pat Roberts (R-KS)	January 3, 1997	Former member of the U.S. House of Representatives (16 years)
67	Dick Durbin (D-IL)	January 3, 1997	Former member of the U.S. House of Representatives (14 years); Illinois 6th in population (1990)
68	Robert Torricelli (D-NJ)	January 3, 1997	Former member of the U.S. House of Representatives (14 years); New Jersey 9th in population (1990)
69	Tim Johnson (D-SD)	January 3, 1997	Former member of the U.S. House of Representatives (10 years)
70	Wayne Allard (R-CO)	January 3, 1997	Former member of the U.S. House of Representatives (6 years); Colorado 26th in population (1990)
71	Jack Reed (D-RI)	January 3, 1997	Former member of the U.S. House of Representatives (6 years); Rhode Island 43rd in population (1990)
72	Tim Hutchinson (R-AR)	January 3, 1997	Former member of the U.S. House of Representatives (4 years)
73	Max Cleland (D-GA)	January 3, 1997	Georgia 11th in population (1990)
74	Mary Landrieu (D-LA)	January 3, 1997	Louisiana 21st in population (1990)
75	Jeff Sessions (R-AL)	January 3, 1997	Alabama 22nd in population (1990)
76	Gordon H. Smith (R-OR)	January 3, 1997	Oregon 29th in population (1990)
77	Chuck Hagel (R-NE)	January 3, 1997	Nebraska 36th in population (1990)
78	Susan Collins (R-ME)	January 3, 1997	Maine 38th in population (1990)
79	Mike Enzi (R-WY)	January 3, 1997	Wyoming 50th in population (1990)
80	Chuck Schumer (D-NY)	January 3, 1999	Former member of the U.S. House of Representatives (18 years)
81	Jim Bunning (R-KY)	January 3, 1999	Former member of the U.S. House of Representatives (12 years)
82	Mike Crapo (R-ID)	January 3, 1999	Former member of the U.S. House of Representatives (6 years)
83	Blanche Lincoln (D-AR)	January 3, 1999	Former member of the U.S. House of Representatives (4 years)
84	George Voinovich (R-OH)	January 3, 1999	Former governor; Ohio 7th in population (1990)
85	Evan Bayh (D-IN)	January 3, 1999	Former governor; Indiana 14th in population (1990)
86	Peter Fitzgerald (R-IL)	January 3, 1999	Illinois 6th in population (1990)
87	John Edwards (D-NC)	January 3, 1999	North Carolina 10th in population (1990)
88	Lincoln Chafee (R-RI)	November 4, 1999	
89	Zell Miller (D-GA)	July 27, 2000	
90	Bill Nelson (D-FL)	January 3, 2001	Former member of the U.S. House of Representatives (12 years)
91	Tom Carper (D-DE)	January 3, 2001	Former member of the U.S. House of Representatives (10 years)
92	Debbie Stabenow (D-MI)	January 3, 2001	Former member of the U.S. House of Representatives (4 years); Michigan 8th in population (1990)
93	John Ensign (R-NV)	January 3, 2001	Former member of the U.S. House of Representatives (4 years); Nevada 39th in population (1990)
94	George Allen (R-VA)	January 3, 2001	Former member of the U.S. House of Representatives (2 years); Former governor
95	Maria Cantwell (D-WA)	January 3, 2001	Former member of the U.S. House of Representatives (2 years)
96	Ben Nelson (D-NE)	January 3, 2001	Former governor
97	Hillary Clinton (Note: Hillary Clinton's status as a former first lady (effective January 20, 2001), while having some bearing on ceremonial precedence, has no effect on her seniority within the United states Senate.) (D-NY)	January 3, 2001	New York 2nd in population (1990)
98	Jon Corzine (D-NJ)	January 3, 2001	New Jersey 9th in population (1990)
99	Jean Carnahan (Note: In Missouri, Senator-elect Mel Carnahan (D) died October 16, 2000 as a result on a plane crash and was elected posthumously. His widow, Jean Carnahan (D) was appointed by Governor Roger B. Wilson at the start of the Congress along with the other incoming freshmen senators, and served until a successor was elected. In the 2002 special election, Carnahan lost to Jim Talent (R) to finish her husband's unexpired term.) (D-MO)	January 3, 2001	Missouri 15th in population (1990)
100	Mark Dayton (D-MN)	January 3, 2001	Minnesota 20th in population (1990)
	Dean Barkley (I-MN)	November 5, 2002	
	Jim Talent (R-MO)	November 25, 2002	
	John Cornyn (R-TX)	December 2, 2002	
	Lisa Murkowski (R-AK)	December 20, 2002	

The most senior senators by class were Robert Byrd (D-West Virginia) from Class 1, Strom Thurmond (R-South Carolina) from Class 2, and Daniel Inouye (D-Hawaii) from Class 3.

== See also ==
- 107th United States Congress
- List of United States representatives in the 107th Congress
