= List of new members of the 106th United States Congress =

The 106th United States Congress began on January 3, 1999. There were eight new senators (four Democrats, four Republicans) and 40 new representatives (23 Democrats, 17 Republicans) at the start of the first session. Additionally, two senators (one Democrat, one Republican) and three representatives (one Democrat, two Republicans) took office on various dates in order to fill vacancies during the 106th Congress before it ended on January 3, 2001.

== Senate ==
=== Took office January 3, 1999 ===
State	Image	Senator	Seniority	Switched party	Prior background	Birth year
Arkansas		Blanche Lincoln (D)	4th (96th overall)	No; Open seat; replaced Dale Bumpers (D)	U.S. House of Representatives (Note: Elected to the 103rd Congress, served from 1993 to 1997 at Arkansas's 1st district.)	1960
Idaho		Mike Crapo (R)	3rd (95th overall)	No; Open seat; replaced Dirk Kempthorne (R)	U.S. House of Representatives (Note: Elected to the 103rd Congress, served from 1993 to 1999 at Idaho's 2nd district.); Idaho Senate	1951
Illinois		Peter Fitzgerald (R)	7th (99th overall)	Yes; Defeated Carol Moseley Braun (D)	Illinois Senate	1960
Indiana		Evan Bayh (D)	6th (98th overall)	Yes; Open seat; replaced Dan Coats (R)	Governor of Indiana; Secretary of State of Indiana	1955
Kentucky		Jim Bunning (R)	2nd (94th overall)	Yes; Open seat; replaced Wendell Ford (D)	U.S. House of Representatives (Note: Elected to the 100th Congress, served from 1987 to 1999 at Kentucky's 4th district.); Kentucky Senate; Baseball player	1931
New York		Chuck Schumer (D)	1st (93rd overall)	Yes; Defeated Al D'Amato (R)	U.S. House of Representatives (Note: Elected to the 97th Congress, served from 1981 to 1983 at New York's 16th district, then from 1983 to 1993 at New York's 10th district and from 1993 to 1999 at New York's 9th district.); New York State Assembly	1950
North Carolina		John Edwards (D)	8th (100th overall)	Yes; Defeated Lauch Faircloth (R)	Lawyer	1953
Ohio		George Voinovich (R)	5th (97th overall)	Yes; Open seat; replaced John Glenn (D)	Governor of Ohio; Mayor of Cleveland; Ohio House of Representatives	1936

=== Took office during the 106th Congress ===
State	Image	Senator	Took office	Switched party	Prior background	Birth year
Rhode Island		Lincoln Chafee (R)	November 2, 1999	No; Appointed; replaced John Chafee (R)	Mayor of Warwick	1953
Georgia		Zell Miller (D)	July 24, 2000	Yes; Appointed; replaced Paul Coverdell (R)	Governor of Georgia; Lieutenant Governor of Georgia; Georgia State Senate	1932

== House of Representatives ==
=== Took office January 3, 1999 ===
District	Representative	Switched party	Prior background	Birth year
California 1	Mike Thompson (D)	Yes	State Senator	1951
California 3	Doug Ose (R)	Yes	Real estate developer	1955
California 34	Grace Napolitano (D)	No	State Assemblywoman	1936
California 36	Steven T. Kuykendall (R)	Yes	State Assemblyman	1947
California 41	Gary Miller (R)	No	State Assemblyman	1948
Colorado 2	Mark Udall (D)	No	State Representative	1950
Colorado 6	Tom Tancredo (R)	No	State Representative	1945
Connecticut 1	John B. Larson (D)	No	State Senator	1948
Idaho 2	Mike Simpson (R)	No	State Representative	1950
Illinois 9	Jan Schakowsky (D)	No	State Representative	1944
Illinois 13	Judy Biggert (R)	No	State Representative	1937
Illinois 19	David D. Phelps (D)	No	State Representative	1947
Indiana 9	Baron Hill (D)	No	State Representative	1953
Kansas 3	Dennis Moore (D)	Yes	District attorney	1945
Kentucky 4	Ken Lucas (D)	Yes	Judge	1933
Kentucky 6	Ernie Fletcher (R)	Yes	State Representative	1952
Massachusetts 8	Mike Capuano (D)	No	Mayor of Somerville	1952
Mississippi 4	Ronnie Shows (D)	Yes	State Senator	1947
Nebraska 2	Lee Terry (R)	No	City Councillor	1962
Nevada 1	Shelley Berkley (D)	Yes	State Assemblywoman	1951
New Jersey 12	Rush Holt Jr. (D)	Yes	Scientist	1948
New Mexico 3	Tom Udall (D)	Yes	Attorney General of New Mexico	1948
New York 7	Joe Crowley (D)	No	State Assemblyman	1962
New York 9	Anthony Weiner (D)	No	City Councilor	1964
New York 22	John E. Sweeney (R)	No	New York Labor Commissioner	1955
New York 27	Thomas M. Reynolds (R)	No	State Assemblyman	1950
North Carolina 8	Robin Hayes (R)	Yes	State Representative	1945
Ohio 11	Stephanie Tubbs Jones (D)	No	Prosecutor	1949
Oregon 1	David Wu (D)	No	Law clerk	1955
Oregon 2	Greg Walden (R)	No	State Senator	1957
Pennsylvania 10	Don Sherwood (R)	No	Automobile dealer	1941
Pennsylvania 13	Joe Hoeffel (D)	Yes	State Representative	1950
Pennsylvania 15	Pat Toomey (R)	Yes	Businessman	1961
South Carolina 4	Jim DeMint (R)	No	Market researcher	1951
Texas 20	Charlie Gonzalez (D)	No	Judge	1945
Washington 1	Jay Inslee (D)	Yes	U.S. Representative (Note: Previously elected to the 103rd Congress, served from 1993 to 1995 at Washington's 4th district.); State Representative	1951
Washington 3	Brian Baird (D)	Yes	Psychologist	1956
Wisconsin 1	Paul Ryan (R)	No	Legislative aide	1970
Wisconsin 2	Tammy Baldwin (D)	Yes	State Assemblywoman	1962
Wisconsin 8	Mark Andrew Green (R)	Yes	State Assemblyman	1960

=== Took office during the 106th Congress ===
District	Representative	Took office	Switched party	Prior background	Birth year
Georgia 6	Johnny Isakson (R)	February 23, 1999	No	State Senator	1944
Louisiana 1	David Vitter (R)	May 29, 1999	No	State Representative	1961
California 42	Joe Baca (D)	November 16, 1999	No	State Senator	1947

== See also ==
- List of United States representatives in the 106th Congress
- List of United States senators in the 106th Congress

== Notes ==
Preceded by New members of the 105th Congress	New members of the 106th Congress; 1999–2001	Succeeded by New members of the 107th Congress
