= Leslie Trapp =

American politician

Member of the Kentucky House of Representatives from the 78th district
- In office January 1, 1993 – January 1, 1995
- Preceded by: Pat Freibert
- Succeeded by: Ernie Fletcher

Personal details
- Party: Democratic

Leslie Combs Trapp (born September 18, 1954) is an American politician from Kentucky who was a member of the Kentucky House of Representatives from 1993 to 1995. Trapp was elected in 1992 after incumbent Republican representative Pat Freibert retired. In 1994 he was defeated for reelection by Republican Ernie Fletcher.
