= Bill Nighbert =

American politician (1951–2021)

Charles William "Bill" Nighbert (21 June 1951 – 21 January 2021) was a Republican government official in the U.S. state of Kentucky.

== Career ==
Nighbert served as mayor of Williamsburg, Kentucky for three terms. In 2003 he strongly supported the campaign of Ernie Fletcher for Governor of Kentucky, supporting Fletcher politically and with financial contributions.

When Republican Governor of Kentucky Ernie Fletcher was elected and took office in 2003, Nighbert joined the administration as Deputy Commissioner for the Governor's Office for Local Development (GOLD). That office gave millions of dollars in grant money to local government units. One of the offices in GOLD was Local Initiatives for a New Kentucky (LINK).

Nighbert moved to the Kentucky Transportation Cabinet, serving as Commissioner for the Department of Intergovernmental Programs there. Nighbert's duties including allocating over $200 million in road funding for cities and counties.

In March 2005 Governor Fletcher named Nighbert as acting Secretary for the Transportation Cabinet. In November 2005 Fletcher announced that Nighbert was given a full appointment as Secretary of the Transportation Cabinet.

Nighbert was involved in a number of controversies related to his term in Kentucky government. He was a party in a suit regarding workplace threats, and was a defendant in a bid rigging investigation at the Kentucky Department of Transportation. However, he was found not guilty of the bid rigging charges in 2010.

He died on January 21, 2021.
