= Dan Druen =

Dan Druen was a Kentucky Transportation Cabinet official in the administration of Republican Governor of Kentucky Ernie Fletcher. Druen joined the Fletcher administration in 2004 and was appointed to the post of Deputy Commissioner of the Department of Administrative Services. Druen was later appointed to policy advisor and Commissioner of the Department of Administrative Services.

== Background ==
Dan Druen attended the University of the District of Columbia, receiving degrees in Political Science and Mortuary Science.

classes of Washington D.C. During his tenure, Druen participated in the funeral services of Justice Harry Blackmun, The Washington Post editor Katharine Graham, General Benjamin O. Davis, Jr. and many others.

== Fletcher Administration ==
With the support of U.S. Senator Mitch McConnell, Druen was hired into the administration of Governor of Kentucky Ernie Fletcher. Fletcher was the first Republican to be elected governor in Kentucky since 1967. Druen was hired in the Kentucky Transportation Cabinet in 2004 and was appointed to the post of Deputy Commissioner of the Department of Administrative Services. Druen was later appointed to policy advisor and Commissioner of the Department of Administrative Services.

Former Transportation Cabinet commissioner Dan Druen tried to influence a witness and shredded or altered documents that had been subpoenaed, a special grand jury charged in 2005.

The 21 felony counts returned against Druen are the most serious charges levied during the two-month investigation of personnel practices in Gov. Ernie Fletcher's administration.

Druen, who was asked to resign as commissioner of administrative services in the Transportation Cabinet, was previously charged with 13 misdemeanor personnel violations and a felony count of witness tampering.

The new witness tampering charge alleges Druen tried to influence the testimony of his former assistant, Cheryl Casey. Casey made her fourth appearance before the grand jury before the indictments were returned.

The 20 different charges of evidence tampering allege Druen "destroyed, mutilated, concealed or altered physical evidence" by "shredding of documentary evidence," which had been subpoenaed by the grand jury. The charges allege Druen destroyed the evidence between May 19 and May 25, 2005, which was just as the special grand jury investigation was ramping up.

Prosecutor Scott Crawford-Sutherland said the charges against Druen are all Class D felonies, each punishable by up to five years in prison.
