= Jack Trevey =

American politician (1933–1990)

Member of the Kentucky Senate from the 12th district
- In office January 10, 1979 – June 28, 1990
- Preceded by: Larry J. Hopkins
- Succeeded by: Timothy N. Philpot

Member of the Kentucky House of Representatives from the 78th district
- In office January 1, 1978 – January 10, 1979
- Preceded by: Larry J. Hopkins
- Succeeded by: Pat Freibert

Personal details
- Born: May 2, 1933
- Died: June 28, 1990 (aged 57)
- Party: Republican

John Edwin "Jack" Trevey (May 2, 1933 – June 28, 1990) was an American politician from Kentucky who was a member of the Kentucky House of Representatives from 1978 to 1979, and the Kentucky Senate from 1979 until his death in June 1990. Trevey was first elected to the house in 1977, after incumbent representative Larry J. Hopkins ran for the senate. After Hopkins was elected to the U. S. House in 1978, Trevey won a special election in January 1979 to fill the remainder of Hopkins's senate term. Trevey won reelection to the senate in 1981 and 1986, and was running for reelection at the time of his death of a heart attack in June 1990.
