= Pat Freibert =

American politician (born 1936)

Member of the Kentucky House of Representatives from the 78th district
- In office January 29, 1979 – January 1, 1993
- Preceded by: Jack Trevey
- Succeeded by: Leslie Trapp

Personal details
- Born: 1936 (age 89–90)
- Party: Republican

Pat Freibert (born 1936) is an American politician from Kentucky who was a member of the Kentucky House of Representatives from 1979 to 1993. Freibert was first elected in a January 1979 special election following the election of incumbent representative Jack Trevey to the Kentucky Senate. She did not seek reelection in 1992.
