= Ernie Fletcher =

American politician (born 1952)

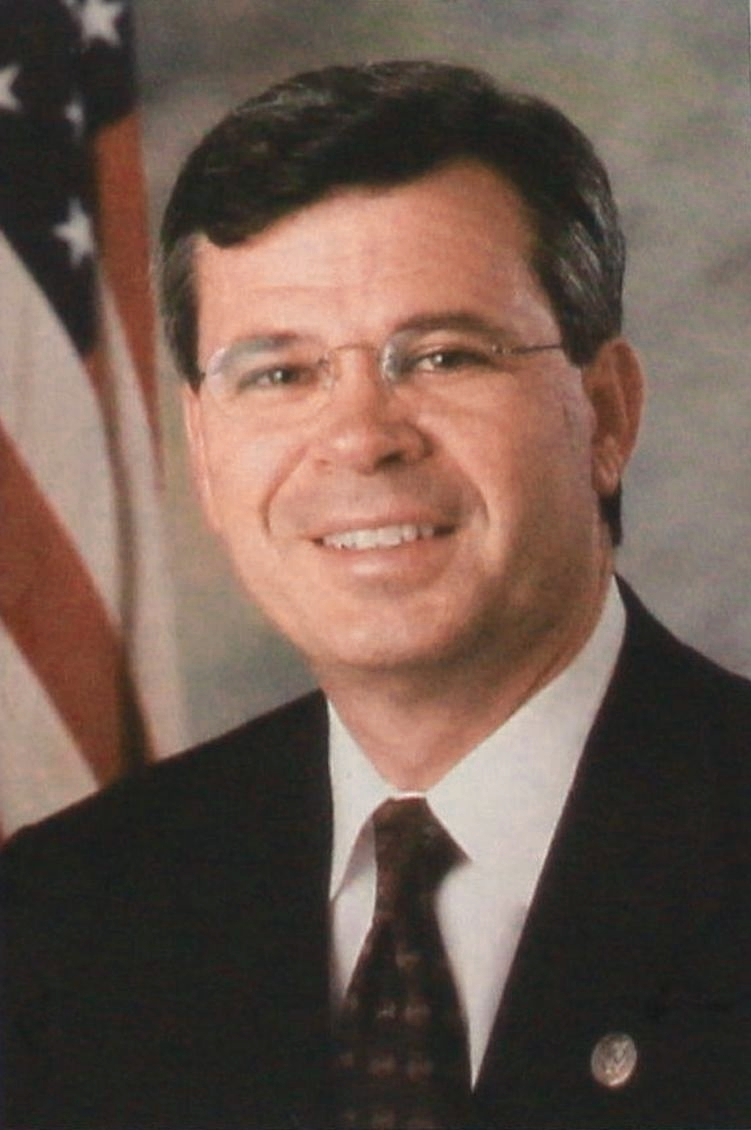
- Official portrait, c. 2001

60th Governor of Kentucky
- In office December 9, 2003 – December 11, 2007
- Lieutenant: Steve Pence
- Preceded by: Paul E. Patton
- Succeeded by: Steve Beshear

Member of the U.S. House of Representatives from Kentucky's 6th district
- In office January 3, 1999 – December 8, 2003
- Preceded by: Scotty Baesler
- Succeeded by: Ben Chandler

Member of the Kentucky House of Representatives from the 78th district
- In office January 1, 1995 – January 1, 1997
- Preceded by: Leslie Trapp
- Succeeded by: Tom McKee (redistricted)

Personal details
- Born: Ernest Lee Fletcher; November 12, 1952 (age 73) Mount Sterling, Kentucky, U.S.
- Party: Republican
- Spouse: Glenna Foster (m. 1970)
- Education: University of Kentucky (BS, MD)

Military service
- Branch/service: United States Air Force
- Years of service: 1974–1980
- Rank: Captain
- Awards: Air Force Commendation Medal; Air Force Outstanding Unit Award

Ernest Lee Fletcher (born November 12, 1952) is an American politician who was the 60th governor of Kentucky from 2003 to 2007. He previously served three consecutive terms in the United States House of Representatives before resigning after being elected governor. A member of the Republican Party, Fletcher was a family practice physician and a Baptist lay minister and is the second physician to be elected Governor of Kentucky; the first was Luke P. Blackburn in 1879. He was also the first Republican governor of Kentucky since Louie Nunn left office in 1971.

Fletcher graduated from the University of Kentucky and joined the United States Air Force to pursue his dream of becoming an astronaut. He left the Air Force after budget cuts reduced his squadron's flying time and earned a degree in medicine, hoping to earn a spot as a civilian on a space mission. Deteriorating eyesight eventually ended those hopes, and he entered private practice as a physician and conducted services as a Baptist lay minister. He became active in politics and was elected to the Kentucky House of Representatives in 1994. Two years later he ran for a seat in the U.S. House of Representatives, but lost to incumbent Scotty Baesler. When Baesler retired to run for a seat in the U.S. Senate, Fletcher again ran for the congressional seat and defeated Democratic state senator Ernesto Scorsone. He soon became one of the House Republican caucus's leaders regarding health care legislation, particularly the Patients' Bill of Rights.

Fletcher was elected governor in 2003 over state Attorney General Ben Chandler. Early in his term, Fletcher achieved some savings to the state by reorganizing the executive branch. He proposed an overhaul to the state tax code in 2004, but was unable to get it passed through the General Assembly. When Republicans in the state senate insisted on tying the reforms to the state budget, the legislature adjourned without passing either and the state operated under an executive spending plan drafted by Fletcher until 2005, when both the budget and the reforms were passed.

Later in 2005, Attorney General Greg Stumbo, the state's highest-ranking Democrat, launched an investigation into whether the Fletcher administration's hiring practices violated the state's merit system. A grand jury returned several indictments against members of Fletcher's staff, and eventually against Fletcher himself. Fletcher issued pardons for anyone on his staff implicated in the investigation, but did not pardon himself. Though the investigation was ended by an agreement between Fletcher and Stumbo in late 2006, it continued to overshadow Fletcher's re-election bid in 2007. After turning back a challenge in the Republican primary by former Congresswoman Anne Northup, Fletcher lost the general election to Democrat Steve Beshear. After his term as governor, he returned to the medical field as founder and CEO of Alton Healthcare. He is married and has two adult children.

== Early life ==
Ernest Lee Fletcher was born in Mount Sterling, Kentucky, on November 12, 1952. He was the third of four children born to Harold Fletcher Sr. and his wife, Marie. The family owned a farm and operated a general store near the community of Means. Harold Fletcher also worked for Columbia Gas. When Ernie was three weeks old, Harold was transferred to Huntington, West Virginia. Two years later, the Fletchers returned to Robertson County, Kentucky, where they lived until Ernie Fletcher began the first grade. The family moved once more and finally settled in Lexington.

Fletcher attended Lafayette High School in Lexington, where he was a member of the National Beta Club. During his senior year, he was an all-state saxophone player and was elected prom king. After graduating in 1970, he enrolled at the University of Kentucky. He pledged and became a member of the Delta Tau Delta fraternity. After his freshman year, he married his high school sweetheart, Glenna Foster. The couple had two children, Rachael and Ben, and four grandchildren.

Fletcher aspired to become an astronaut, and joined the Air Force Reserve Officer Training Corps. In 1974, he earned a Bachelor of Science degree in mechanical engineering, graduating with top honors. After graduation, he joined the U.S. Air Force. After flight training in Oklahoma, he was stationed in Alaska where he served as a F-4E Aircraft commander and NORAD Alert Force commander. During the Cold War, his duties included commanding squadrons to intercept Soviet military aircraft. In 1980, as budget cutbacks were reducing his squadron's flying time, Fletcher turned down a regular commission in the Air Force. He left the Air Force with the rank of captain, having received the Air Force Commendation Medal and the Outstanding Unit Award.

Fletcher enrolled in the University of Kentucky College of Medicine, hoping that a medical degree, along with a military background, would earn him a civilian spot on a space mission. In 1984, he graduated medical school with a Doctor of Medicine degree, but his deteriorating eyesight forced him to abandon his dreams of becoming an astronaut.

In 1983, the Lexington Primitive Baptist church that Fletcher attended ordained him as a lay minister. In 1984, he opened a family medical practice in Lexington. Along with former classmate Dr. James D. B. George, he co-founded the South Lexington Family Physicians in 1987. For two years, he concurrently held the title of chief executive officer of the Saint Joseph Medical Foundation, an organization that solicits private gifts to Saint Joseph Regional Medical Center in Lexington. In 1989, Fletcher's church called him to become its unpaid pastor, but over the years, he grew to question some of the church's doctrines, desiring it to become more evangelistic. Consequently, he left the Primitive Baptist denomination in 1994 and joined the Porter Memorial Baptist Church, a Southern Baptist congregation.

== Legislative career ==
Through his church ministry, Fletcher became acquainted with a group of social conservatives that gained control of the Fayette County Republican Party in 1990. (Fayette County and the city of Lexington operate under the merged Lexington-Fayette Urban County Government). Fletcher accepted an invitation to become a member of the county Republican committee. In 1994, he was elected to the Kentucky House of Representatives, defeating incumbent Democrat Leslie Trapp. He represented Kentucky's 78th District and served on the Kentucky Commission on Poverty and the Task Force on Higher Education. He was also chosen by Governor Paul E. Patton to assist with reforming the state's health-care system.

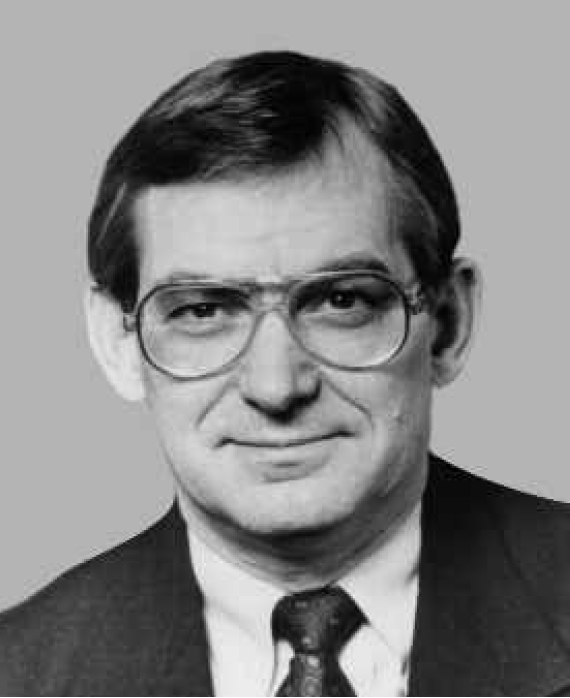
Scotty Baesler defeated Fletcher for a congressional seat in 1996.

As a result of legislative redistricting in 1996, Fletcher's district was consolidated with the one represented by fellow Republican Stan Cave. Rather than challenge a member of his own party, Fletcher decided to run for a seat representing Kentucky's 6th District in the U.S. House of Representatives later that year. After winning a three-way Republican primary by 4 votes over his closest opponent, he was defeated by incumbent Democrat Scotty Baesler by just over 25,000 votes. In 1998, Baesler resigned his seat to run for the U.S. Senate seat vacated due to the retirement of Senator Wendell H. Ford. Fletcher won the Republican primary for Baesler's seat by a wide margin. In the general election, Fletcher faced Democrat Ernesto Scorsone. The Lexington Herald-Leader billed the race as "a classic joust between the left and the right". Fletcher was strongly opposed to abortion, advocated a "flatter, fairer, simpler" tax system, and called for returning most federal education funding to local communities. Scorsone supported abortion rights, called a flat tax "too regressive", and favored national educational testing and standards. Fletcher defeated Scorsone by a vote of 104,046 to 90,033, with third-party candidate W. S. Krogdahl garnering 1,839 votes.

Within months of arriving in Washington, D.C., Fletcher was selected as the leadership liaison for the 17-member freshman class of Republican legislators. He was appointed to the Committee on Education and Workforce, and John Boehner, chair of the committee's employer/employee relations subcommittee, chose Fletcher as his vice-chair. The committee's purpose is to oversee the rules for employer-paid health plans, among other issues, and although it is rare for a freshman legislator to attain a committee leadership post, Boehner cited Fletcher's experience in the medical field and work on reforming the Kentucky health care system as reasons for the appointment. Fletcher also served as a member of the House Committees on the Budget and Agriculture. In June 1999, he sponsored an amendment to a youth violence bill that allowed school districts to use federal funds to develop curricula which included elements designed to promote and enhance students' moral character; the amendment passed 422–1. Later, Fletcher was assigned to the Committee on Energy and Commerce and was selected as chairman of the Policy Subcommittee on Health.

During the debate over the proposed Patients' Bill of Rights legislation, Fletcher opposed a Democratic proposal that would have allowed individuals to sue their health maintenance organizations (HMOs), favoring instead a more limited bill drafted by Republican leadership that expanded the patient's ability to appeal HMO decisions. Many doctors in the Republican legislative caucus felt their party's bill did not go far enough; Fletcher and Tennessee Senator Bill Frist were notable exceptions. Fletcher's position cost him the support of the Kentucky Medical Association (KMA). After contributing to his campaign against Scorsone in 1998, KMA backed Scotty Baesler's bid to regain his old seat from Fletcher in 2000. However, Baesler only captured 35 percent of the vote to Fletcher's 53 percent. The remaining 12 percent went to third-party candidate Gatewood Galbraith.

After the 2000 election, Fletcher crafted a compromise bill that allowed patients to sue their HMOs in federal court, capped pain and suffering awards at $500,000, and eliminated punitive damage awards. Despite an eventual compromise allowing patient lawsuits to go to state courts under certain circumstances and heavy lobbying in favor of Fletcher's bill by President George W. Bush, the House refused to pass it, favoring an alternative proposal by Georgia's Charlie Norwood that was less restrictive on patient lawsuits.

Fletcher faced no major-party opposition in his re-election bid in 2002 after the only Democrat in the race, 24-year-old Roy Miller Cornett Jr., withdrew his candidacy. Independent Gatewood Galbraith again made the race; Libertarian Mark Gailey also mounted a challenge. In the final vote tally, Fletcher received 115,522 votes to Galbraith's 41,853 and Gailey's 3,313.

== 2003 gubernatorial election ==
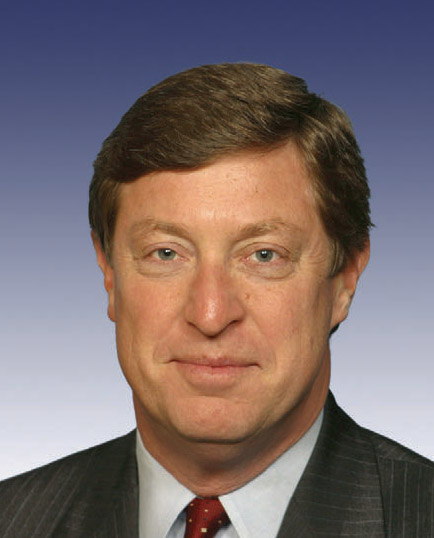
Ben Chandler, Fletcher's Democratic opponent in the 2003 gubernatorial race

In 2002, Fletcher was encouraged by Senator Mitch McConnell, the leader of Kentucky's Republican Party, to run for governor and formed an exploratory committee the same year. On December 2, 2002, he announced that he would run on a ticket with McConnell aide Hunter Bates. Early in 2003, a Republican college student named Curtis Shain challenged Bates' candidacy on grounds that he did not meet the residency requirements set forth for the lieutenant governor in the state constitution. Under the constitution, candidates for both governor and lieutenant governor must be citizens of the state for at least six years prior to the election. From August 1995 to February 2002, Bates and his wife rented an apartment in Alexandria, Virginia while Bates was working for a law firm in Washington, D.C., and later, as McConnell's chief of staff. Bob Heleringer, a former state representative from suburban Louisville and the running mate of Republican gubernatorial candidate Steve Nunn, joined the suit as a plaintiff. In March 2003, an Oldham County judge ruled that Bates had not established residency in Kentucky. He cited the fact that from 1995 to 2002, Bates held a Virginia driver's license, paid Virginia income taxes, and "regularly" slept in his apartment in Virginia. Bates did not appeal the ruling because by allowing the judge to declare a vacancy on the ballot, Fletcher was able to name a replacement running mate, an option that would not have been afforded him had Bates withdrawn.

Fletcher chose Steve Pence, United States Attorney for the Western District of Kentucky, as his new running mate. Heleringer continued his legal challenge, first claiming that Bates' ineligibility should have invalidated the entire Fletcher/Bates ticket and then that Fletcher should not have been allowed to name a replacement for an unqualified candidate. The Kentucky Supreme Court rejected that argument on May 7, 2003, though the justices' reasons for doing so varied and the final opinion conceded that "[t]his is a close case on the law, and Heleringer has presented legal issues worthy of this court's time and attention". The state Board of Elections instructed all county clerks to count absentee ballots cast for Fletcher and Bates as votes for Fletcher and Pence.

In the Republican primary, Fletcher received 53 percent of the vote, besting Nunn, Jefferson County judge/executive Rebecca Jackson, and state senator Virgil Moore. In the Democratic primary, Attorney General Ben Chandler defeated Speaker of the House Jody Richards. Chandler, the grandson of former governor A. B. "Happy" Chandler, was hurt in the closing days of the primary campaign when a third challenger, businessman Bruce Lunsford, dropped out of the race and endorsed Richards. Chandler won the Democratic primary by just 3.7 percentage points and was forced to reorganize his campaign. Consequently, Fletcher entered the general election as the favorite.

Due to the funding from the Republican Governors Association, Fletcher held a two-to-one fundraising advantage over Chandler. A sex-for-favors scandal that ensnared sitting Democratic governor Paul Patton, as well as a predicted $710 million shortfall in the upcoming budget, damaged the entire Democratic slate of candidates' chances for election. Fletcher capitalized on these issues, promising to "clean up the mess" in Frankfort, and won the election by 109,125 votes. In all, Republicans captured four of the seven statewide constitutional offices in 2003; Trey Grayson was elected Secretary of State and Richie Farmer was elected Commissioner of Agriculture. Fletcher resigned his seat in the House on December 8, 2003, and assumed the governorship the following day. Fletcher's victory made him the first Republican elected governor of Kentucky since 1971, and his margin of victory was the largest ever for a Republican in a Kentucky gubernatorial election.

== Governor of Kentucky ==
Fletcher made economic development a priority, and Kentucky ranked fourth among all U.S. states in number of jobs created during his administration. One of his first actions as governor was to reorganize the executive branch, condensing the number of cabinet positions from fourteen to nine. He dissolved the former Kentucky Horse Racing Commission and instead created the Kentucky Horse Racing Authority to promote and regulate the state's horse racing industry. To improve the state's management of Medicaid, he rolled back some of the program's requirements and unveiled a plan to focus on improvements in care, benefit management, and technology. Fletcher also launched "Get Healthy Kentucky!," an initiative to promote healthier lifestyles for Kentuckians.

=== 2004 state budget dispute ===
Throughout Fletcher's term, the Kentucky Senate was controlled by Republicans, while Democrats held a majority in the state House of Representatives. Consequently, Fletcher had difficulty getting legislation enacted in the General Assembly. Early in the 2004 legislative session, he presented a plan for tax reform that he claimed was "revenue neutral" and would "modernize" the state tax code. The plan was drafted with input from seven Democratic legislators in the House, none of them in leadership roles, leading to claims that Fletcher was trying to circumvent House leadership. As the session wore on, Republicans insisted on tying the tax reform package to the proposed state budget, while Democrats wanted to vote on the measures separately. Despite last minute attempts at a compromise as the session drew to a close, the Assembly passed neither the tax reform package nor a state budget. The contentious session ended with only a few accomplishments, including passage of a fetal homicide law, an anti-price gouging measure, and a law barring the state public service commission from regulating broadband Internet providers beyond what restrictions were put in place by the Federal Communications Commission.

The 2004 session marked the second consecutive session in which the General Assembly had failed to pass a biennial budget; the first occurred in 2002 under Governor Patton. When the fiscal year ended without a budget in place, responsibility for state expenditures fell to Fletcher. As it had been in 2002, spending was governed by an executive spending plan created by the governor. Democratic Attorney General Greg Stumbo filed suit asking for a determination on the extent of Fletcher's ability to spend without legislative approval. A similar suit, filed after the 2002 session ended in deadlock, was rendered moot when the legislature passed a budget in a special session prior to the conclusion of the lawsuit. A judicial review by a Franklin County circuit court judge approved Fletcher's spending plan but forbade spending on new capital projects and programs. In late December 2004, a judge ruled that Fletcher's plan could continue to govern spending until the end of the fiscal year on June 30, 2005, but "thereafter" executive spending was to be limited to "funds demonstrated to be for limited and specific essential services."

On May 19, 2005, the Kentucky Supreme Court issued a 4–3 decision stating that the General Assembly had acted unconstitutionally by not passing a budget and that Fletcher had acted outside his constitutional authority by spending money not specifically appropriated by the legislature. The majority opinion rejected the lower court's exception for "specific essential services", saying "If the legislative department fails to appropriate funds deemed sufficient to operate the executive department at a desired level of services, the executive department must serve the citizenry as best it can with what it is given. If the citizenry deems those services insufficient, it will exercise its own constitutional power – the ballot." Chief Justice Joseph Lambert dissented, claiming the executive spending plan was necessary. Two other justices, in a separate opinion, disagreed with the majority that federal and state constitutional mandates should still be funded in the absence of a budget. In their dissent, they argued that the threat of a government shutdown would act as an impetus for the General Assembly to engage in timely budget-making. The decision took no retroactive steps to change the actions it ruled unconstitutional, but it served as a precedent for any future cases of budgetary gridlock.

=== Legislative interim and 2005 legislative session ===
In June 2004, Fletcher's aircraft caused a security scare that triggered a brief evacuation of the U.S. Capitol and Supreme Court building. Shortly after takeoff en route to memorial services for former president Ronald Reagan, the transponder on Fletcher's plane malfunctioned, leading officials at Reagan National Airport to report an unauthorized aircraft entering restricted airspace. Two F-15 fighters were dispatched to investigate, and Fletcher's plane was escorted to its destination by two Blackhawk helicopters. The plane, a 33-year-old Beechcraft King Air, was the oldest of its model still in operation. An investigation by the Federal Aviation Administration (FAA) found that the crew of Fletcher's plane maintained radio contact with air traffic officials and received clearance to enter the restricted air space. The investigation determined that miscommunication by air traffic controllers sparked the panic, and in the aftermath of the incident, the FAA adopted policies to prevent future errors of a similar nature.

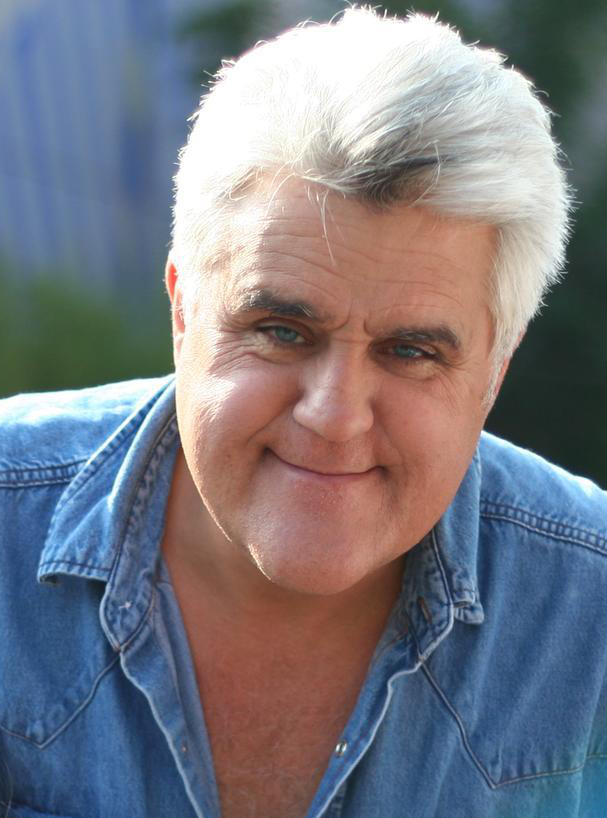
Jay Leno's jokes about Fletcher's effort to create a brand for Kentucky prompted an appearance by Fletcher on The Tonight Show

In July 2004, Fletcher announced a plan to unify the state's branding to improve its public perception. Shortly after the announcement, late-night comedians Craig Kilborn and Jay Leno made some tongue-in-cheek suggestions for the new slogan on The Late Late Show and The Tonight Show, respectively. In response, Fletcher wrote a letter to both comedians taking exception to the jokes and was invited to appear on both programs. Citing Leno's larger audience and earlier time slot, Fletcher agreed to appear on The Tonight Show, where he presented Leno with a Louisville Slugger baseball bat and traded jocular barbs about the relative advantages of Kentucky and Los Angeles where The Tonight Show is taped. Eventually, four slogans were chosen to be voted on online as well as at interstate travel centers. In December 2004, "Kentucky: Unbridled Spirit" was chosen as the winning slogan and was printed on road signs, state documents, and souvenirs. A 2007 study determined that 88.9% of Kentuckians could correctly identify the slogan and its logo. Further, 64% of those surveyed across a ten-state region recognized the slogan and logo, higher than any other brand tested in the study.

In the second half of 2004, Fletcher proposed changes to the health benefits of state workers and retirees. Fletcher's plan provided discounts for members who engaged in healthier behavior, which he called a transition from a sickness initiative to a wellness initiative. Acknowledging that out-of-pocket expenses would rise, Fletcher proposed a 1% salary increase to offset the additional costs. State employees, particularly public school teachers, broadly opposed Fletcher's plan, and the Kentucky Educators Association called for an indefinite strike, to begin October 27, 2004. To address the opposition, Fletcher called a special session of the legislature to begin October 5, 2004. Although the state was still operating under an executive spending plan, Fletcher did not include the budget or his tax reform proposal in the session's agenda, a move praised by both parties, allowing them to focus only on concerns over the health plan. In a fifteen-day session, the General Assembly passed a plan that allocated $190 million more to health insurance for state workers and restored many of the most popular benefits in the previous insurance plan. Immediately after the session adjourned, the Kentucky Educators Association voted to cancel their proposed strike.

On November 8, 2004, Fletcher signed a death warrant for Thomas Clyde Bowling, who was convicted of a double murder in 1990 and sentenced to death by lethal injection. A group of doctors requested an investigation by the Kentucky Board of Medical Licensure to determine whether Fletcher's medical license should be revoked for that action. Kentucky requires doctors to follow the guidelines of the American Medical Association, which forbid doctors from participating in an execution. On January 13, 2005, the Board of Medical Licensure found that Fletcher was acting in his capacity as governor, not as a doctor, when he signed the warrant and ruled that his license was not subject to forfeiture by that action.

During the General Assembly's 2005 session, Fletcher again proposed his tax reform plan, and late in the session, both houses passed it. The plan raised sin taxes on cigarettes and alcohol, as well as upping taxes on satellite television service and motel rooms. Businesses were also subjected to a gross receipts tax. In exchange, corporate taxes were lowered, as were income taxes for individuals who earned less than $75,000 annually; 300,000 low-wage earners were dropped from the income tax rolls altogether. The Assembly also passed a budget for the remainder of the biennium, abolished the state's public campaign finance laws, and passed new school nutrition guidelines.

=== Merit system investigation ===
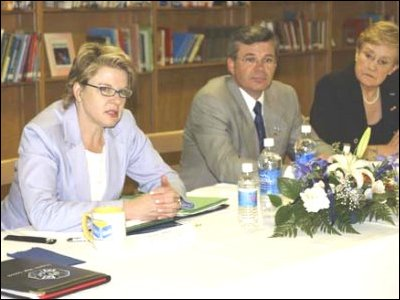
Fletcher with U.S. Secretary of Education Margaret Spellings in 2005

In May 2005, Attorney General Stumbo began an investigation of allegations that the Fletcher administration circumvented the state merit system for hiring, promoting, demoting and firing state employees by basing decisions on employees' political loyalties. The investigation was prompted by a 276-page complaint filed by Douglas W. Doerting, the assistant personnel director for the Kentucky Transportation Cabinet. Fletcher, who was on a trade mission in Japan when news of the investigation broke, conceded via telephone news conference that his office may have made "mistakes" with regard to hiring that stemmed from not having a formal process for handling employment recommendations. Upon his return from Japan, Fletcher denied that the "mistakes" by his administration were illegal and called the investigation by Stumbo "the beginning of the 2007 governor's race", an allusion to Stumbo's potential candidacy in 2007. Stumbo denied any plans to run for governor in 2007, although he eventually became gubernatorial candidate Bruce Lunsford's running mate in the election, losing in the Democratic primary.

A grand jury was empaneled in June 2005 to investigate the charges against Fletcher's administration. By August, the jury had returned indictments against nine administration officials, including state Republican Party chairman Darrell Brock Jr. and acting Transportation Secretary Bill Nighbert. All of the indictments were for misdemeanors such as conspiracy except those against Administrative Services Commissioner Dan Druen, who was charged with 22 felonies (20 counts of physical evidence tampering and 2 counts of witness tampering) in addition to 13 misdemeanors. On August 29, Fletcher granted pardons to the nine indicted administration officials and issued a blanket pardon for "any and all persons who have committed, or may be accused of committing, any offense" with regard to the investigation. Fletcher exempted himself from the blanket pardon. The next day, Fletcher was called to testify before the grand jury, but refused to answer any questions, invoking his Fifth Amendment right against self-incrimination.

In mid-September, after Fletcher issued the pardons, a Courier-Journal poll found Fletcher's approval rating at 38 percent, tying the lowest rating reached by his predecessor, Paul E. Patton, during the sex scandal that tarnished his administration. On September 14, 2005, Fletcher fired nine employees, including four of the nine he pardoned two weeks earlier. The firings were praised by Fletcher critic Charles Wells of the Kentucky Association of State Employees, who said: "When all else fails, the governor did the right thing." However, Democratic state senator and former governor Julian Carroll criticized Fletcher for not firing the indicted officials when he issued the pardons. Fletcher also called for the firing of state Republican Party chair Darrell Brock Jr. due to Brock's role in the merit scandal. The state Republican executive committee met on September 17, but did not act on Fletcher's call to fire Brock.

The grand jury continued its investigation, issuing five more indictments after Fletcher issued his blanket pardon. Two were returned against members of Fletcher's staff, and two were against unpaid advisors to Fletcher. The fifth was issued against Acting Secretary Nighbert for retaliation against a whistleblower. Only the additional charge against Nighbert was alleged to have occurred after Fletcher issued the pardon. On October 24, 2005, Fletcher filed a motion asking Franklin Circuit Court Judge William Graham to order the grand jury to stop issuing indictments for offenses that occurred prior to the blanket pardon; only the names of indicted officials could be included in the jury's final report. On November 16, Graham ruled that the grand jury could continue issuing indictments, but in a separate ruling, dismissed the indictments against Fletcher's staff and volunteer advisors on grounds that they were covered by the pardon. Graham did not rule on the latest indictment against Nighbert. The Kentucky Court of Appeals affirmed Graham's ruling on December 16. Immediately after the Court of Appeals' ruling, Fletcher announced his intent to appeal the ruling to the Kentucky Supreme Court.

=== 2006 legislative session ===
On February 12, 2006, shortly after the beginning of the General Assembly's legislative session, Fletcher was hospitalized with abdominal pain. Doctors at St. Joseph East hospital in Lexington found a gallstone in his common bile duct and also diagnosed him with an inflamed pancreas and gallbladder disease. After surgery to remove the gallbladder, Fletcher developed a blood infection that slowed his recovery, but was discharged from the hospital on March 1. Days later, he returned to St. Joseph's with a blood clot which had to be dissolved, resulting in another five-day stay in the hospital. Fletcher staffers insisted that his absence did not have a negative impact on his ability to get legislation passed during the session. A right-to-work law and a repeal of the state's prevailing wage law – both advocated by Fletcher – failed early in the session, but both had been considered unlikely to pass before the session started. Among the bills that did pass the session were a mandatory seat belt law, a law requiring children under 16 years old to wear a helmet when operating an all-terrain vehicle, and legislation allowing the Ten Commandments to be posted on Capitol grounds in a historical context.

The Assembly passed a biennial budget, but did not allow enough time in the session to reconvene and potentially override any of Fletcher's vetoes. In an attempt to avoid "excessive debt", Fletcher used his line-item veto to trim $370 million in projects from the budget passed by the Assembly. Although falling far short of his initial prediction of vetoing $938 million, Fletcher used the line-item veto more than any other governor in state history. One project not vetoed by Fletcher was $11 million for the University of the Cumberlands to build a pharmacy school. LGBT rights groups had asked Fletcher to veto the funds because the university, a private Baptist school, had expelled a student for being openly gay.

One of Fletcher's priorities that was not resolved during the session was the correction of unintended tax increases on businesses that resulted from the tax reform plan passed in 2005. Fletcher called a special legislative session for mid-June so that the legislature could amend the plan and also authorize tax breaks designed to lure a proposed FutureGen power plant to Henderson. Republican Senate President David L. Williams asked Fletcher to include tax breaks for other businesses as well, but Fletcher insisted on a sparse legislative agenda. The session convened for five days and passed the tax breaks and amended tax reform plan unanimously in both houses. Fletcher applauded the legislature's efficiency.

=== Investigation concludes ===
As the Kentucky Supreme Court prepared to hear Fletcher's appeal on whether the grand jury could continue to indict people covered by his blanket pardon, two of the court's seven justices recused themselves from the case, citing conflicts of interest. Kentucky's constitution provides that, in the case of more than one recusal on the court, the governor is to appoint special justices to replace them. Accordingly, Fletcher named two replacements, but one of those – Circuit Judge Jeffrey Burdette – declined to serve on grounds that he had contributed to Fletcher's 2003 gubernatorial campaign. Fletcher then named another special justice to replace Burdette, consistent with a precedent set by former Democratic Governor Brereton Jones. Stumbo challenged this third appointment, claiming that Burdette's refusal to serve created only one vacancy on the court, and that the case could be tried with six justices. The Kentucky Supreme Court sustained Stumbo's complaint. In a 4–2 ruling issued May 18, 2006, the Kentucky Supreme Court barred the grand jury from issuing further indictments against individuals covered by Fletcher's blanket pardon, reversing the Court of Appeals. The ruling did not affect indictments for crimes allegedly committed after the pardon was issued. The Supreme Court also held that the grand jury could issue a general report of its findings at the conclusion of its investigation, but left open the question of whether the names of unindicted individuals could appear in the report. A later decision by the Court of Appeals found that unindicted individuals could not be named in the report.

Just prior to the Supreme Court's ruling, the grand jury handed down indictments against Fletcher for three misdemeanors – conspiracy, official misconduct, and political discrimination. Fletcher did not appear at his arraignment on June 9 because he was on vacation in Florida; his attorney entered "not guilty" pleas to all three charges on his behalf. On August 11, 2006, Special Judge David E. Melcher ruled that because the personnel violations were allegedly committed while Fletcher was acting in his official capacity as governor, he was protected by executive immunity and could not be prosecuted until he left office. Melcher asked that the two sides work together to reach a settlement in the case. On August 24, Fletcher and Stumbo announced such an agreement. Under the settlement, Fletcher acknowledged that evidence "strongly indicate[d] wrongdoing by his administration" but did not admit any wrongdoing personally. Fletcher also acknowledged that Stumbo's prosecution of the case "[was a] necessary and proper [exercise] of his constitutional duty" and ensured that abuses of the merit system would be ended. In addition to dropping the charges against Fletcher, Stumbo conceded that any violations by Fletcher's administration were "without malice". Four members of the state Personnel Board who were appointed by Fletcher were required to step down. Their replacements would be chosen by Fletcher from a list provided by Stumbo.

The grand jury issued its report on the investigation in October 2006, and a judge ordered it released to the public on November 16. The report categorized the Fletcher administration's actions as "a widespread and coordinated plan to violate merit hiring laws." It charged that "This investigation was not about a few people here and there who made some mistakes as Governor Ernie Fletcher had claimed," and lamented that the blanket pardon issued by Fletcher, coupled with Fletcher taking the Fifth, made it "difficult to get to the bottom of the facts of this case....As a result, [the grand jury was] in part forced to rely on documentary evidence to piece together the facts of the case." Fletcher opined that the allegations in the report were inconsistent with his settlement with Stumbo, which acknowledged that Fletcher's administration acted "without malice."

== 2007 gubernatorial election ==
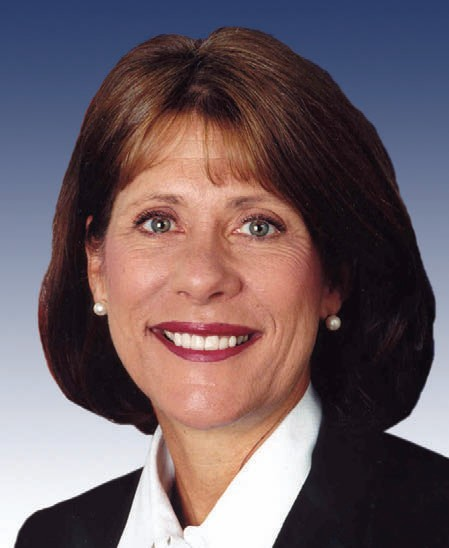
Anne Northup challenged Fletcher in the 2007 Republican gubernatorial primary.

In early 2005, Fletcher announced his intent to run for re-election. Shortly after Fletcher was indicted by the grand jury in 2006, Lieutenant Governor Pence announced that he would not be Fletcher's running mate during his re-election bid. Fletcher asked for Pence's immediate resignation as lieutenant governor. Pence declined, but did tender his resignation as head of the Justice Cabinet. Fletcher named his executive secretary, Robbie Rudolph, as his new running mate.

Although Fletcher's agreement with Stumbo to end the investigation was announced in late 2006, the scandal continued to plague his re-election bid, and he drew two challengers in the Republican primary – former Third District Congresswoman Anne Northup and multi-millionaire Paducah businessman Billy Harper. Senator Mitch McConnell, the consensus leader of the Kentucky Republican Party, declined to make an endorsement in the primary, but conceded that Northup was "a formidable opponent". Northup campaigned on the idea that Fletcher's involvement in the hiring scandal had made him "unelectable". Northup secured the endorsements of Jim Bunning, Kentucky's other Republican senator, and Lieutenant Governor Pence. In the primary, Fletcher garnered over 50% of the vote and secured the party's nomination. His rival Northup struggled with name recognition and found few areas of support outside the Louisville district she represented in Congress. She garnered 36.5% of the vote, with the remaining 13.4% going to Billy Harper. Democrats nominated former Lieutenant Governor Steve Beshear to challenge Fletcher.

In the midst of the primary campaign, the 2007 General Assembly convened. Among the accomplishments of the session were raising the state's minimum wage to $7.25 per hour, increasing the speed limit on major state highways to 70 mph (110 km/h), and implementing new safety requirements for social workers and coal miners. Additional legislation stalled after negotiations over how to make the state's retirement system solvent reached an impasse. Fletcher indicated that he would consider calling the Assembly into special session later in the year. In July, Fletcher called the session and included 67 items on its agenda. Democrats in the state House of Representatives maintained that none of the items were urgent enough to warrant a special session. They claimed the call was an attempt by Fletcher to boost his sagging poll numbers against Beshear, and the House adjourned after only 90 minutes without acting on any of Fletcher's agenda. Fletcher denied the claims and insisted that a tax incentive program was needed immediately to keep the state in the running for a proposed coal gasification plant to be built by Peabody Energy. After negotiating with legislators, Fletcher called another session for August; the session included only the tax incentive program, which the Assembly passed.

In the general election campaign, Fletcher attempted to make the expansion of casino gambling, rather than the merit system investigation, the central issue. Beshear favored holding a referendum on a constitutional amendment to allow expanded casino gambling in the state, while Fletcher maintained that expanded gambling would bring an increase in crime and societal ills. The gambling issue failed to gain as much traction as the hiring scandal, however, and Beshear defeated Fletcher by 183,779 votes.

After the election, Fletcher founded Alton Healthcare, a consulting firm that helps healthcare providers make efficient use of technology in their practice. He has served as CEO of the company, which is based in Cincinnati, Ohio, since 2008.

== See also ==
- List of Delta Tau Delta members
- List of University of Kentucky alumni
- List of new members of the 106th United States Congress
- List of United States representatives in the 106th Congress
- List of United States representatives in the 107th Congress
- List of United States representatives in the 108th Congress
- List of United States representatives from Kentucky
- List of governors of Kentucky
- List of Christian preachers § Preachers with secular professions
- List of Christian clergy in politics § Baptist

U.S. House of Representatives
Preceded by Scotty Baesler	Member of the U.S. House of Representatives from Kentucky's 6th congressional district 1999–2003	Succeeded by Ben Chandler
Party political offices
Preceded by Peppy Martin	Republican nominee for Governor of Kentucky; 2003, 2007	Succeeded by David Williams
Political offices
Preceded by Paul Patton	Governor of Kentucky; 2003–2007	Succeeded by Steve Beshear
U.S. order of precedence (ceremonial)
Preceded by Paul E. Patton as Former Governor	Order of precedence of the United States	Succeeded by Steve Beshear as Former Governor
