= List of United States senators in the 106th Congress =

This is a complete list of United States senators during the 106th United States Congress listed by seniority from January 3, 1999, to January 3, 2001.

Order of service is based on the commencement of the senator's first term. Behind this is former service as a senator (only giving the senator seniority within their new incoming class), service as vice president, a House member, a cabinet secretary, or a state governor. The final factor is the population of the senator's state.

Senators who were sworn in during the middle of the two-year congressional term (up until the last senator who was not sworn in early after winning the November 2000 election) are listed at the end of the list with no number.

During the 106th Congress, the U.S. Senate had a Republican majority. In this Congress, Tim Hutchinson was the most junior senior senator, until Paul Coverdell's death on July 18, 2000, after which Max Cleland was the most junior senior senator. Ernest Hollings was the most senior junior senator.

== Terms of service ==
Class	Terms of service of senators that expired in years
Class 1	Terms of service of senators that expired in 2001 (AZ, CA, CT, DE, FL, HI, IN, MA, MD, ME, MI, MN, MO, MS, MT, ND, NE, NJ, NM, NV, NY, OH, PA, RI, TN, TX, UT, VA, VT, WA, WV, WI, and WY.)
Class 2	Terms of service of senators that expired in 2003 (AK, AL, AR, CO, DE, GA, IA, ID, IL, KS, KY, LA, MA, ME, MI, MN, MS, MT, NC, NE, NH, NJ, NM, OK, OR, RI, SC, SD, TN, TX, VA, WV, and WY.)
Class 3	Terms of service of senators that expired in 2005 (AK, AL, AR, AZ, CA, CO, CT, FL, GA, HI, IA, ID, IL, IN, KS, KY, LA, MD, MO, NC, ND, NH, NV, NY, OH, OK, OR, PA, SC, SD, UT, VT, WA, and WI.)

== U.S. Senate seniority list ==
U.S. Senate seniority
Rank	Senator (party-state)	Seniority date	Other factors
1	Strom Thurmond (R-SC)	November 7, 1956	
2	Robert Byrd (D-WV)	January 3, 1959	
3	Ted Kennedy (D-MA)	November 7, 1962	
4	Daniel Inouye (D-HI)	January 3, 1963	
5	Fritz Hollings (D-SC)	November 9, 1966	
6	Ted Stevens (R-AK)	December 24, 1968	
7	Bill Roth (R-DE)	January 1, 1971	
8	Jesse Helms (R-NC)	January 3, 1973	North Carolina 12th in population (1970)
9	Pete Domenici (R-NM)	January 3, 1973	New Mexico 37th in population (1970)
10	Joe Biden (D-DE)	January 3, 1973	Delaware 46th in population (1970)
11	Patrick Leahy (D-VT)	January 3, 1975	
12	John Chafee (Note: In Rhode Island, John Chafee (R) was set to retire at the end of this Congress, but died of congestive heart failure on October 24, 1999. He was replaced by his son, Lincoln Chafee (R), who was appointed by Governor Lincoln Almond.) (R-RI)	December 29, 1976	
13	Paul Sarbanes (D-MD)	January 3, 1977	Former member of the U.S. House of Representatives
14	Daniel Patrick Moynihan (D-NY)	January 3, 1977	New York 2nd in population (1970)
15	Richard Lugar (R-IN)	January 3, 1977	Indiana 11th in population (1970)
16	Orrin Hatch (R-UT)	January 3, 1977	Utah 36th in population (1970)
17	Max Baucus (D-MT)	December 15, 1978	
18	Thad Cochran (R-MS)	December 27, 1978	
19	John Warner (R-VA)	January 2, 1979	
20	Carl Levin (D-MI)	January 3, 1979	
21	Chris Dodd (D-CT)	January 3, 1981	Former member of the U.S. House of Representatives (6 years); Connecticut 24th in population (1970)
22	Chuck Grassley (R-IA)	January 3, 1981	Former member of the U.S. House of Representatives (6 years); Iowa 25th in population (1970)
23	Arlen Specter (R-PA)	January 3, 1981	Pennsylvania 3rd in population (1970)
24	Don Nickles (R-OK)	January 3, 1981	Oklahoma 27th in population (1970)
25	Frank Murkowski (R-AK)	January 3, 1981	Alaska 50th in population (1970)
26	Frank Lautenberg (D-NJ)	December 27, 1982	
27	Jeff Bingaman (D-NM)	January 3, 1983	
28	John Kerry (D-MA)	January 2, 1985	
29	Tom Harkin (D-IA)	January 3, 1985	Former member of the U.S. House of Representatives (10 years)
30	Phil Gramm (R-TX)	January 3, 1985	Former member of the U.S. House of Representatives (6 years)
31	Mitch McConnell (R-KY)	January 3, 1985	
32	Jay Rockefeller (D-WV)	January 15, 1985	
33	John Breaux (D-LA)	January 3, 1987	Former member of the U.S. House of Representatives (14 years)
34	Barbara Mikulski (D-MD)	January 3, 1987	Former member of the U.S. House of Representatives (10 years)
35	Richard Shelby (R-AL)	January 3, 1987	Former member of the U.S. House of Representatives (8 years); Alabama 22nd in population (1980)
36	Tom Daschle (D-SD)	January 3, 1987	Former member of the U.S. House of Representatives (8 years); South Dakota 45th in population (1980)
37	John McCain (R-AZ)	January 3, 1987	Former member of the U.S. House of Representatives (4 years); Arizona 29th in population (1980)
38	Harry Reid (D-NV)	January 3, 1987	Former member of the U.S. House of Representatives (4 years); Nevada 43rd in population (1980)
39	Bob Graham (D-FL)	January 3, 1987	Former governor; Florida 7th in population (1980)
40	Kit Bond (R-MO)	January 3, 1987	Former governor; Missouri 15th in population (1980)
41	Kent Conrad (D-ND)	January 3, 1987	
42	Slade Gorton (R-WA)	January 3, 1989	Former senator
43	Trent Lott (R-MS)	January 3, 1989	Former member of the U.S. House of Representatives (16 years)
44	Jim Jeffords (R-VT)	January 3, 1989	Former member of the U.S. House of Representatives (14 years)
45	Connie Mack III (R-FL)	January 3, 1989	Former member of the U.S. House of Representatives (6 years)
46	Richard Bryan (D-NV)	January 3, 1989	Former governor (6 years)
47	Chuck Robb (D-VA)	January 3, 1989	Former governor (4 years); Virginia 14th in population (1980)
48	Bob Kerrey (D-NE)	January 3, 1989	Former governor (4 years); Nebraska 35th in population (1980)
49	Herb Kohl (D-WI)	January 3, 1989	Wisconsin 16th in population (1980)
50	Joe Lieberman (D-CT)	January 3, 1989	Connecticut 25th in population (1980)
51	Conrad Burns (R-MT)	January 3, 1989	Montana 44th in population (1980)
52	Daniel Akaka (D-HI)	May 16, 1990	
53	Bob Smith (R-NH)	December 7, 1990	
54	Larry Craig (R-ID)	January 3, 1991	Former member of the U.S. House of Representatives
55	Paul Wellstone (D-MN)	January 3, 1991	
56	Dianne Feinstein (D-CA)	November 10, 1992	
57	Byron Dorgan (D-ND)	December 15, 1992	
58	Barbara Boxer (D-CA)	January 3, 1993	Former member of the U.S. House of Representatives (10 years)
59	Judd Gregg (R-NH)	January 3, 1993	Former member of the U.S. House of Representatives (8 years)
60	Ben Nighthorse Campbell (R-CO)	January 3, 1993	Former member of the U.S. House of Representatives (6 years)
61	Paul Coverdell (Note: In Georgia, Paul Coverdell (R) died of a cerebral hemorrhage on July 18, 2000. He was replaced by Zell Miller (D), who was appointed by Governor Roy Barnes.) (R-GA)	January 3, 1993	Georgia 11th in population (1990)
62	Russ Feingold (D-WI)	January 3, 1993	Wisconsin 16th in population (1990)
63	Patty Murray (D-WA)	January 3, 1993	Washington 18th in population (1990)
64	Bob Bennett (R-UT)	January 3, 1993	Utah 35th in population (1990)
65	Kay Bailey Hutchison (R-TX)	June 14, 1993	
66	Jim Inhofe (R-OK)	November 17, 1994	
67	Fred Thompson (R-TN)	December 2, 1994	
68	Olympia Snowe (R-ME)	January 3, 1995	Former member of the U.S. House of Representatives (16 years)
69	Mike DeWine (R-OH)	January 3, 1995	Former member of the U.S. House of Representatives (8 years); Ohio 7th in population (1990)
70	Jon Kyl (R-AZ)	January 3, 1995	Former member of the U.S. House of Representatives (8 years); Arizona 24th in population (1990)
71	Craig L. Thomas (R-WY)	January 3, 1995	Former member of the U.S. House of Representatives (6 years)
72	Rick Santorum (R-PA)	January 3, 1995	Former member of the U.S. House of Representatives (4 years)
73	Rod Grams (R-MN)	January 3, 1995	Former member of the U.S. House of Representatives (2 years)
74	John Ashcroft (R-MO)	January 3, 1995	Former governor
75	Spencer Abraham (R-MI)	January 3, 1995	Michigan 8th in population (1990)
76	Bill Frist (R-TN)	January 3, 1995	Tennessee 17th in population (1990)
77	Ron Wyden (D-OR)	February 6, 1996	
78	Sam Brownback (R-KS)	November 7, 1996	
79	Pat Roberts (R-KS)	January 3, 1997	Former member of the U.S. House of Representatives (16 years)
80	Dick Durbin (D-IL)	January 3, 1997	Former member of the U.S. House of Representatives (14 years); Illinois 6th in population (1990)
81	Robert Torricelli (D-NJ)	January 3, 1997	Former member of the U.S. House of Representatives (14 years); New Jersey 9th in population (1990)
82	Tim Johnson (D-SD)	January 3, 1997	Former member of the U.S. House of Representatives (10 years)
83	Wayne Allard (R-CO)	January 3, 1997	Former member of the U.S. House of Representatives (6 years); Colorado 26th in population (1990)
84	Jack Reed (D-RI)	January 3, 1997	Former member of the U.S. House of Representatives (6 years); Rhode Island 43rd in population (1990)
85	Tim Hutchinson (R-AR)	January 3, 1997	Former member of the U.S. House of Representatives (4 years)
86	Max Cleland (D-GA)	January 3, 1997	Georgia 11th in population (1990)
87	Mary Landrieu (D-LA)	January 3, 1997	Louisiana 21st in population (1990)
88	Jeff Sessions (R-AL)	January 3, 1997	Alabama 22nd in population (1990)
89	Gordon H. Smith (R-OR)	January 3, 1997	Oregon 29th in population (1990)
90	Chuck Hagel (R-NE)	January 3, 1997	Nebraska 36th in population (1990)
91	Susan Collins (R-ME)	January 3, 1997	Maine 38th in population (1990)
92	Mike Enzi (R-WY)	January 3, 1997	Wyoming 50th in population (1990)
93	Chuck Schumer (D-NY)	January 3, 1999	Former member of the U.S. House of Representatives (18 years)
94	Jim Bunning (R-KY)	January 3, 1999	Former member of the U.S. House of Representatives (12 years)
95	Mike Crapo (R-ID)	January 3, 1999	Former member of the U.S. House of Representatives (6 years)
96	Blanche Lincoln (D-AR)	January 3, 1999	Former member of the U.S. House of Representatives (4 years)
97	George Voinovich (R-OH)	January 3, 1999	Former governor; Ohio 7th in population (1990)
98	Evan Bayh (D-IN)	January 3, 1999	Former governor; Indiana 14th in population (1990)
99	Peter Fitzgerald (R-IL)	January 3, 1999	Illinois 6th in population (1990)
100	John Edwards (D-NC)	January 3, 1999	North Carolina 10th in population (1990)
	Lincoln Chafee (R-RI)	November 4, 1999	
	Zell Miller (D-GA)	July 27, 2000	

The most senior senators by class were Robert Byrd (D-West Virginia) from Class 1, Strom Thurmond (R-South Carolina) from Class 2, and Daniel Inouye (D-Hawaii) from Class 3.

== See also ==
- 106th United States Congress
- List of United States representatives in the 106th Congress
