= List of United States representatives in the 106th Congress =

This is a complete list of United States representatives during the 106th United States Congress listed by seniority.

As an historical article, the districts and party affiliations listed reflect those during the 106th Congress (January 3, 1999 – January 3, 2001). Seats and party affiliations on similar lists for other congresses will be different for certain members.

Seniority depends on the date on which members were sworn into office. Since many members are sworn in on the same day, subsequent ranking is based on previous congressional service of the individual and then by alphabetical order by the last name of the representative.

Committee chairmanship in the House is often associated with seniority. However, party leadership is typically not associated with seniority.

Note: The "*" indicates that the representative/delegate may have served one or more non-consecutive terms while in the House of Representatives of the United States Congress.

== U.S. House seniority list ==
U.S. House seniority
Rank	Representative	Party	District	Seniority date (Previous service, if any)	No.# of term(s)	Notes
1	John Dingell	D	MI-16	December 13, 1955	23rd term	Dean of the House
2	John Conyers	D	MI-14	January 3, 1965	18th term	
3	Bill Clay	D	MO-01	January 3, 1969	16th term	Left the House in 2001.
4	Dave Obey	D	WI-07	April 1, 1969	16th term	
5	Phil Crane	R	IL-08	November 25, 1969	16th term	
6	Bill Archer	R	TX-07	January 3, 1971	15th term	Left the House in 2001.
7	Charles Rangel	D	NY-15	January 3, 1971	15th term	
8	Floyd Spence	R	SC-02	January 3, 1971	15th term	
9	Bill Young	R	FL-10	January 3, 1971	15th term	
10	George Brown Jr.	D	CA-42	January 3, 1973; Previous service, 1963–1971.	18th term*	Died on July 15, 1999.
11	Benjamin Gilman	R	NY-20	January 3, 1973	14th term	
12	Ralph Regula	R	OH-16	January 3, 1973	14th term	
13	Bud Shuster	R	PA-09	January 3, 1973	14th term	
14	Joe Moakley	D	MA-09	January 3, 1973	14th term	
15	Pete Stark	D	CA-13	January 3, 1973	14th term	
16	Don Young	R	AK-AL	March 6, 1973	14th term	
17	John Murtha	D	PA-12	February 5, 1974	14th term	
18	William F. Goodling	R	PA-19	January 3, 1975	13th term	Left the House in 2001.
19	Henry Hyde	R	IL-06	January 3, 1975	13th term	
20	John LaFalce	D	NY-29	January 3, 1975	13th term	
21	George Miller	D	CA-07	January 3, 1975	13th term	
22	Jim Oberstar	D	MN-08	January 3, 1975	13th term	
23	Henry Waxman	D	CA-29	January 3, 1975	13th term	
24	Ed Markey	D	MA-07	November 2, 1976	13th term	
25	David Bonior	D	MI-10	January 3, 1977	12th term	
26	Norm Dicks	D	WA-06	January 3, 1977	12th term	
27	Dick Gephardt	D	MO-03	January 3, 1977	12th term	
28	Dale Kildee	D	MI-09	January 3, 1977	12th term	
29	Jim Leach	R	IA-01	January 3, 1977	12th term	
30	Nick Rahall	D	WV-03	January 3, 1977	12th term	
31	Ike Skelton	D	MO-04	January 3, 1977	12th term	
32	Bob Stump	R	AZ-03	January 3, 1977	12th term	
33	Bruce Vento	D	MN-04	January 3, 1977	12th term	Died on October 10, 2000.
34	Bob Livingston	R	LA-01	August 27, 1977	12th term	Resigned on March 1, 1999.
35	Doug Bereuter	R	NE-01	January 3, 1979	11th term	
36	Julian Dixon	D	CA-32	January 3, 1979	11th term	Died on December 8, 2000.
37	Martin Frost	D	TX-24	January 3, 1979	11th term	
38	Tony P. Hall	D	OH-03	January 3, 1979	11th term	
39	Jerry Lewis	R	CA-40	January 3, 1979	11th term	
40	Bob Matsui	D	CA-05	January 3, 1979	11th term	
41	Martin Olav Sabo	D	MN-05	January 3, 1979	11th term	
42	Jim Sensenbrenner	R	WI-09	January 3, 1979	11th term	
43	Charles Stenholm	D	TX-17	January 3, 1979	11th term	
44	Bill Thomas	R	CA-21	January 3, 1979	11th term	
45	Tom Petri	R	WI-06	April 3, 1979	11th term	
46	John Porter	R	IL-10	January 22, 1980	11th term	Left the House in 2001.
47	Billy Tauzin	R	LA-03	May 22, 1980	11th term	
48	Thomas J. Bliley Jr.	R	VA-07	January 3, 1981	10th term	Left the House in 2001.
49	William J. Coyne	D	PA-14	January 3, 1981	10th term	
50	David Dreier	R	CA-26	January 3, 1981	10th term	
51	Barney Frank	D	MA-04	January 3, 1981	10th term	
52	Sam Gejdenson	D	CT-02	January 3, 1981	10th term	Left the House in 2001.
53	Ralph Hall	D	TX-04	January 3, 1981	10th term	
54	James V. Hansen	R	UT-01	January 3, 1981	10th term	
55	Duncan L. Hunter	R	CA-52	January 3, 1981	10th term	
56	Tom Lantos	D	CA-12	January 3, 1981	10th term	
57	Bill McCollum	R	FL-08	January 3, 1981	10th term	Left the House in 2001.
58	Hal Rogers	R	KY-05	January 3, 1981	10th term	
59	Marge Roukema	R	NJ-05	January 3, 1981	10th term	
60	Clay Shaw	R	FL-22	January 3, 1981	10th term	
61	Joe Skeen	R	NM-02	January 3, 1981	10th term	
62	Chris Smith	R	NJ-04	January 3, 1981	10th term	
63	Frank Wolf	R	VA-10	January 3, 1981	10th term	
64	Steny Hoyer	D	MD-05	May 19, 1981	10th term	
65	Mike Oxley	R	OH-04	June 25, 1981	10th term	
66	Matthew G. Martínez	D	CA-31	July 13, 1982	10th term	Switched to Republican on July 27, 2000. Left the House in 2001.
67	Herbert H. Bateman	R	VA-01	January 3, 1983	9th term	Died on September 11, 2000.
68	Howard Berman	D	CA-28	January 3, 1983	9th term	
69	Michael Bilirakis	R	FL-09	January 3, 1983	9th term	
70	Sherwood Boehlert	R	NY-23	January 3, 1983	9th term	
71	Robert A. Borski Jr.	D	PA-03	January 3, 1983	9th term	
72	Rick Boucher	D	VA-09	January 3, 1983	9th term	
73	Dan Burton	R	IN-06	January 3, 1983	9th term	
74	Lane Evans	D	IL-17	January 3, 1983	9th term	
75	George Gekas	R	PA-17	January 3, 1983	9th term	
76	Nancy Johnson	R	CT-06	January 3, 1983	9th term	
77	Marcy Kaptur	D	OH-09	January 3, 1983	9th term	
78	John Kasich	R	OH-12	January 3, 1983	9th term	Left the House in 2001.
79	Sander Levin	D	MI-12	January 3, 1983	9th term	
80	Bill Lipinski	D	IL-03	January 3, 1983	9th term	
81	Alan Mollohan	D	WV-01	January 3, 1983	9th term	
82	Solomon P. Ortiz	D	TX-27	January 3, 1983	9th term	
83	Major Owens	D	NY-11	January 3, 1983	9th term	
84	Ron Packard	R	CA-48	January 3, 1983	9th term	Left the House in 2001.
85	Norman Sisisky	D	VA-04	January 3, 1983	9th term	
86	John Spratt	D	SC-05	January 3, 1983	9th term	
87	Edolphus Towns	D	NY-10	January 3, 1983	9th term	
88	Bob Wise	D	WV-02	January 3, 1983	9th term	Left the House in 2001.
89	Gary Ackerman	D	NY-05	March 1, 1983	9th term	
90	Jerry Kleczka	D	WI-04	April 3, 1984	9th term	
91	Jim Saxton	R	NJ-03	November 6, 1984	9th term	
92	Dick Armey	R	TX-26	January 3, 1985	8th term	
93	Joe Barton	R	TX-06	January 3, 1985	8th term	
94	Sonny Callahan	R	AL-01	January 3, 1985	8th term	
95	Howard Coble	R	NC-06	January 3, 1985	8th term	
96	Larry Combest	R	TX-19	January 3, 1985	8th term	
97	Tom DeLay	R	TX-22	January 3, 1985	8th term	
98	Bart Gordon	D	TN-06	January 3, 1985	8th term	
99	Paul Kanjorski	D	PA-11	January 3, 1985	8th term	
100	Jim Kolbe	R	AZ-05	January 3, 1985	8th term	
101	James Traficant	D	OH-17	January 3, 1985	8th term	
102	Pete Visclosky	D	IN-01	January 3, 1985	8th term	
103	Cass Ballenger	R	NC-10	November 4, 1986	8th term	
104	Richard Baker	R	LA-06	January 3, 1987	7th term	
105	Ben Cardin	D	MD-03	January 3, 1987	7th term	
106	Peter DeFazio	D	OR-04	January 3, 1987	7th term	
107	Elton Gallegly	R	CA-23	January 3, 1987	7th term	
108	Dennis Hastert	R	IL-14	January 3, 1987	7th term	Speaker of the House
109	Joel Hefley	R	CO-05	January 3, 1987	7th term	
110	Wally Herger	R	CA-02	January 3, 1987	7th term	
111	Amo Houghton	R	NY-31	January 3, 1987	7th term	
112	John Lewis	D	GA-05	January 3, 1987	7th term	
113	Connie Morella	R	MD-08	January 3, 1987	7th term	
114	Owen B. Pickett	D	VA-02	January 3, 1987	7th term	Left the House in 2001.
115	Thomas C. Sawyer	D	OH-14	January 3, 1987	7th term	
116	Louise Slaughter	D	NY-28	January 3, 1987	7th term	
117	Lamar Smith	R	TX-21	January 3, 1987	7th term	
118	Fred Upton	R	MI-06	January 3, 1987	7th term	
119	Curt Weldon	R	PA-07	January 3, 1987	7th term	
120	Nancy Pelosi	D	CA-08	June 2, 1987	7th term	
121	Chris Shays	R	CT-04	August 18, 1987	7th term	
122	Bob Clement	D	TN-05	January 19, 1988	7th term	
123	Jim McCrery	R	LA-04	April 16, 1988	7th term	
124	Jerry Costello	D	IL-12	August 9, 1988	7th term	
125	Jimmy Duncan	R	TN-02	November 8, 1988	7th term	
126	Frank Pallone	D	NJ-06	November 8, 1988	7th term	
127	Christopher Cox	R	CA-47	January 3, 1989	6th term	
128	Eliot Engel	D	NY-17	January 3, 1989	6th term	
129	Paul Gillmor	R	OH-05	January 3, 1989	6th term	
130	Porter Goss	R	FL-14	January 3, 1989	6th term	
131	Nita Lowey	D	NY-18	January 3, 1989	6th term	
132	Jim McDermott	D	WA-07	January 3, 1989	6th term	
133	Michael R. McNulty	D	NY-21	January 3, 1989	6th term	
134	Richard Neal	D	MA-02	January 3, 1989	6th term	
135	Donald M. Payne	D	NJ-10	January 3, 1989	6th term	
136	Dana Rohrabacher	R	CA-45	January 3, 1989	6th term	
137	Cliff Stearns	R	FL-06	January 3, 1989	6th term	
138	John S. Tanner	D	TN-08	January 3, 1989	6th term	
139	James T. Walsh	R	NY-25	January 3, 1989	6th term	
140	Ileana Ros-Lehtinen	R	FL-18	August 29, 1989	6th term	
141	Gary Condit	D	CA-18	September 12, 1989	6th term	
142	Gene Taylor	D	MS-05	October 17, 1989	6th term	
143	José E. Serrano	D	NY-16	March 20, 1990	6th term	
144	Patsy Mink	D	HI-02	September 22, 1990; Previous service, 1965–1977.	12th term*	
145	Rob Andrews	D	NJ-01	November 6, 1990	6th term	
146	Neil Abercrombie	D	HI-01	January 3, 1991; Previous service, 1986–1987.	6th term*	
147	Bill Barrett	R	NE-03	January 3, 1991	5th term	Left the House in 2001.
148	John Boehner	R	OH-08	January 3, 1991	5th term	
149	Dave Camp	R	MI-04	January 3, 1991	5th term	
150	Bud Cramer	D	AL-05	January 3, 1991	5th term	
151	Duke Cunningham	R	CA-50	January 3, 1991	5th term	
152	Rosa DeLauro	D	CT-03	January 3, 1991	5th term	
153	John Doolittle	R	CA-04	January 3, 1991	5th term	
154	Cal Dooley	D	CA-20	January 3, 1991	5th term	
155	Chet Edwards	D	TX-11	January 3, 1991	5th term	
156	Wayne Gilchrest	R	MD-01	January 3, 1991	5th term	
157	Dave Hobson	R	OH-07	January 3, 1991	5th term	
158	William J. Jefferson	D	LA-02	January 3, 1991	5th term	
159	Jim Moran	D	VA-08	January 3, 1991	5th term	
160	Jim Nussle	R	IA-02	January 3, 1991	5th term	
161	Collin Peterson	D	MN-07	January 3, 1991	5th term	
162	Jim Ramstad	R	MN-03	January 3, 1991	5th term	
163	Tim Roemer	D	IN-03	January 3, 1991	5th term	
164	Bernie Sanders	I	VT-AL	January 3, 1991	5th term	
165	Charles H. Taylor	R	NC-11	January 3, 1991	5th term	
166	Maxine Waters	D	CA-35	January 3, 1991	5th term	
167	Sam Johnson	R	TX-03	May 8, 1991	5th term	
168	John Olver	D	MA-01	June 4, 1991	5th term	
169	Thomas W. Ewing	R	IL-15	July 2, 1991	5th term	Left the House in 2001.
170	Ed Pastor	D	AZ-02	October 3, 1991	5th term	
171	Eva Clayton	D	NC-01	November 3, 1992	5th term	
172	Jerry Nadler	D	NY-08	November 3, 1992	5th term	
173	Spencer Bachus	R	AL-06	January 3, 1993	4th term	
174	James A. Barcia	D	MI-05	January 3, 1993	4th term	
175	Tom Barrett	D	WI-05	January 3, 1993	4th term	
176	Roscoe Bartlett	R	MD-06	January 3, 1993	4th term	
177	Xavier Becerra	D	CA-30	January 3, 1993	4th term	
178	Sanford Bishop	D	GA-02	January 3, 1993	4th term	
179	Henry Bonilla	R	TX-23	January 3, 1993	4th term	
180	Corrine Brown	D	FL-03	January 3, 1993	4th term	
181	Sherrod Brown	D	OH-13	January 3, 1993	4th term	
182	Steve Buyer	R	IN-05	January 3, 1993	4th term	
183	Charles T. Canady	R	FL-12	January 3, 1993	4th term	Left the House in 2001.
184	Ken Calvert	R	CA-43	January 3, 1993	4th term	
185	Mike Castle	R	DE-AL	January 3, 1993	4th term	
186	Jim Clyburn	D	SC-06	January 3, 1993	4th term	
187	Mac Collins	R	GA-03	January 3, 1993	4th term	
188	Pat Danner	D	MO-06	January 3, 1993	4th term	Left the House in 2001.
189	Nathan Deal	R	GA-09	January 3, 1993	4th term	
190	Peter Deutsch	D	FL-20	January 3, 1993	4th term	
191	Lincoln Díaz-Balart	R	FL-21	January 3, 1993	4th term	
192	Jay Dickey	R	AR-04	January 3, 1993	4th term	Left the House in 2001.
193	Jennifer Dunn	R	WA-08	January 3, 1993	4th term	
194	Anna Eshoo	D	CA-14	January 3, 1993	4th term	
195	Terry Everett	R	AL-02	January 3, 1993	4th term	
196	Bob Filner	D	CA-51	January 3, 1993	4th term	
197	Tillie Fowler	R	FL-04	January 3, 1993	4th term	Left the House in 2001.
198	Bob Franks	R	NJ-07	January 3, 1993	4th term	Left the House in 2001.
199	Bob Goodlatte	R	VA-06	January 3, 1993	4th term	
200	Gene Green	D	TX-29	January 3, 1993	4th term	
201	James C. Greenwood	R	PA-08	January 3, 1993	4th term	
202	Luis Gutiérrez	D	IL-04	January 3, 1993	4th term	
203	Alcee Hastings	D	FL-23	January 3, 1993	4th term	
204	Earl Hilliard	D	AL-07	January 3, 1993	4th term	
205	Maurice Hinchey	D	NY-26	January 3, 1993	4th term	
206	Pete Hoekstra	R	MI-02	January 3, 1993	4th term	
207	Tim Holden	D	PA-06	January 3, 1993	4th term	
208	Steve Horn	R	CA-38	January 3, 1993	4th term	
209	Ernest Istook	R	OK-05	January 3, 1993	4th term	
210	Eddie Bernice Johnson	D	TX-30	January 3, 1993	4th term	
211	Peter T. King	R	NY-03	January 3, 1993	4th term	
212	Jack Kingston	R	GA-01	January 3, 1993	4th term	
213	Ron Klink	D	PA-04	January 3, 1993	4th term	Left the House in 2001.
214	Joe Knollenberg	R	MI-11	January 3, 1993	4th term	
215	Rick Lazio	R	NY-02	January 3, 1993	4th term	Left the House in 2001.
216	John Linder	R	GA-11	January 3, 1993	4th term	
217	Carolyn Maloney	D	NY-14	January 3, 1993	4th term	
218	Don Manzullo	R	IL-16	January 3, 1993	4th term	
219	John M. McHugh	R	NY-24	January 3, 1993	4th term	
220	Scott McInnis	R	CO-03	January 3, 1993	4th term	
221	Buck McKeon	R	CA-25	January 3, 1993	4th term	
222	Cynthia McKinney	D	GA-04	January 3, 1993	4th term	
223	Marty Meehan	D	MA-05	January 3, 1993	4th term	
224	Carrie Meek	D	FL-17	January 3, 1993	4th term	
225	Bob Menendez	D	NJ-13	January 3, 1993	4th term	
226	John Mica	R	FL-07	January 3, 1993	4th term	
227	Dan Miller	R	FL-13	January 3, 1993	4th term	
228	David Minge	D	MN-02	January 3, 1993	4th term	Left the House in 2001.
229	Richard Pombo	R	CA-11	January 3, 1993	4th term	
230	Earl Pomeroy	D	ND-AL	January 3, 1993	4th term	
231	Deborah Pryce	R	OH-15	January 3, 1993	4th term	
232	Jack Quinn	R	NY-30	January 3, 1993	4th term	
233	Lucille Roybal-Allard	D	CA-33	January 3, 1993	4th term	
234	Ed Royce	R	CA-39	January 3, 1993	4th term	
235	Bobby Rush	D	IL-01	January 3, 1993	4th term	
236	Bobby Scott	D	VA-03	January 3, 1993	4th term	
237	Nick Smith	R	MI-07	January 3, 1993	4th term	
238	Bart Stupak	D	MI-01	January 3, 1993	4th term	
239	Jim Talent	R	MO-02	January 3, 1993	4th term	Left the House in 2001.
240	Karen Thurman	D	FL-05	January 3, 1993	4th term	
241	Nydia Velázquez	D	NY-12	January 3, 1993	4th term	
242	Mel Watt	D	NC-12	January 3, 1993	4th term	
243	Lynn Woolsey	D	CA-06	January 3, 1993	4th term	
244	Albert Wynn	D	MD-04	January 3, 1993	4th term	
245	Bennie Thompson	D	MS-02	April 13, 1993	4th term	
246	Rob Portman	R	OH-02	May 4, 1993	4th term	
247	Sam Farr	D	CA-17	June 8, 1993	4th term	
248	Vern Ehlers	R	MI-03	December 7, 1993	4th term	
249	Frank Lucas	R	OK-06	May 10, 1994	4th term	
250	Ron Lewis	R	KY-02	May 24, 1994	4th term	
251	Steve Largent	R	OK-01	November 29, 1994	4th term	
252	John Baldacci	D	ME-02	January 3, 1995	3rd term	
253	Charles Bass	R	NH-02	January 3, 1995	3rd term	
254	Bob Barr	R	GA-07	January 3, 1995	3rd term	
255	Ken Bentsen Jr.	D	TX-25	January 3, 1995	3rd term	
256	Brian Bilbray	R	CA-49	January 3, 1995	3rd term	Left the House in 2001.
257	Ed Bryant	R	TN-07	January 3, 1995	3rd term	
258	Richard Burr	R	NC-05	January 3, 1995	3rd term	
259	Steve Chabot	R	OH-01	January 3, 1995	3rd term	
260	Saxby Chambliss	R	GA-08	January 3, 1995	3rd term	
261	Helen Chenoweth	R	ID-01	January 3, 1995	3rd term	Left the House in 2001.
262	Tom Coburn	R	OK-02	January 3, 1995	3rd term	Left the House in 2001.
263	Barbara Cubin	R	WY-AL	January 3, 1995	3rd term	
264	Tom Davis	R	VA-11	January 3, 1995	3rd term	
265	Lloyd Doggett	D	TX-10	January 3, 1995	3rd term	
266	Mike Doyle	D	PA-18	January 3, 1995	3rd term	
267	Bob Ehrlich	R	MD-02	January 3, 1995	3rd term	
268	Phil English	R	PA-21	January 3, 1995	3rd term	
269	Chaka Fattah	D	PA-02	January 3, 1995	3rd term	
270	Mark Foley	R	FL-16	January 3, 1995	3rd term	
271	Michael Forbes	R	NY-01	January 3, 1995	3rd term	Switched to Democrat on July 17, 1999. Left the House in 2001.
272	Rodney Frelinghuysen	R	NJ-11	January 3, 1995	3rd term	
273	Greg Ganske	R	IA-04	January 3, 1995	3rd term	
274	Lindsey Graham	R	SC-03	January 3, 1995	3rd term	
275	Gil Gutknecht	R	MN-01	January 3, 1995	3rd term	
276	Doc Hastings	R	WA-04	January 3, 1995	3rd term	
277	J. D. Hayworth	R	AZ-06	January 3, 1995	3rd term	
278	Van Hilleary	R	TN-04	January 3, 1995	3rd term	
279	John Hostettler	R	IN-08	January 3, 1995	3rd term	
280	Sheila Jackson Lee	D	TX-18	January 3, 1995	3rd term	
281	Walter B. Jones Jr.	R	NC-03	January 3, 1995	3rd term	
282	Sue W. Kelly	R	NY-19	January 3, 1995	3rd term	
283	Patrick J. Kennedy	D	RI-01	January 3, 1995	3rd term	
284	Ray LaHood	R	IL-18	January 3, 1995	3rd term	
285	Tom Latham	R	IA-05	January 3, 1995	3rd term	
286	Steve LaTourette	R	OH-19	January 3, 1995	3rd term	
287	Frank LoBiondo	R	NJ-02	January 3, 1995	3rd term	
288	Zoe Lofgren	D	CA-16	January 3, 1995	3rd term	
289	Bill Luther	D	MN-06	January 3, 1995	3rd term	
290	Frank Mascara	D	PA-20	January 3, 1995	3rd term	
291	Karen McCarthy	D	MO-05	January 3, 1995	3rd term	
292	David M. McIntosh	R	IN-02	January 3, 1995	3rd term	Left the House in 2001.
293	Jack Metcalf	R	WA-02	January 3, 1995	3rd term	Left the House in 2001.
294	Sue Myrick	R	NC-09	January 3, 1995	3rd term	
295	George Nethercutt	R	WA-05	January 3, 1995	3rd term	
296	Bob Ney	R	OH-18	January 3, 1995	3rd term	
297	Charlie Norwood	R	GA-10	January 3, 1995	3rd term	
298	George Radanovich	R	CA-19	January 3, 1995	3rd term	
299	Lynn N. Rivers	D	MI-13	January 3, 1995	3rd term	
300	Matt Salmon	R	AZ-01	January 3, 1995	3rd term	Left the House in 2001.
301	Mark Sanford	R	SC-01	January 3, 1995	3rd term	Left the House in 2001.
302	Joe Scarborough	R	FL-01	January 3, 1995	3rd term	
303	John Shadegg	R	AZ-04	January 3, 1995	3rd term	
304	Mark Souder	R	IN-04	January 3, 1995	3rd term	
305	Mac Thornberry	R	TX-13	January 3, 1995	3rd term	
306	Todd Tiahrt	R	KS-04	January 3, 1995	3rd term	
307	Zach Wamp	R	TN-03	January 3, 1995	3rd term	
308	J. C. Watts	R	OK-04	January 3, 1995	3rd term	
309	Dave Weldon	R	FL-15	January 3, 1995	3rd term	
310	Jerry Weller	R	IL-11	January 3, 1995	3rd term	
311	Ed Whitfield	R	KY-01	January 3, 1995	3rd term	
312	Roger Wicker	R	MS-01	January 3, 1995	3rd term	
313	Tom Campbell	R	CA-15	December 12, 1995; Previous service, 1989–1993.	5th term*	Left the House in 2001.
314	Jesse Jackson Jr.	D	IL-02	December 12, 1995	3rd term	
315	Juanita Millender-McDonald	D	CA-37	March 26, 1996	3rd term	
316	Elijah Cummings	D	MD-07	April 16, 1996	3rd term	
317	Earl Blumenauer	D	OR-03	May 21, 1996	3rd term	
318	Jo Ann Emerson	R	MO-08	November 5, 1996	3rd term	
319	Jim Ryun	R	KS-02	November 27, 1996	3rd term	
320	Robert Aderholt	R	AL-04	January 3, 1997	2nd term	
321	Tom Allen	D	ME-01	January 3, 1997	2nd term	
322	Rod Blagojevich	D	IL-05	January 3, 1997	2nd term	
323	Marion Berry	D	AR-01	January 3, 1997	2nd term	
324	Roy Blunt	R	MO-07	January 3, 1997	2nd term	
325	Leonard Boswell	D	IA-03	January 3, 1997	2nd term	
326	Allen Boyd	D	FL-02	January 3, 1997	2nd term	
327	Kevin Brady	R	TX-08	January 3, 1997	2nd term	
328	Chris Cannon	R	UT-03	January 3, 1997	2nd term	
329	Julia Carson	D	IN-10	January 3, 1997	2nd term	
330	Merrill Cook	R	UT-02	January 3, 1997	2nd term	Left the House in 2001.
331	John Cooksey	R	LA-05	January 3, 1997	2nd term	
332	Danny K. Davis	D	IL-07	January 3, 1997	2nd term	
333	Jim Davis	D	FL-11	January 3, 1997	2nd term	
334	Diana DeGette	D	CO-01	January 3, 1997	2nd term	
335	Bill Delahunt	D	MA-10	January 3, 1997	2nd term	
336	Bob Etheridge	D	NC-02	January 3, 1997	2nd term	
337	Harold Ford Jr.	D	TN-09	January 3, 1997	2nd term	
338	Jim Gibbons	R	NV-02	January 3, 1997	2nd term	
339	Virgil Goode	D	VA-05	January 3, 1997	2nd term	Switched to Independent on January 27, 2000.
340	Kay Granger	R	TX-12	January 3, 1997	2nd term	
341	Rick Hill	R	MT-AL	January 3, 1997	2nd term	Left the House in 2001.
342	Rubén Hinojosa	D	TX-15	January 3, 1997	2nd term	
343	Darlene Hooley	D	OR-05	January 3, 1997	2nd term	
344	Kenny Hulshof	R	MO-09	January 3, 1997	2nd term	
345	Asa Hutchinson	R	AR-03	January 3, 1997	2nd term	
346	Bill Jenkins	R	TN-01	January 3, 1997	2nd term	
347	Chris John	D	LA-07	January 3, 1997	2nd term	
348	Carolyn Cheeks Kilpatrick	D	MI-15	January 3, 1997	2nd term	
349	Ron Kind	D	WI-03	January 3, 1997	2nd term	
350	Dennis Kucinich	D	OH-10	January 3, 1997	2nd term	
351	Nick Lampson	D	TX-09	January 3, 1997	2nd term	
352	James H. Maloney	D	CT-05	January 3, 1997	2nd term	
353	Carolyn McCarthy	D	NY-04	January 3, 1997	2nd term	
354	Jim McGovern	D	MA-03	January 3, 1997	2nd term	
355	Mike McIntyre	D	NC-07	January 3, 1997	2nd term	
356	Jerry Moran	R	KS-01	January 3, 1997	2nd term	
357	Anne Northup	R	KY-03	January 3, 1997	2nd term	
358	Bill Pascrell	D	NJ-08	January 3, 1997	2nd term	
359	Ron Paul	R	TX-14	January 3, 1997; Previous service, 1976–1977 and 1979–1985.	6th term**	
360	Edward A. Pease	R	IN-07	January 3, 1997	2nd term	Left the House in 2001.
361	John E. Peterson	R	PA-05	January 3, 1997	2nd term	
362	Chip Pickering	R	MS-03	January 3, 1997	2nd term	
363	Joe Pitts	R	PA-16	January 3, 1997	2nd term	
364	David Price	D	NC-04	January 3, 1997; Previous service, 1987–1995.	6th term*	
365	Silvestre Reyes	D	TX-16	January 3, 1997	2nd term	
366	Bob Riley	R	AL-03	January 3, 1997	2nd term	
367	James E. Rogan	R	CA-27	January 3, 1997	2nd term	Left the House in 2001.
368	Steve Rothman	D	NJ-09	January 3, 1997	2nd term	
369	Loretta Sanchez	D	CA-46	January 3, 1997	2nd term	
370	Max Sandlin	D	TX-01	January 3, 1997	2nd term	
371	Bob Schaffer	R	CO-04	January 3, 1997	2nd term	
372	Pete Sessions	R	TX-05	January 3, 1997	2nd term	
373	Brad Sherman	D	CA-24	January 3, 1997	2nd term	
374	John Shimkus	R	IL-20	January 3, 1997	2nd term	
375	Adam Smith	D	WA-09	January 3, 1997	2nd term	
376	Vic Snyder	D	AR-02	January 3, 1997	2nd term	
377	Debbie Stabenow	D	MI-08	January 3, 1997	2nd term	Left the House in 2001.
378	Ted Strickland	D	OH-06	January 3, 1997; Previous service, 1993–1995.	3rd term*	
379	John E. Sununu	R	NH-01	January 3, 1997	2nd term	
380	Ellen Tauscher	D	CA-10	January 3, 1997	2nd term	
381	John Thune	R	SD-AL	January 3, 1997	2nd term	
382	John F. Tierney	D	MA-06	January 3, 1997	2nd term	
383	Jim Turner	D	TX-02	January 3, 1997	2nd term	
384	Wes Watkins	R	OK-03	January 3, 1997; Previous service, 1977–1991.	9th term*	
385	Robert Weygand	D	RI-02	January 3, 1997	2nd term	Left the House in 2001.
386	Robert Wexler	D	FL-19	January 3, 1997	2nd term	
387	Ciro Rodriguez	D	TX-28	April 12, 1997	2nd term	
388	Vito Fossella	R	NY-13	November 4, 1997	2nd term	
389	Gregory Meeks	D	NY-06	February 3, 1998	2nd term	
390	Lois Capps	D	CA-22	March 10, 1998	2nd term	
391	Mary Bono	R	CA-44	April 7, 1998	2nd term	
392	Barbara Lee	D	CA-09	April 7, 1998	2nd term	
393	Bob Brady	D	PA-01	May 19, 1998	2nd term	
394	Heather Wilson	R	NM-01	June 23, 1998	2nd term	
395	Brian Baird	D	WA-03	January 3, 1999	1st term	
396	Tammy Baldwin	D	WI-02	January 3, 1999	1st term	
397	Shelley Berkley	D	NV-01	January 3, 1999	1st term	
398	Judy Biggert	R	IL-13	January 3, 1999	1st term	
399	Mike Capuano	D	MA-08	January 3, 1999	1st term	
400	Joe Crowley	D	NY-07	January 3, 1999	1st term	
401	Jim DeMint	R	SC-04	January 3, 1999	1st term	
402	Ernie Fletcher	R	KY-06	January 3, 1999	1st term	
403	Charlie Gonzalez	D	TX-20	January 3, 1999	1st term	
404	Mark Green	R	WI-08	January 3, 1999	1st term	
405	Robin Hayes	R	NC-08	January 3, 1999	1st term	
406	Baron Hill	D	IN-09	January 3, 1999	1st term	
407	Joe Hoeffel	D	PA-13	January 3, 1999	1st term	
408	Rush Holt Jr.	D	NJ-12	January 3, 1999	1st term	
409	Jay Inslee	D	WA-01	January 3, 1999; Previous service, 1993–1995.	2nd term*	
410	Steven T. Kuykendall	R	CA-36	January 3, 1999	1st term	Left the House in 2001.
411	Stephanie Tubbs Jones	D	OH-11	January 3, 1999	1st term	
412	John B. Larson	D	CT-01	January 3, 1999	1st term	
413	Ken Lucas	D	KY-04	January 3, 1999	1st term	
414	Gary Miller	R	CA-41	January 3, 1999	1st term	
415	Dennis Moore	D	KS-03	January 3, 1999	1st term	
416	Grace Napolitano	D	CA-34	January 3, 1999	1st term	
417	Doug Ose	R	CA-03	January 3, 1999	1st term	
418	David D. Phelps	D	IL-19	January 3, 1999	1st term	
419	Thomas M. Reynolds	R	NY-27	January 3, 1999	1st term	
420	Paul Ryan	R	WI-01	January 3, 1999	1st term	
421	Jan Schakowsky	D	IL-09	January 3, 1999	1st term	
422	Don Sherwood	R	PA-10	January 3, 1999	1st term	
423	Ronnie Shows	D	MS-04	January 3, 1999	1st term	
424	Mike Simpson	R	ID-02	January 3, 1999	1st term	
425	John E. Sweeney	R	NY-22	January 3, 1999	1st term	
426	Tom Tancredo	R	CO-06	January 3, 1999	1st term	
427	Lee Terry	R	NE-02	January 3, 1999	1st term	
428	Mike Thompson	D	CA-01	January 3, 1999	1st term	
429	Pat Toomey	R	PA-15	January 3, 1999	1st term	
430	Mark Udall	D	CO-02	January 3, 1999	1st term	
431	Tom Udall	D	NM-03	January 3, 1999	1st term	
432	Greg Walden	R	OR-02	January 3, 1999	1st term	
433	Anthony Weiner	D	NY-09	January 3, 1999	1st term	
434	David Wu	D	OR-01	January 3, 1999	1st term	
	Johnny Isakson	R	GA-06	February 23, 1999	1st term	
	David Vitter	R	LA-01	May 29, 1999	1st term	
	Joe Baca	D	CA-42	November 16, 1999	1st term	

== Delegates ==
Rank	Delegate	Party	District	Seniority date (Previous service, if any)	No.# of term(s)	Notes
1	Eni Faleomavaega	D	AS	January 3, 1989	6th term	
2	Eleanor Holmes Norton	D	DC	January 3, 1991	5th term	
3	Carlos Romero Barceló	D	PR	January 3, 1993	4th term	
4	Robert A. Underwood	D	GU	January 3, 1993	4th term	
5	Donna Christian-Christensen	D	VI	January 3, 1997	2nd term	

== See also ==
- 106th United States Congress
- List of United States congressional districts
- List of United States senators in the 106th Congress
