= John Olver =

American politician (1936–2023)

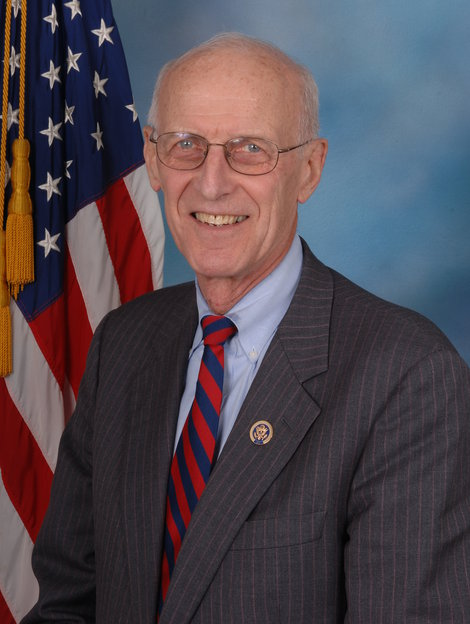
- Olver in the 111th United States Congress

Member of the U.S. House of Representatives from Massachusetts's 1st district
- In office June 4, 1991 – January 3, 2013 (Note: Olver's official service begins on the date of the special election, while he was not sworn in until June 18, 1991.)
- Preceded by: Silvio O. Conte
- Succeeded by: Richard Neal

Member of the Massachusetts Senate from the Franklin and Hampshire district
- In office January 3, 1973 – June 15, 1991
- Preceded by: John Barrus
- Succeeded by: Stan Rosenberg

Member of the Massachusetts House of Representatives from the 2nd Hampshire district
- In office January 1, 1969 – January 3, 1973
- Preceded by: Donald Madsen
- Succeeded by: James Collin

Personal details
- Born: John Walter Olver; September 3, 1936 Honesdale, Pennsylvania, U.S.
- Died: February 23, 2023 (aged 86) Amherst, Massachusetts, U.S.
- Party: Democratic
- Spouse: Rose Richardson (m. 1959; died 2014)
- Children: 1
- Education: Rensselaer Polytechnic Institute (BS); Tufts University (MS); Massachusetts Institute of Technology (PhD)
- Olver's voice Olver speaks on FY2005 funding for transportation, treasury and independent agencies. Recorded September 14, 2004

John Walter Olver (September 3, 1936 – February 23, 2023) was an American politician and chemist who was the U.S. representative for Massachusetts's 1st congressional district from 1991 to 2013. Raised on a farm in Pennsylvania, Olver graduated from college at the age of 18 and went on to earn a PhD in chemistry from the Massachusetts Institute of Technology and later taught chemistry at the University of Massachusetts Amherst for eight years.

He served in both chambers of the Massachusetts General Court, being elected to the Massachusetts House of Representatives in 1968 and the Massachusetts Senate in 1972. He ran in a 1991 special election to succeed 17-term Congressman Silvio O. Conte, who died in office. He was the first Democrat ever to represent the 1st congressional district.

Olver announced he would not seek re-election in 2012 and retired at the end of his eleventh term in Congress. He died at home in 2023 at age 86.

== Early life, education, and career ==
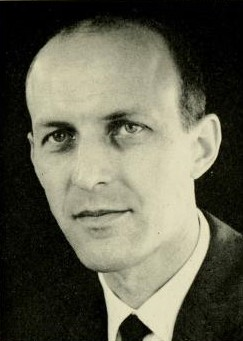
Olver during his tenure in the Massachusetts House of Representatives

Olver was born on September 3, 1936, in Honesdale, Pennsylvania, the son of Helen Marguerite (née Fulleborn) and Thomas Horace Olver. His paternal grandparents were of English descent, and his maternal grandparents were German. Olver grew up on his father's farm, where the two tended cows, while his mother ran a boarding house which served families from Philadelphia and New York City. Olver graduated from high school when he was 15 and enrolled in Rensselaer Polytechnic Institute, where he earned a Bachelor of Science in chemistry at the age of 18. After earning his undergraduate degree, Olver went on to earn a Master of Science in chemistry from Tufts University in 1956 and a Doctor of Philosophy in chemistry from the Massachusetts Institute of Technology in 1961.

Olver taught chemistry at the University of Massachusetts Amherst for eight years and later resigned to pursue a career in politics. He served two terms as a member of the Massachusetts House of Representatives from January 1, 1969, to January 3, 1973. He later served for nine terms in the Massachusetts Senate from January 3, 1973, until his resignation in 1991 to serve in the U.S. House of Representatives.

== U.S. House of Representatives ==
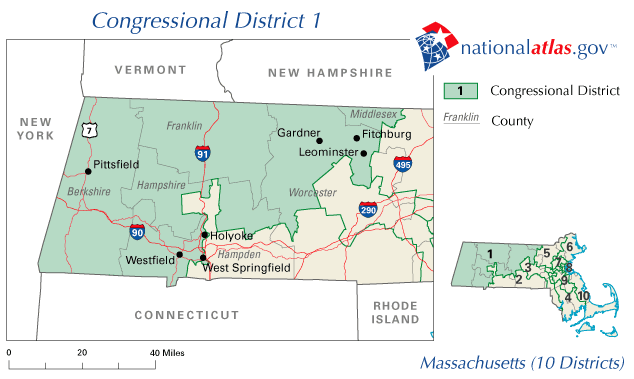
Massachusetts's 1st congressional district, during the second decade of Olver's tenure. The district was a primarily rural district that makes up most of Western Massachusetts.

=== Elections ===
On February 18, 1991, Congressman Silvio O. Conte died one month after taking office for his 17th term. That June, Olver, who had been sworn in for his 10th term in the state Senate a few months earlier, in January 1991, narrowly defeated Republican Steven Pierce in a special election for the seat, becoming the first Democrat to win the seat since it changed from being the 13th district in 1893. Olver resigned from the state Senate on June 15 and was sworn in on June 18.

Olver won the election to a full term in 1992. In 1994, the year in which Republicans took control of the House for the first time in 40 years, Olver ran unopposed. In 1996, he defeated State Senator and future Lieutenant and Acting Governor Jane Swift by a 53% to 47% margin. After 1996, Olver continually won re-election with high margins above 60%.

On October 26, 2011, Olver announced he would not seek re-election in 2012, clearing the way for any potential Democratic primaries due to Massachusetts losing a congressional seat after the 2010 United States census.

=== Tenure ===
Congressional Quarterly's Politics in America described Olver as "a staunch liberal who prefers to yield the spotlight to other similarly ideological members". Olver has consistently high rankings from the progressive lobbying group Americans for Democratic Action, and consistently low rankings from its conservative counterpart the American Conservative Union.

As a superdelegate to the 2008 Democratic National Convention, Olver endorsed future President Barack Obama. In a tribute to an outgoing Olver and Barney Frank, Ed Markey remarked that, unlike other elected officials who embraced superficial positions to curry public favor, the two were "happy to tell you [they] disagree with you" if they believed so.

==== Foreign policy ====
Olver was a staunch opponent of the United States involvement in Iraq and opposed a United States military presence in Iraq since the 2002 authorization for the use of force in Iraq. He advocated for the removal of U.S. troops from Iraq and consistently voted against proposals to increase funding for military operations and increased deployment. Olver stated that he believed that the United States should seek out a political solution in cooperation with the states neighboring Iraq, such as Iran and Syria, rather than pursuing a strategy based primarily on military means to create a stable and democratic Iraq.

Olver was critical of the United States lack of involvement regarding the genocide in Darfur. Olver was one of five members of Congress arrested on April 28, 2006, after protesting the genocide outside the Sudanese Embassy. Olver was arrested again in front of the Sudanese Embassy during a protest in 2012 along with other members of Congress and actor George Clooney.

==== Domestic policy ====
Olver co-sponsored H.R. 676 which would introduce a universal health insurance program with single-payer financing. In addition to supporting different pieces of health care reform legislation in the House, Olver had also strongly supported allowing federal funds related to health care programs to fund abortion operations. In addition to supporting the inclusion of coverage for abortions in health care, Olver had consistently supported pro-choice legislation in the House and has received favorable ratings from pro-choice interest groups such as the NARAL Pro-Choice America, which gave Olver a rating of 100.

Olver supported efforts to reduce the number of illegal immigrants entering the United States but also believed in immigration reform so that qualified immigrants could more easily be granted entrance. Olver also believed that illegal immigrants currently residing in the United States need to be provided with a pathway to citizenship and that these immigrants should not have to return to their countries of origin before obtaining citizenship.

=== Committee assignments ===
- Committee on Appropriations
  - Subcommittee on Energy and Water Development
  - Subcommittee on Homeland Security
  - Subcommittee on Transportation, Housing and Urban Development, and Related Agencies (Chairman)

Party leadership

- Congressional Progressive Caucus
- Senior Whip of the Democratic Caucus

== Personal life ==
Olver was married to Rose Richardson Olver, a Professor of Psychology and Sexuality, Women's and Gender Studies at Amherst College, from 1959 until she died in 2014, and they had one daughter named Martha. He lived in Amherst, Massachusetts, from 1963. He died there at his home on February 23, 2023, at the age of 86.

== Legacy ==
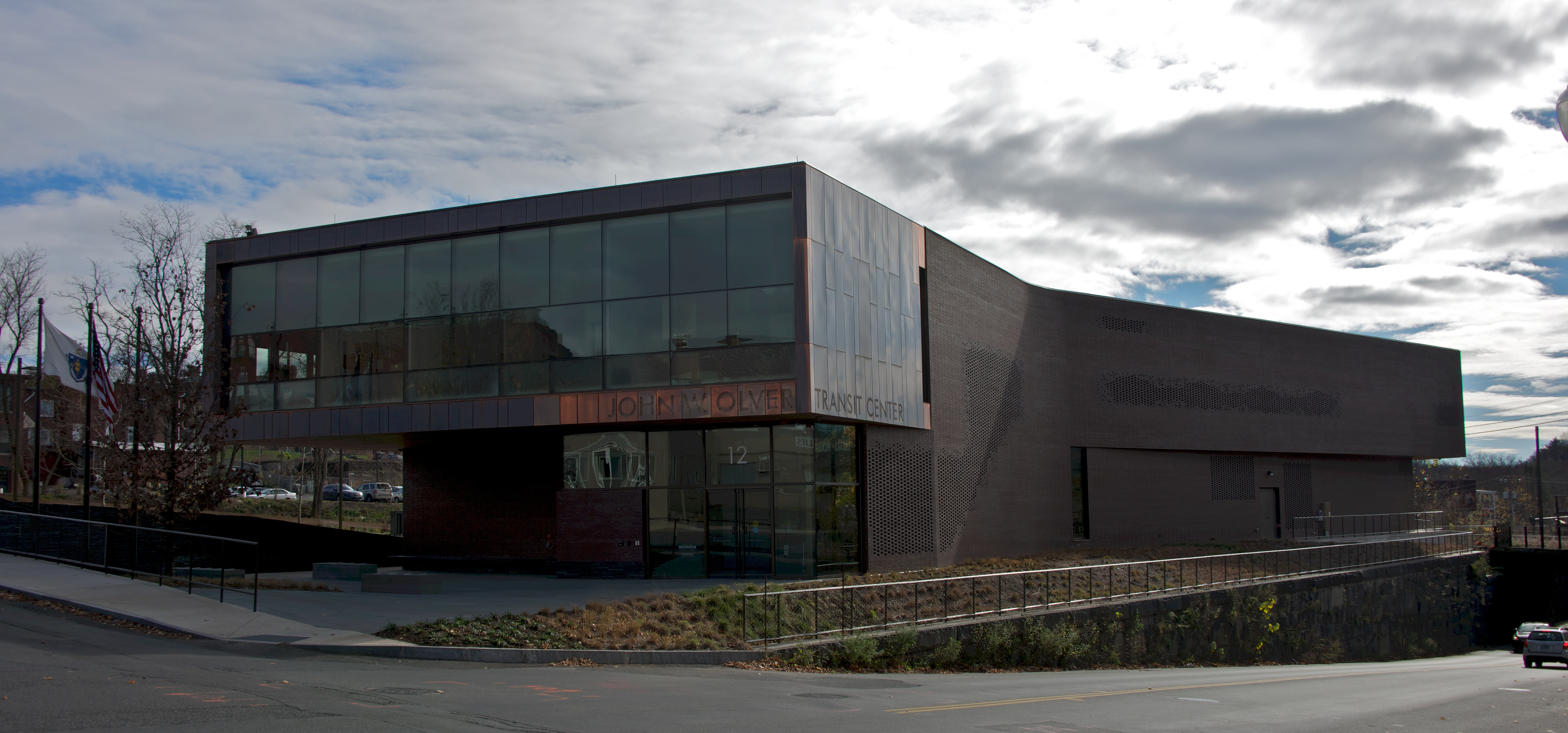
The John W. Olver Transit Center

On October 28, 2010, the veterans' group Soldier On awarded Olver the Soldier On Award. This award, created for Soldier On by sculptor Andrew DeVries, recognizes individuals whose leadership and actions have advanced the goal of ending veteran homelessness.

On May 4, 2012, a new central bus and rail station in Greenfield, Massachusetts, was dedicated in Olver's honor. The building is the first zero-net-energy transportation facility in the nation, generating heat and power via geothermal wells, photovoltaic panels, and sunlight.

On October 27, 2017, the John W. Olver Design Building at the University of Massachusetts Amherst was dedicated in Olver's honor. The building was the largest and most technologically advanced academic wood structure in the US upon completion. It was also the first in the US to use a wood-concrete composite floor system researched at the University of Massachusetts.

U.S. House of Representatives
Preceded by Silvio O. Conte	Member of the U.S. House of Representatives from Massachusetts's 1st congressional district June 4, 1991 – January 3, 2013	Succeeded by Richard Neal
