= United States House Appropriations Subcommittee on Financial Services and General Government =

Subcommittee of the United States House of Representatives

Subcommittee of Committee on Appropriations
- Active United States House of Representatives; 119th Congress

Leadership
- Chair: David Joyce (R)
- Ranking Member: Steny Hoyer (D)

Structure
- Seats: 13 (13 currently filled) 8/8 5/5
- Political parties: Majority (8): Republican (8); Minority (5): Democratic (5)

Meeting place
- 2000, Rayburn House Office Building; Washington, D.C. 20515

Phone number
- (202)-225-7245

U.S. House Appropriations Subcommittee on Financial Service and General Government is a subcommittee of the U.S. House Committee on Appropriations. It was created in 2007 to align the operations of the House and Senate Appropriations Committees. It was assigned jurisdiction over financial and general government programs from the former Subcommittee on Transportation, Treasury, and Housing and Urban Development, The Judiciary, District of Columbia. The United States House Committee on Appropriations has joint jurisdiction with the United States Senate Committee on Appropriations over all appropriations bills in the United States Congress. Each committee has 12 matching subcommittees, each of which is tasked with working on one of the twelve annual regular appropriations bills.

It is Chaired by Republican Steve Womack of Arkansas and its Ranking Member is Steny Hoyer of Maryland.

== Appropriations process ==
Traditionally, after a federal budget for the upcoming fiscal year has been passed, the appropriations subcommittees receive information about what the budget sets as their spending ceilings. This is called "302(b) allocations" after section 302(b) of the Congressional Budget Act of 1974. That amount is separated into smaller amounts for each of the twelve Subcommittees. The federal budget does not become law and is not signed by the President. Instead, it is guide for the House and the Senate in making appropriations and tax decisions. However, no budget is required and each chamber has procedures in place for what to do without one. The House and Senate now consider appropriations bills simultaneously, although originally the House went first. The House Committee on Appropriations usually reports the appropriations bills in May and June and the Senate in June. Any differences between appropriations bills passed by the House and the Senate are resolved in the fall.

== Appropriations bills ==
An appropriations bill is a bill that appropriates (gives to, sets aside for) money to specific federal government departments, agencies, and programs. The money provides funding for operations, personnel, equipment, and activities. Regular appropriations bills are passed annually, with the funding they provide covering one fiscal year. The fiscal year is the accounting period of the federal government, which runs from October 1 to September 30 of the following year.

There are three types of appropriations bills: regular appropriations bills, continuing resolutions, and supplemental appropriations bills. Regular appropriations bills are the twelve standard bills that cover the funding for the federal government for one fiscal year and that are supposed to be enacted into law by October 1. If Congress has not enacted the regular appropriations bills by the time, it can pass a continuing resolution, which continues the pre-existing appropriations at the same levels as the previous fiscal year (or with minor modifications) for a set amount of time. The third type of appropriations bills are supplemental appropriations bills, which add additional funding above and beyond what was originally appropriated at the beginning of the fiscal year. Supplemental appropriations bills can be used for things like disaster relief.

Appropriations bills are one part of a larger United States budget and spending process. They are preceded in that process by the president's budget proposal, congressional budget resolutions, and the 302(b) allocation. Article One of the United States Constitution, section 9, clause 7, states that "No money shall be drawn from the Treasury, but in Consequence of Appropriations made by Law..." This is what gives Congress the power to make these appropriations. The President, however, still has the power to veto appropriations bills.

== Jurisdiction ==
- (1) Department of the Treasury
- (2) District of Columbia
- (3) Federal Judiciary
- (4) Executive Office of the President
- (5) National Security Council
- (6) Office of Management and Budget
- (7) Office of National Drug Control Policy
- (8) Consumer Product Safety Commission
- (9) Election Assistance Commission
- (10) Federal Communications Commission
- (11) Federal Deposit Insurance Corporation
- (12) Federal Election Commission
- (13) Federal Trade Commission
- (14) General Services Administration
- (15) National Archives and Records Administration
- (16) Other independent agencies and general government

== Members, 119th Congress ==
Majority	Minority
David Joyce, Ohio, Chair; Steve Womack, Arkansas; Mark Amodei, Nevada; Ashley Hinson, Iowa; Michael Cloud, Texas; Chuck Edwards, North Carolina; Mark Alford, Missouri; Nick LaLota, New York	Steny Hoyer, Maryland, Ranking Member; Mark Pocan, Wisconsin; Marie Gluesenkamp Perez, Washington; Glenn Ivey, Maryland; Sanford Bishop, Georgia
Ex officio
Tom Cole, Oklahoma	Rosa DeLauro, Connecticut

== Historical membership rosters ==
=== 115th Congress ===
Majority	Minority
Tom Graves, Georgia, Chairman; Kevin Yoder, Kansas; Jaime Herrera Beutler, Washington, Vice Chair; Mark Amodei, Nevada; Chris Stewart, Utah; David Young, Iowa; John Moolenaar, Michigan	Mike Quigley, Illinois, Ranking Member; José E. Serrano, New York; Matt Cartwright, Pennsylvania; Sanford Bishop, Georgia
Ex officio
Rodney Frelinghuysen, New Jersey	Nita Lowey, New York

=== 116th Congress ===
Majority	Minority
Mike Quigley, Illinois, Chair; José E. Serrano, New York, Vice Chair; Matt Cartwright, Pennsylvania; Sanford Bishop, Georgia; Norma Torres, California; Charlie Crist, Florida; Ann Kirkpatrick, Arizona	Tom Graves, Georgia, Ranking Member; Mark Amodei, Nevada; Chris Stewart, Utah; David Joyce, Ohio
Ex officio
Nita Lowey, New York	Kay Granger, Texas

=== 117th Congress ===
Majority	Minority
Mike Quigley, Illinois, Chair; Matt Cartwright, Pennsylvania, Vice Chair; Sanford Bishop, Georgia; Mark Pocan, Wisconsin; Brenda Lawrence, Michigan; Norma Torres, California; Ann Kirkpatrick, Arizona	Steve Womack, Arkansas, Ranking Member; Mark Amodei, Nevada; Chris Stewart, Utah; David Joyce, Ohio
Ex officio
Rosa DeLauro, Connecticut	Kay Granger, Texas

=== 118th Congress ===
Majority	Minority
Steve Womack, Arkansas, Chair; Mark Amodei, Nevada; Chris Stewart, Utah; David Joyce, Ohio; John Moolenaar, Michigan; Ashley Hinson, Iowa; Michael Cloud, Texas; Jerry Carl, Alabama; Juan Ciscomani, Arizona	Steny Hoyer, Maryland, Ranking Member; Matt Cartwright, Pennsylvania; Sanford Bishop, Georgia; Mark Pocan, Wisconsin; Norma Torres, California
Ex officio
Kay Granger, Texas	Rosa DeLauro, Connecticut

== See also ==
- U.S. Senate Appropriations Subcommittee on Financial Services and General Government
