= United States House Appropriations Subcommittee on Commerce, Justice, Science, and Related Agencies =

Subcommittee of Committee on Appropriations
- Active United States House of Representatives; 119th Congress

Leadership
- Chair: Hal Rogers (R)
- Ranking Member: Grace Meng (D)

Structure
- Seats: 13 (13 currently filled) 8/8 5/5
- Political parties: Majority (8): Republican (8); Minority (5): Democratic (5)

Meeting place
- H310, The Capitol; Washington, D.C. 20515

Phone number
- (202)-225-3351

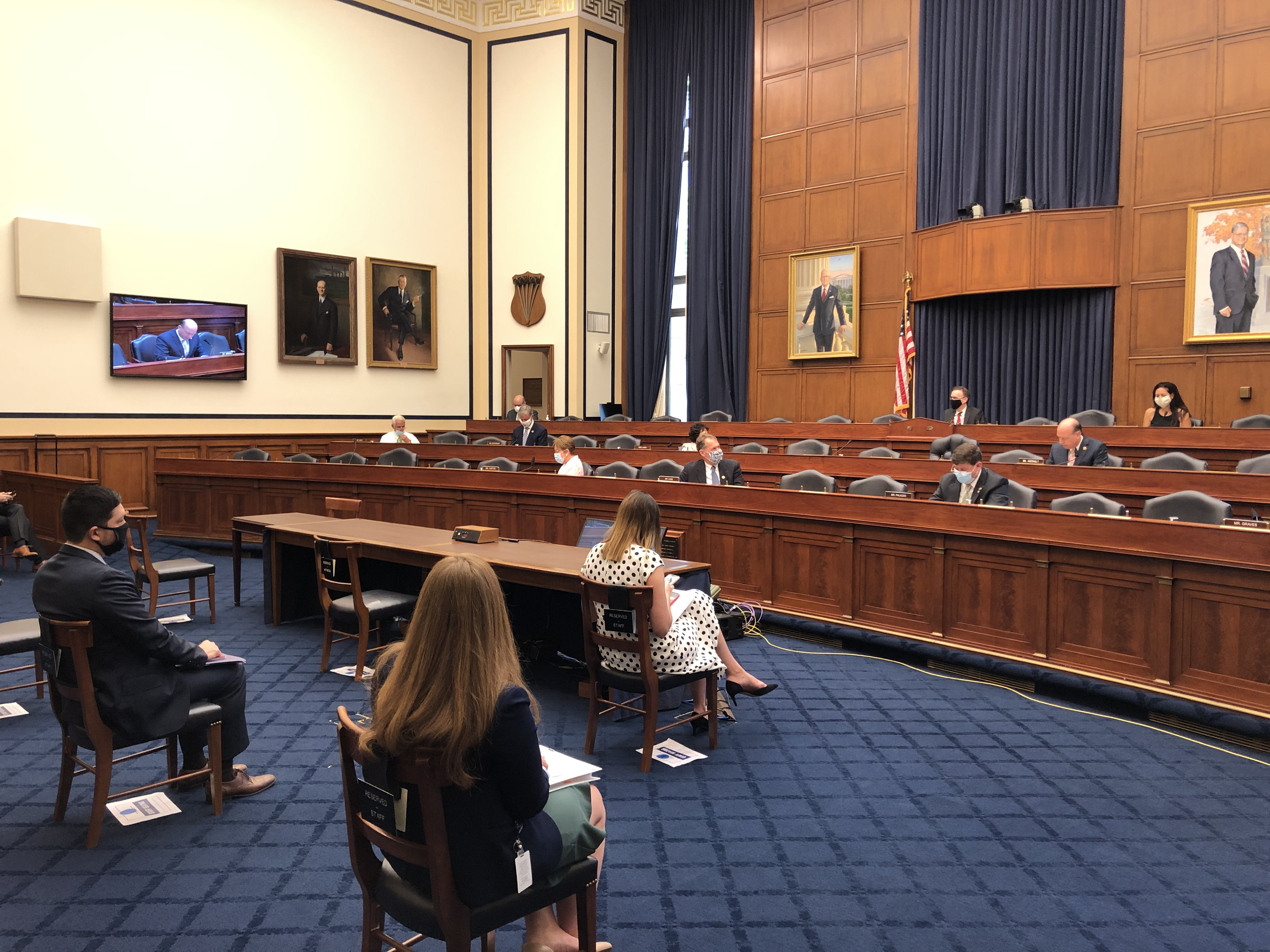
A markup session of the CJS subcommittee in July 2020.

The United States House Appropriations Subcommittee on Commerce, Justice, Science, and Related Agencies is a standing committee of the U.S. House subcommittees and is within the United States House Committee on Appropriations. The United States House Committee on Appropriations has joint jurisdiction with the United States Senate Committee on Appropriations over all appropriations bills in the United States Congress. Each committee has 12 matching subcommittees, each of which is tasked with working on one of the twelve annual regular appropriations bills. This subcommittee has jurisdiction over the budgets for the United States Department of Commerce, the United States Department of Justice, and Science policy of the United States.

The current chair of the subcommittee is Republican Hal Rogers of Kentucky and the Ranking Member is Democrat Grace Meng of New York.

== Appropriations process ==
Traditionally, after a federal budget for the upcoming fiscal year has been passed, the appropriations subcommittees receive information about what the budget sets as their spending ceilings. This is called "302(b) allocations" after section 302(b) of the Congressional Budget Act of 1974. That amount is separated into smaller amounts for each of the twelve Subcommittees. The federal budget does not become law and is not signed by the President. Instead, it is guide for the House and the Senate in making appropriations and tax decisions. However, no budget is required and each chamber has procedures in place for what to do without one. The House and Senate now consider appropriations bills simultaneously, although originally the House went first. The House Committee on Appropriations usually reports the appropriations bills in May and June and the Senate in June. Any differences between appropriations bills passed by the House and the Senate are resolved in the fall.

== Appropriations bills ==
An appropriations bill is a bill that appropriates (gives to, sets aside for) money to specific federal government departments, agencies, and programs. The money provides funding for operations, personnel, equipment, and activities. Regular appropriations bills are passed annually, with the funding they provide covering one fiscal year. The fiscal year is the accounting period of the federal government, which runs from October 1 to September 30 of the following year.

There are three types of appropriations bills: regular appropriations bills, continuing resolutions, and supplemental appropriations bills. Regular appropriations bills are the twelve standard bills that cover the funding for the federal government for one fiscal year and that are supposed to be enacted into law by October 1. If Congress has not enacted the regular appropriations bills by the time, it can pass a continuing resolution, which continues the pre-existing appropriations at the same levels as the previous fiscal year (or with minor modifications) for a set amount of time. The third type of appropriations bills are supplemental appropriations bills, which add additional funding above and beyond what was originally appropriated at the beginning of the fiscal year. Supplemental appropriations bills can be used for things like disaster relief.

Appropriations bills are one part of a larger United States budget and spending process. They are preceded in that process by the president's budget proposal, congressional budget resolutions, and the 302(b) allocation. Article One of the United States Constitution, section 9, clause 7, states that "No money shall be drawn from the Treasury, but in Consequence of Appropriations made by Law..." This is what gives Congress the power to make these appropriations. The President, however, still has the power to veto appropriations bills.

== Jurisdiction ==
The Subcommittee has jurisdiction over the budgets of the Departments of Commerce and Justice and several independent agencies, including the National Aeronautics and Space Administration (NASA) and the National Science Foundation (NSF).

== Members, 119th Congress ==
Majority	Minority
Hal Rogers, Kentucky, Chair; John Carter, Texas; Ben Cline, Virginia; Tony Gonzales, Texas; Andrew Clyde, Georgia; Mark Alford, Missouri; Dale Strong, Alabama, Vice Chair; Riley Moore, West Virginia	Grace Meng, New York, Ranking Member; Glenn Ivey, Maryland; Joe Morelle, New York; Madeleine Dean, Pennsylvania; Frank J. Mrvan, Indiana
Ex officio
Tom Cole, Oklahoma	Rosa DeLauro, Connecticut

== Historical membership ==
=== 115th Congress ===
Majority	Minority
John Culberson, Texas, Chair; Hal Rogers, Kentucky; Robert Aderholt, Alabama, Vice Chair; John Carter, Texas; Martha Roby, Alabama; Steven Palazzo, Mississippi; Evan Jenkins, West Virginia (until September 20, 2018)	José E. Serrano, New York, Ranking Member; Derek Kilmer, Washington; Matt Cartwright, Pennsylvania; Grace Meng, New York
Ex officio
Rodney Frelinghuysen, New Jersey	Nita Lowey, New York

=== 116th Congress ===
Majority	Minority
José E. Serrano, New York, Chair; Matt Cartwright, Pennsylvania, Vice Chair; Grace Meng, New York; Brenda Lawrence, Michigan; Charlie Crist, Florida; Ed Case, Hawaii; Marcy Kaptur, Ohio	Robert Aderholt, Alabama, Ranking Member; Martha Roby, Alabama; Steven Palazzo, Mississippi; Tom Graves, Georgia
Ex officio
Nita Lowey, New York	Kay Granger, Texas

=== 117th Congress ===
Majority	Minority
Matt Cartwright, Pennsylvania, Chair; Grace Meng, New York; Charlie Crist, Florida, Vice Chair; Ed Case, Hawaii; Dutch Ruppersberger, Maryland; Brenda Lawrence, Michigan; David Trone, Maryland	Robert Aderholt, Alabama, Ranking Member; Steven Palazzo, Mississippi; Ben Cline, Virginia; Mike Garcia, California
Ex officio
Rosa DeLauro, Connecticut	Kay Granger, Texas

=== 118th Congress ===
Majority	Minority
Hal Rogers, Kentucky, Chair; Robert Aderholt, Alabama; John Carter, Texas; Ben Cline, Virginia; Mike Garcia, California; Tony Gonzales, Texas; Andrew Clyde, Georgia; Jake Ellzey, Texas	Matt Cartwright, Pennsylvania, Ranking Member; Grace Meng, New York; Dutch Ruppersberger, Maryland; David Trone, Maryland; Joe Morelle, New York
Ex officio
Kay Granger, Texas	Rosa DeLauro, Connecticut
