= Andrew Clyde =

American politician (born 1963)

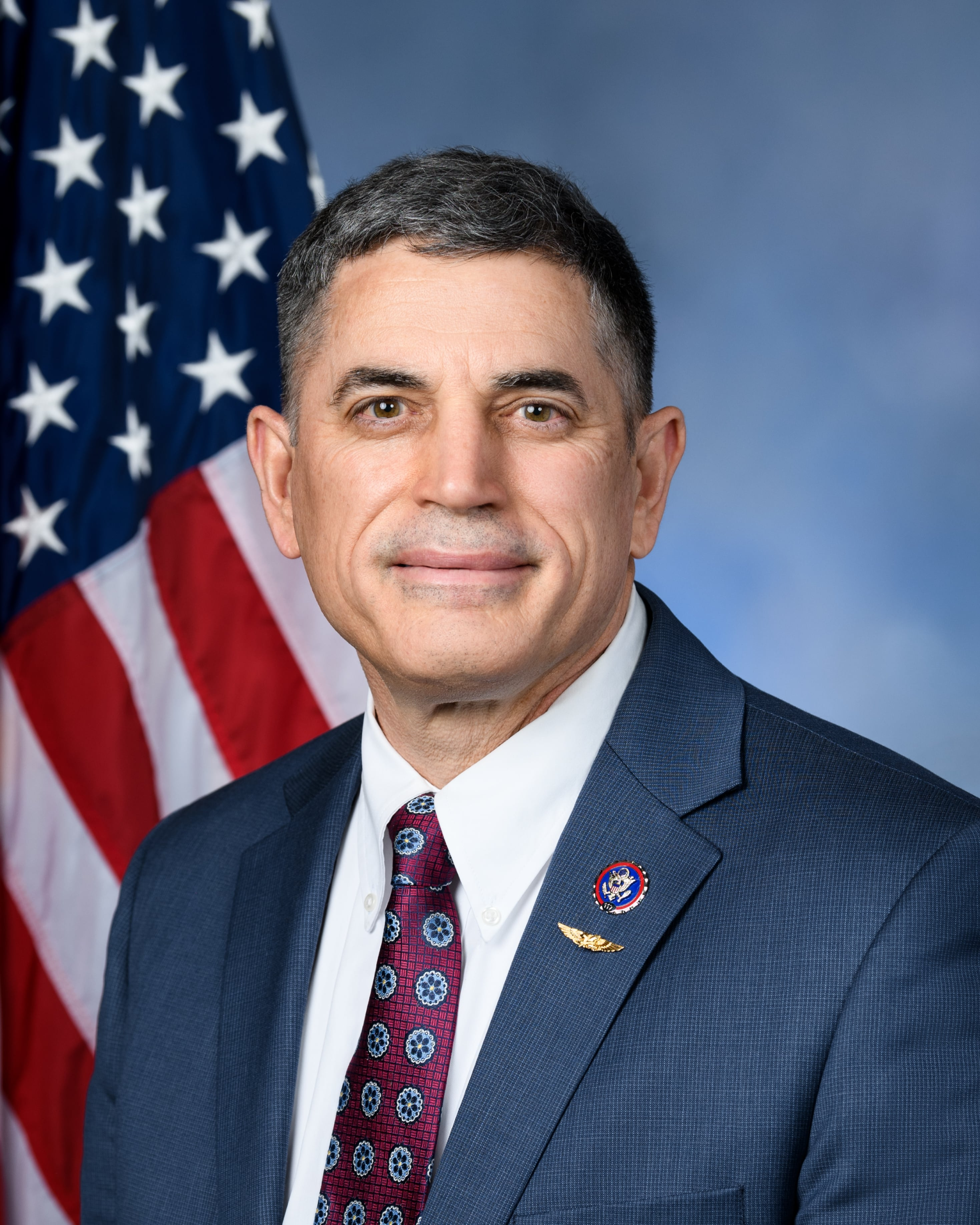
- Official portrait, 2022

Member of the U.S. House of Representatives from Georgia's 9th district
- Incumbent
- Assumed office January 3, 2021
- Preceded by: Doug Collins

Personal details
- Born: Andrew Scott Clyde; November 22, 1963 (age 62) Walkerton, Ontario, Canada
- Party: Republican
- Spouse: Jennifer Morgan
- Education: University of Notre Dame (attended); Bethel University (BBA); University of Georgia (MBA)
- Website: House website Campaign website

Military service
- Allegiance: United States
- Branch/service: United States Navy; Navy Reserve
- Years of service: 1985–1996 (active); 1996–2013 (reserve)
- Rank: Commander
- Clyde's voice Clyde on the origins of the poppy as a symbol of veterans. Recorded November 2, 2021

Andrew Scott Clyde (born November 22, 1963) is an American politician and businessman serving since 2021 as U.S. representative from Georgia's 9th congressional district. A Republican, his district serves a large swath of exurban and rural territory northeast of Atlanta, including Gainesville, Toccoa, Hartwell and Dahlonega.

In 2020, Clyde ran to represent Georgia's 9th congressional district. That same year, he sued Athens, Georgia, over its shelter-in-place COVID-19 restrictions. As a representative, Clyde voted against certifying Arizona's and Pennsylvania's 2020 U.S. presidential election results. He described the 2021 United States Capitol attack as "no insurrection" and said it resembled a "normal tourist visit", although he previously acknowledged that he had helped to barricade the House chamber "from the mob who tried to enter."

== Early life and education ==
Clyde was born on November 22, 1963, in Walkerton, Ontario, Canada. He grew up in Indiana and New York. He attended and graduated cum laude from Bethel University with a BBA in accounting and business management, and was commissioned as an officer in the United States Navy through the University of Notre Dame's NROTC program in 1985. He served 28 years in naval aviation units and the Seabees, including three combat deployments to Iraq and Kuwait.

Clyde received the Defense Meritorious Service Medal, Meritorious Service Medal, a Navy Achievement Medal, and four Navy Commendation Medals. He retired with the rank of commander in 2013. In 1994 he migrated to Athens, Georgia, where he had taught at the Navy Supply Corps School. Clyde earned a Master of Business Administration in corporate finance and entrepreneurship from the University of Georgia Terry College of Business in 1999.

== Career ==
Clyde opened a gun shop, Clyde Armory, Inc., which began as a hobby business in his garage in 1991. He obtained commercial real estate in 1999 and moved in 2010 to a custom-built 12,400-square-foot (1,150 m^{2}) edifice based on the design of a historic armory. In 2014, Clyde opened a second location in Warner Robins, Georgia. He grew the business to $12 million in annual sales and 25 employees. In 2013, he was subject to a civil asset forfeiture of $940,000 by the Internal Revenue Service. The action was later reversed, and he obtained a refund of $900,000.

After the forfeiture, Clyde advocated reform of the procedure in testimony before the United States House Ways and Means Subcommittee on Oversight. In 2019, Congress passed and President Donald Trump signed the Taxpayer First Act (H.R. 3151), which includes the Clyde-Hirsch-Sowers RESPECT Act. The law limits what funds the government can seize.

Clyde was a member of the board of directors of Clarke Community Federal Credit Union.

In 2013 he donated a 5,000-square-foot (460 m^{2}) facility to Mercy Health Center and Athens Crisis Pregnancy Center, a nonprofit anti-abortion organization.

== U.S. House of Representatives ==
=== Elections ===
==== 2020 ====
Clyde announced his candidacy for the United States House of Representatives for Georgia's 9th congressional district after five-term incumbent Doug Collins decided not to seek reelection to run for the United States Senate. During the campaign, he sued the city of Athens, Georgia, over a shelter-in-place order imposed during the COVID-19 pandemic that he said compelled his business to close.

Clyde finished second in the nine-way Republican primary behind State Representative Matt Gurtler in a runoff election. The 9th is one of the most Republican districts in the nation, and it was understood whoever won the runoff would be heavily favored to be the district's next congressman. Clyde won the August 11 runoff.

Clyde defeated Democratic nominee and former U.S. Army warrant officer Devin Pandy in the November general election, and assumed office on January 3, 2021.

=== Tenure ===
On January 6, 2021, during the 2021 United States Electoral College vote count, Clyde was one of 120 Republican representatives who voted against certifying the 2020 presidential election results in both Arizona and Pennsylvania. On March 17, 2021, he also was one of 12 House Republicans to vote against HR 1085 to award three Congressional Gold Medals to the United States police who protected the U.S. Capitol during the 2021 United States Capitol attack. In June 2021, Clyde and 20 other House Republicans voted against a similar resolution.

In May 2021, during a House Oversight Committee hearing, Clyde said that the Capitol attack was "no insurrection" and that there was video of the event that resembled a "normal tourist visit", with Trump supporters behaving "in an orderly fashion, staying between the stanchions and ropes taking videos and pictures". During that same hearing, Clyde acknowledged that during the attack, he "helped barricade the [House chamber] door until almost 3 p.m. from the mob who tried to enter". Fellow lawmakers Adam Kinzinger and Eric Swalwell criticized him for later refusing to shake the hand of a police officer who had been beaten unconscious during the attack.

In June 2021, Clyde was among 14 House Republicans who voted against legislation to establish June 19, or Juneteenth, as a federal holiday. The Atlanta Journal-Constitution reported that Clyde "supported the holiday but didn't like its title, Juneteenth National Independence Day".

On February 28, 2022, Clyde was one of three representatives to vote against the Emmett Till Antilynching Act, which made lynching a federal hate crime.

In April 2022, he led a Republican effort to block the naming of a federal building in Florida after Joseph W. Hatchett, the first black State Supreme Court judge in Florida and south of the Mason–Dixon line. Clyde justified the action, saying that Hatchett had ruled to block prayer at public schools. Naming of federal buildings is usually among the more mundane uncontroversial tasks of Congress, and it is usually accomplished without debate or a recorded vote.

On November 3, 2022, Clyde introduced the Expose Biden's Inflation, Deficits, and Economic Neglect (BIDEN) Act.

In February 2023, Clyde co-sponsored a bill to designate the "AR-15-style rifle" the National Gun of the United States.

Clyde was among the 71 Republicans who voted against final passage of the Fiscal Responsibility Act of 2023 in the House.

Clyde voted to provide Israel with support following 2023 Hamas attack on Israel.

On March 5, 2024, Clyde's Standing Against Houthi Aggression Act was favorably reported by the House Foreign Affairs Committee by a bipartisan vote of 34 - 13.

On June 13, 2024, Clyde introduced H.Amdt. 978 "to relocate the Reconciliation Memorial, also known as the Reconciliation Monument, to its original location in Arlington National Cemetery." It was defeated by roll call, 230–192, with the Aye votes being only Republicans while the No votes included 24 Republicans with the rest being Democrats.

In 2026, Clyde called for a ban on Muslim immigration to the United States, and further called for the denaturalization and deportation of Muslim citizens of the United States.

==== Veterans issues ====
The PACT Act which expanded Veterans Affairs benefits to veterans exposed to toxic chemicals during their military service, received a "nay" from Clyde.

=== Committee assignments ===
For the 119th Congress:

- Committee on Appropriations
  - Subcommittee on Commerce, Justice, Science, and Related Agencies
  - Subcommittee on Labor, Health and Human Services, Education, and Related Agencies
- Committee on the Budget

=== Caucus memberships ===
- Republican Study Committee
- Freedom Caucus
- Congressional Chicken Caucus

== Personal life ==
Clyde and his wife, Jennifer, live in unincorporated Jackson County (with an Athens address). Clyde is a Baptist.

U.S. House of Representatives
Preceded by Doug Collins	Member of the U.S. House of Representatives from Georgia's 9th congressional district 2021–present	Incumbent
U.S. order of precedence (ceremonial)
Preceded by Kat Cammack	United States representatives by seniority 245th	Succeeded by Byron Donalds
