= John Culberson =

American attorney and politician (born 1956)

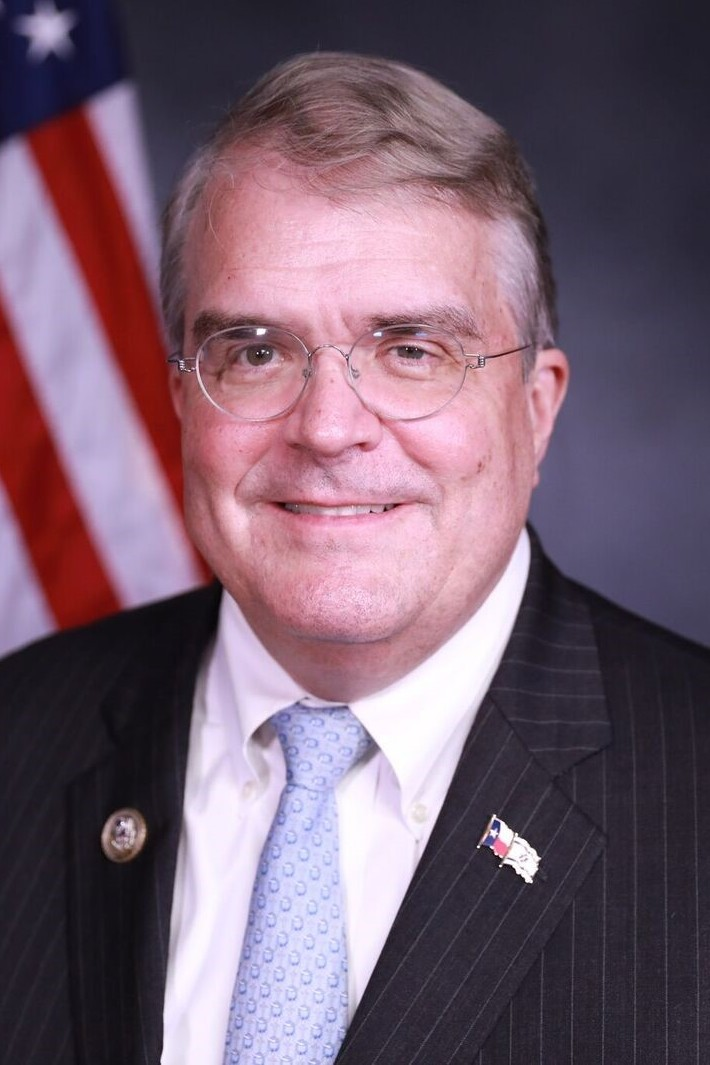

Member of the U.S. House of Representatives from Texas's 7th district
- In office January 3, 2001 – January 3, 2019
- Preceded by: Bill Archer
- Succeeded by: Lizzie Fletcher

Member of the Texas House of Representatives
- In office January 13, 1987 – January 9, 2001
- Preceded by: Milton Fox
- Succeeded by: Bill Callegari
- Constituency: 125th district (1987–1993); 130th district (1993–2001)

Personal details
- Born: John Abney Culberson; August 24, 1956 (age 69) Houston, Texas, U.S.
- Party: Republican
- Education: Southern Methodist University (BA); South Texas College of Law (JD)
- Culberson's voice Culberson honoring retiring Rep. Ralph Hall. Recorded December 9, 2014

John Abney Culberson (born August 24, 1956) is an American attorney and politician who served in the United States House of Representatives from 2001 to 2019. A Republican, he served in Texas's 7th congressional district in large portions of western Houston and surrounding Harris County. In his 2018 re-election campaign, he was defeated by Democrat Lizzie Fletcher. He subsequently began work as a lobbyist.

== Early life, education, and career ==
Culberson was born in Houston, the son of Eleanor (née Abney) and James Vincent Culberson. His great-grandmother was Swedish. Culberson attended Lamar High School. He graduated from Southern Methodist University (SMU) in 1981 with a degree in history. He earned his Juris Doctor degree from South Texas College of Law in 1989.

== Texas House of Representatives ==
During his time in law school, Culberson was elected to the Texas House of Representatives, serving his first term beginning in 1987. He was a member of the Republican Whip team, becoming Minority Whip in 1999 during his last term. Culberson began working for the law firm of Lorance and Thompson as a civil defense attorney after he graduated from law school.

== U.S. House of Representatives ==
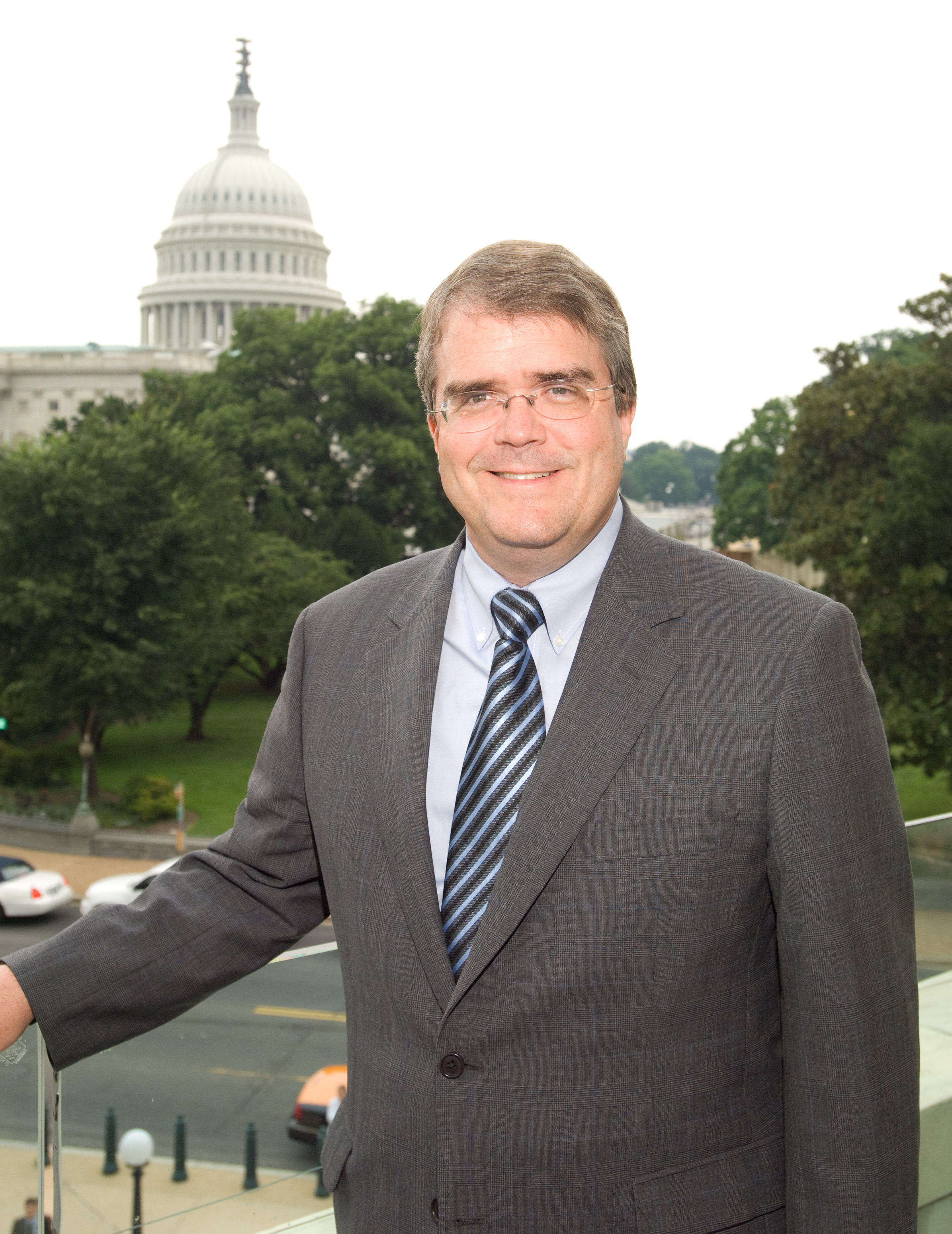
Culberson's freshman portrait during the 107th Congress

=== Elections ===
==== 2000 ====
Culberson won the Republican nomination for the 7th District in 2000 after 15-term incumbent Bill Archer announced his retirement. His state house district included much of the congressional district's western portion. He finished first in the Republican primary — traditionally the real contest in what has historically been a heavily Republican district – and defeated Peter Wareing in the runoff. He won easily in November, taking about 75% of the vote.

==== 2008 ====
In 2008, Culberson defeated businessman Michael Peter Skelly with 56% of the vote. It was only the second time that a Democrat had even crossed 40 percent of the vote in this district.

On August 1, 2008, to protest the House going into summer recess without discussing a pending energy bill, Culberson and other House Republicans stayed to make speeches about the energy bill in question. The Democratic leadership in the House, which controls services in the chamber, responded by cutting the microphones and cameras. Culberson used social media services Twitter and Qik to provide a live account of the proceedings. Culberson later compared this episode to the Iranian government's crackdown against dissidents who used Twitter to protest a restriction on foreign media in June 2009.

==== 2010 ====
Culberson ran unopposed.

==== 2012 ====
Culberson was challenged by the Democratic nominee James Cargas, an energy lawyer for the City of Houston, Green party nominee Lance Findley, and Libertarian Drew Parks.

==== 2014 ====
In the November 4, 2014 general election, Culberson again defeated Democrat James Cargas, who polled 4,092 votes (62.1 percent) in the March 4 primary election. Culberson was unopposed in the Republican primary.

==== 2016 ====
Culberson defeated James Lloyd and Maria Espinoza in the Republican primary election on March 1. Culberson polled 44,202 votes (57.3 percent) to James Lloyd's 19,182 (24.9 percent) and the third candidate, Maria Espinoza's 13,772 (17.8 percent).

He secured his eighth term in the general election held on November 8, when, with 143,542 votes (56.2 percent), he defeated the Democrat James Cargas (born 1966) of Houston, who garnered 111,991 ballots (43.8 percent).

After Hillary Clinton carried Culberson's 7th district in the 2016 presidential election, Democrats began to regard the congressman as vulnerable in 2018.

==== 2018 ====
Culberson defeated Edward Ziegler in the Republican primary with 76% of the vote. Lizzie Pannill Fletcher was the Democratic nominee and defeated him in the general election by a 52.5% to 47.5% margin. Culberson held his own in his longtime base of west Houston and Memorial, much of which he'd represented for over three decades at the state and federal levels. However, Fletcher swamped him in the district's share of southwest Houston that were added in the 2004 redistricting, as well as in the Bear Creek area.

=== Committee assignments ===
- Committee on Appropriations
  - Subcommittee on Commerce, Justice, Science, and Related Agencies (Chair)
  - Subcommittee on Homeland Security
  - Subcommittee on Military Construction, Veterans Affairs, and Related Agencies

=== Caucuses ===
- Congressional Caucus on Turkey and Turkish Americans
- Congressional Constitution Caucus
- Republican Study Committee
- Tea Party Caucus
- Congressional Constitution Caucus

== Political positions ==
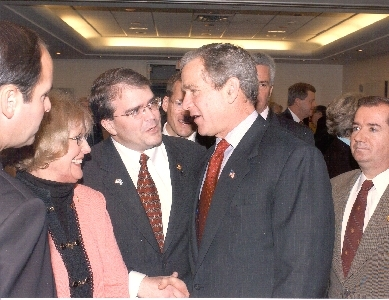
Culberson and President George W. Bush at the United States Capitol in 2005

Culberson had described himself as a "Fiscally conservative 'Jeffersonian Republican'... committed to Thomas Jefferson's vision of limited government, individual liberty, and states' rights."

As of April 2018, he had voted with his party in 97.6% of votes in the 115th Congress and voted in line with President Trump's position in 98.6% of the votes.

=== Abortion ===
Culberson supported pro-life legislation.

=== ACORN ===
Three years after the Association of Community Organizations for Reform Now (ACORN) had been dissolved, Culberson included language in an appropriations bill that said "None of the funds made available in this Act may be distributed to the Association of Community Organizations for Reform Now (ACORN) or its subsidiaries or successors."

=== Budget ===
Culberson generally opposed an income tax increase, opposed reducing defense spending in order to balance the budget, opposed federal spending as a means of promoting economic growth, and supported lowering corporate taxes as a means of promoting economic growth.

=== Disaster relief ===
Culberson was the only Texas Republican to support the $50.7 billion relief effort after Hurricane Sandy. As a member of the U.S. House Appropriations Committee, Culberson has been active in seeking aid in the wake of Hurricane Harvey.

=== Donald Trump ===
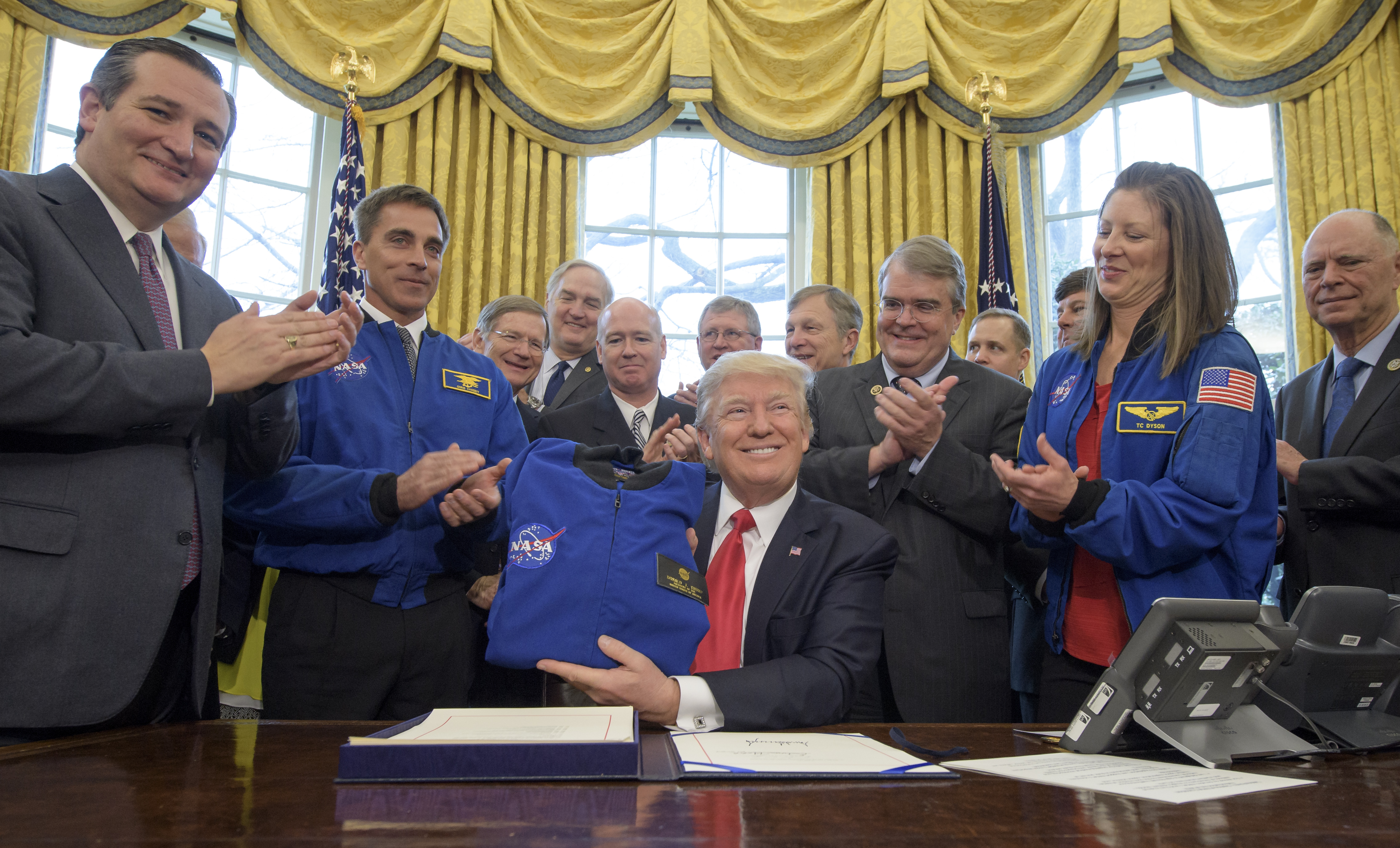
Culberson and President Donald Trump, after signing the NASA Transition Authorization Act of 2017

Culberson was the first person to endorse Ted Cruz in the 2016 U.S. presidential primaries. In June 2016, Culberson said "I always have and always will support the Republican nominee. The party should unify behind the presumptive nominee, Donald Trump, to defeat Hillary Clinton."

In February 2017, he voted against a resolution that would have directed the House to request 10 years of Trump's tax returns, which would then have been reviewed by the House Ways and Means Committee in a closed session. He supports the construction of a wall along the Mexican border, and supports requiring immigrants who are unlawfully present to return to their country of origin before they are eligible for citizenship.

Culberson supported President Donald Trump's 2017 executive order to suspend the refugee resettlement program and curtail immigration from seven Muslim-majority countries. He stated that "This is a necessary pause in the refugee program until our intelligence agencies can develop adequate background checks to ensure that the people coming into the country are coming in for the right reasons."

=== Environment ===
Culberson rejected the scientific consensus on climate change. He has alleged that scientists have falsified climate change data. He has said that "the liberal obsession with climate change... is driven by their desire to raise more money for the government". He opposes cap-and-trade programs and the federal regulation of greenhouse gas emissions. He supports government funding for the development of renewable energy.

Culberson had a lifetime score of 4% from the League of Conservation Voters.

=== Guns ===
In 2016, Culberson wrote a letter to Attorney General Loretta Lynch threatening to block President Obama's executive order on guns by defunding the United States Department of Justice.

=== Healthcare ===
Culberson opposed the Patient Protection and Affordable Care Act (Obamacare) and supported its repeal. On May 4, 2017, Culberson voted to repeal Obamacare and pass the American Health Care Act of 2017. The AHCA would have allowed insurers to charge seniors five times as much for health coverage than younger people (the ACA limit was three times as much) and allowed insurers to raise premiums on individuals with preexisting conditions who did not have continuous coverage.

In 2013, Culberson said "like 9/11, 'let's roll!'" to describe a vote to make a delay of the Patient Protection and Affordable Care Act a condition for funding the government.

=== Immigration ===
In 2003, Culberson claimed that "Al Qaeda terrorists and Chinese nationals are infiltrating our country virtually anywhere they choose from Brownsville to San Diego," and that "a large number of Islamic individuals have moved into homes in Nuevo Laredo and are being taught Spanish to assimilate with the local culture." He would go on to say, "Full scale war is underway on our southern border, and our entire way of life is at risk if we do not win the battle for Laredo."

=== Presidential citizenship ===
In 2009, Culberson co-sponsored legislation to enforce citizenship requirements on presidential candidates by requiring all future presidential candidates to provide proof of their citizenship when filing to run for office. The legislation was in response to Barack Obama citizenship conspiracy theories which questioned the legitimacy of Barack Obama's birth certificate.

=== Science ===
Culberson marked up a 2016 spending bill to include a requirement that the National Science Foundation direct about 70% of its funding to biology, computing, engineering, and math and physical sciences. The earmarked funds would not cover geoscience and the social and behavioral sciences.

In 2008, he expressed concern about foreign-born students coming to the United States to obtain advanced academic degrees and then returning to their countries of origin. He opposes requiring states to adopt federal education standards.

Culberson was a strong advocate for the multiple flyby and lander missions to the Jovian moon Europa. When he lost his seat to his Democratic opponent Lizzie Pannill Fletcher in the 2018 election, support for the lander mission declined.

U.S. House of Representatives
Preceded by Bill Archer	Member of the U.S. House of Representatives from Texas's 7th congressional district 2001–2019	Succeeded by Lizzie Fletcher
U.S. order of precedence (ceremonial)
Preceded by Larry Combest as Former U.S. Representative	Order of precedence of the United States as Former U.S. Representative	Succeeded by Louie Gohmert as Former U.S. Representative
