= Politics in America (CQ Press) =

Politics in America (PIA) is a reference work comprising non-partisan profiles and assessments of every member of the United States Congress published biennially by CQ Press. Compiled by a staff of more than three dozen Congressional Quarterly reporters and editors, the profiles offer concise and candid analysis of personalities, political styles, legislative agendas, political ambitions, and reputations of members at home and on Capitol Hill. Detailed state and district information plus a wealth of information and data on campaign finance, partisan caucuses, standing committees, and other member facts round out the book.

== Data included in profiles ==
- Biographical data
- Committee assignments
- Interest group ratings
- Contact information
- State-by-state and congressional voting demographics
- Campaign finance statistics and election results
- Leadership, caucuses, and member statistics
