= United States House Committee on Appropriations =

Standing committee of the United States House of Representatives

House Appropriations Committee
Standing committee
- Active United States House of Representatives; 119th Congress

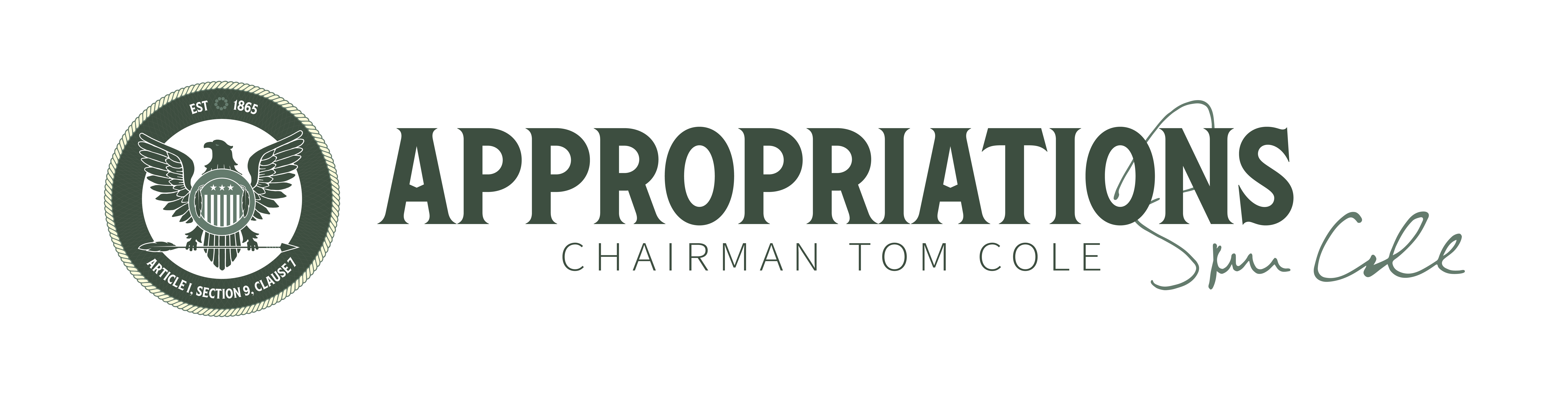
- Committee logo

History
- Formed: December 11, 1865

Leadership
- Chair: Tom Cole (R); Since April 10, 2024
- Ranking Member: Rosa DeLauro (D); Since January 3, 2023

Structure
- Seats: 63 (63 currently filled) 35/35 28/28
- Political parties: Majority (35): Republican (35); Minority (28): Democratic (28)

Jurisdiction
- Policy areas: Appropriations bills, Discretionary spending, Rescission bills
- Oversight authority: Federal government of the United States
- Senate counterpart: Senate Committee on Appropriations

Subcommittees
- Agriculture, Rural Development, Food and Drug Administration, and Related Agencies; Defense; National Security, Department of State, and Related Programs; Interior, Environment, and Related Agencies; Labor, Health and Human Services, Education, and Related Agencies; Energy and Water Development and Related Agencies; Homeland Security; Military Construction, Veterans Affairs, and Related Agencies; Commerce, Justice, Science, and Related Agencies; Transportation, Housing and Urban Development, and Related Agencies; Financial Services and General Government; Legislative Branch

Meeting place
- H307, The Capitol; Washington, D.C. 20515

Website
- appropriations.house.gov (Republican) democrats-appropriations.house.gov (Democratic)

Phone number
- (202)-225-2771

The United States House Committee on Appropriations is a committee of the United States House of Representatives that is responsible for passing appropriation bills along with its Senate counterpart. The bills passed by the Appropriations Committee regulate expenditures of money by the government of the United States. As such, it is one of the most powerful committees, and its members are seen as influential.

== History ==
The constitutional basis for the Appropriations Committee comes from Article I, Section 9, Clause 7 of the U.S. Constitution, which says:

No money shall be drawn from the treasury, but in consequence of appropriations made by law; and a regular statement and account of receipts and expenditures of all public money shall be published from time to time.

This clearly delegated the power of appropriating money to Congress, but was vague beyond that. Originally, the power of appropriating was taken by the Committee on Ways and Means, but the United States Civil War placed a large burden on the Congress, and at the end of that conflict, a reorganization occurred.

=== Early years ===
The Committee on Appropriations was created on December 11, 1865, when the U.S. House of Representatives separated the tasks of the Committee on Ways and Means into three parts. The passage of legislation affecting taxes remained with Ways and Means. The power to regulate banking was transferred to the Committee on Banking and Commerce. The power to appropriate money—to control the federal purse strings—was given to the newly created Appropriations Committee.

At the time of creation the membership of the committee stood at nine; it currently has 61 members. The power of the committee has only grown since its founding; many of its members and chairs have gone on to even higher posts. Four of them—Samuel Randall (D-PA), Joseph Cannon (R-IL), Joseph Byrns (D-TN) and Nancy Pelosi (D-CA)—have gone on to become the Speaker of the United States House of Representatives; one, James Garfield, has gone on to become President of the United States.

The root of the Appropriations Committee's power is its ability to disburse funds, and thus as the United States federal budget has risen, so has the power of the Appropriations Committee. The first federal budget of the United States, in 1789, was for $639,000—a hefty sum for the time, but a much smaller amount relative to the economy than the federal budget would later become. By the time the Appropriations committee was founded, the Civil War and inflation had raised expenditures to roughly $1.3 billion, increasing the clout of Appropriations. Expenditures continued to follow this pattern—rising sharply during wars before settling down—for over 100 years.

Another important development for Appropriations occurred in the presidency of Warren G. Harding. Harding was the first president of the United States to deliver a budget proposal to Congress.

=== Recent times ===
In May 1945, when U.S. Representative Albert J. Engel queried extra funds for the Manhattan Project, the administration approved a visit to the Clinton Engineer Works at Oak Ridge (CEW) (and one to HEW if desired) by selected legislators, including Engel, Mahon, Snyder, John Taber and Clarence Cannon (the committee chair). About a month earlier Taber and Cannon had nearly come to blows over the expenditure but, after visiting CEW, Taber asked General Groves and Colonel Nichols "Are you sure you're asking for enough money?" Cannon commented "Well, I never expected to hear that from you, John."

In the early 1970s, the Appropriations Committee faced a crisis. President Richard Nixon began "impounding" funds, not allowing them to be spent, even when Congress had specifically appropriated money for a cause. This was essentially a line-item veto. Numerous court cases were filed by outraged interest groups and members of Congress. Eventually, the sense that Congress needed to regain control of the budget process led to the adoption of the Congressional Budget and Impoundment Control Act of 1974, which finalized the budget process in its current form.

== Role ==
The Appropriations committee is widely recognized by political scientists as one of the "power committees", since it holds the power of the purse. Openings on the Appropriations committee are often hotly demanded, and are doled out as rewards. It is one of the "exclusive" committees of the House, meaning its members typically sit on no other committee. Under House Rules, an exception to this is that five Members of the Appropriations Committee must serve on the House Budget Committee—three for the majority and two for the minority. Much of the power of the committee comes from the inherent utility of controlling spending. Its subcommittee chairs are often called "Cardinals", likening them to the most senior members of the Catholic Church, because of the power they wield over the budget.

Since the House is elected from single-member districts, securing financing for projects in the district can help a member to be reelected as the funds can create jobs and raise economic performance. This type of spending is derided by critics as pork barrel spending, while those who engage in it generally defend it as necessary and appropriate expenditure of government funds. The members of the Appropriations committee can do this better than most, and better direct funding towards another member's district, increasing the stature of committee members in the House and helping them gain support for their priorities, including seeking leadership positions or other honors.

The committee tends to be less partisan than other committees or the House overall. While the minority party will offer amendments during committee consideration, appropriations bills often get significant bipartisan support, both in committee and on the House floor. This atmosphere can be attributed to the fact that all committee members have a compelling interest in ensuring legislation will contain money for their own districts. Conversely, because members of this committee can easily steer money to their home districts, it is considered very difficult to unseat a member of this committee at an election—especially if he or she is a "Cardinal".

In addition, the ability to appropriate money is useful to lobbyists and interest groups; as such, being on Appropriations makes it easier to collect campaign contributions (see: campaign finance).

== Jurisdiction ==
The Appropriations Committee has one of the largest jurisdictions of any federal committee. Under Rule 10 of the House rules, the committee's jurisdiction is defined as:

1. Appropriation of the revenue for the support of the Government
2. Rescissions of appropriations contained in appropriations Acts
3. Transfers of unexpected balances
4. Bills and joint resolutions reported by other committees that provide new entitlement authority as defined in section 3(9) of the Congressional Budget Act of 1974 and referred to the committee under clause 4(a)(2)

== Members, 119th Congress ==
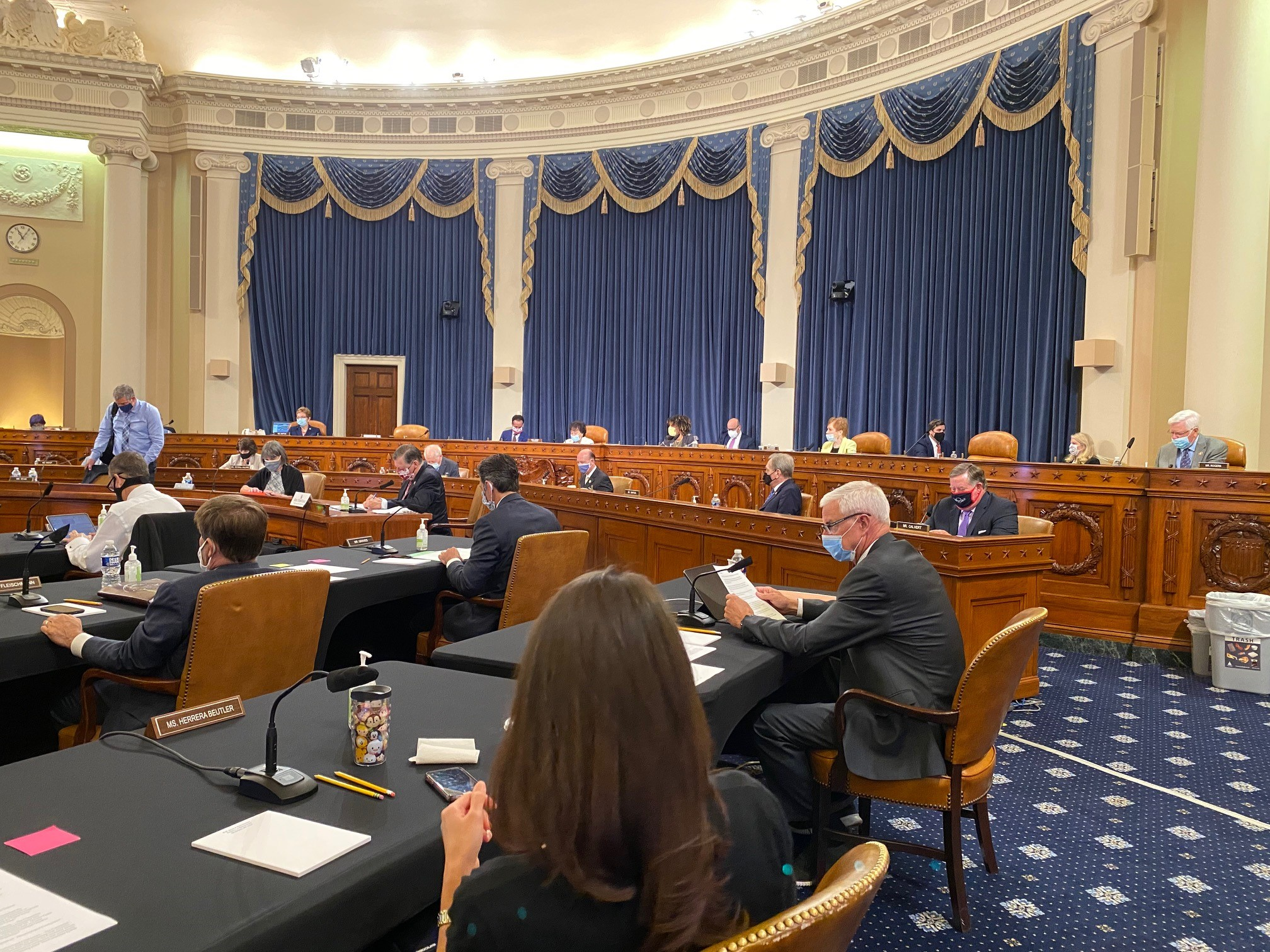
A committee meeting in July 2020

Majority	Minority
Tom Cole, Oklahoma, Chair; Hal Rogers, Kentucky; Robert Aderholt, Alabama; Mike Simpson, Idaho; John Carter, Texas; Ken Calvert, California; Mario Díaz-Balart, Florida, Vice Chair; Steve Womack, Arkansas; Chuck Fleischmann, Tennessee; David Joyce, Ohio; Andy Harris, Maryland; Mark Amodei, Nevada; David Valadao, California; Dan Newhouse, Washington; John Moolenaar, Michigan; John Rutherford, Florida; Ben Cline, Virginia; Guy Reschenthaler, Pennsylvania; Ashley Hinson, Iowa; Tony Gonzales, Texas; Julia Letlow, Louisiana; Michael Cloud, Texas; Michael Guest, Mississippi; Ryan Zinke, Montana; Andrew Clyde, Georgia; Stephanie Bice, Oklahoma; Scott Franklin, Florida; Jake Ellzey, Texas; Juan Ciscomani, Arizona; Chuck Edwards, North Carolina; Mark Alford, Missouri; Nick LaLota, New York; Dale Strong, Alabama; Celeste Maloy, Utah; Riley Moore, West Virginia; Jefferson Shreve, Indiana (from April 21, 2026)	Rosa DeLauro, Connecticut, Ranking Member; Steny Hoyer, Maryland; Marcy Kaptur, Ohio; Jim Clyburn, South Carolina; Sanford Bishop, Georgia; Betty McCollum, Minnesota; Debbie Wasserman Schultz, Florida; Henry Cuellar, Texas; Chellie Pingree, Maine; Mike Quigley, Illinois; Grace Meng, New York; Mark Pocan, Wisconsin; Pete Aguilar, California; Lois Frankel, Florida; Bonnie Watson Coleman, New Jersey; Norma Torres, California; Ed Case, Hawaii; Adriano Espaillat, New York; Josh Harder, California; Lauren Underwood, Illinois; Susie Lee, Nevada; Joseph Morelle, New York, Vice Ranking Member; Mike Levin, California; Madeleine Dean, Pennsylvania; Veronica Escobar, Texas; Frank J. Mrvan, Indiana; Marie Gluesenkamp Perez, Washington; Glenn Ivey, Maryland

Resolutions electing members: H.Res. 14 (Chair), H.Res. 15 (Ranking Member), H.Res. 21 (R), H.Res. 22 (D), H.Res. 39 (Re-ranking Maloy), H.Res. 1201 (Shreve)

== Subcommittees ==
=== Reorganization in 2007 ===
In 2007, the number of subcommittees was increased to 12 at the start of the 110th Congress. This reorganization, developed by Chair David Obey and his Senate counterpart, Robert Byrd, for the first time provided for common subcommittee structures between both houses, a move that both chairs hoped will allow Congress to "complete action on each of the government funding on time for the first time since 1994".

The new structure added the Subcommittee on Financial Services and General Government, and transferred jurisdiction over Legislative Branch appropriations from the full committee to a newly reinstated Legislative Branch Subcommittee, which had not existed since the 108th Congress.

=== List of subcommittees ===
Subcommittee	Chair	Ranking Member
Agriculture, Rural Development, Food and Drug Administration, and Related Agencies	Andy Harris (R-MD)	Sanford Bishop (D-GA)
Commerce, Justice, Science, and Related Agencies	Hal Rogers (R-KY)	Grace Meng (D-NY)
Defense	Ken Calvert (R-CA)	Betty McCollum (D-MN)
Energy and Water Development and Related Agencies	Chuck Fleischmann (R-TN)	Marcy Kaptur (D-OH)
Financial Services and General Government	David Joyce (R-OH)	Steny Hoyer (D-MD)
Homeland Security	Mark Amodei (R-NV)	Henry Cuellar (D-TX)
Interior, Environment, and Related Agencies	Mike Simpson (R-ID)	Chellie Pingree (D-ME)
Labor, Health and Human Services, Education, and Related Agencies	Robert Aderholt (R-AL)	Rosa DeLauro (D-CT)
Legislative Branch	David Valadao (R-CA)	Adriano Espaillat (D-NY)
Military Construction, Veterans Affairs, and Related Agencies	John Carter (R-TX)	Debbie Wasserman Schultz (D-FL)
National Security, Department of State, and Related Programs	Mario Diaz-Balart (R-FL)	Lois Frankel (D-FL)
Transportation, Housing and Urban Development, and Related Agencies	Steve Womack (R-AR)	Jim Clyburn (D-SC)

== Historical rosters ==
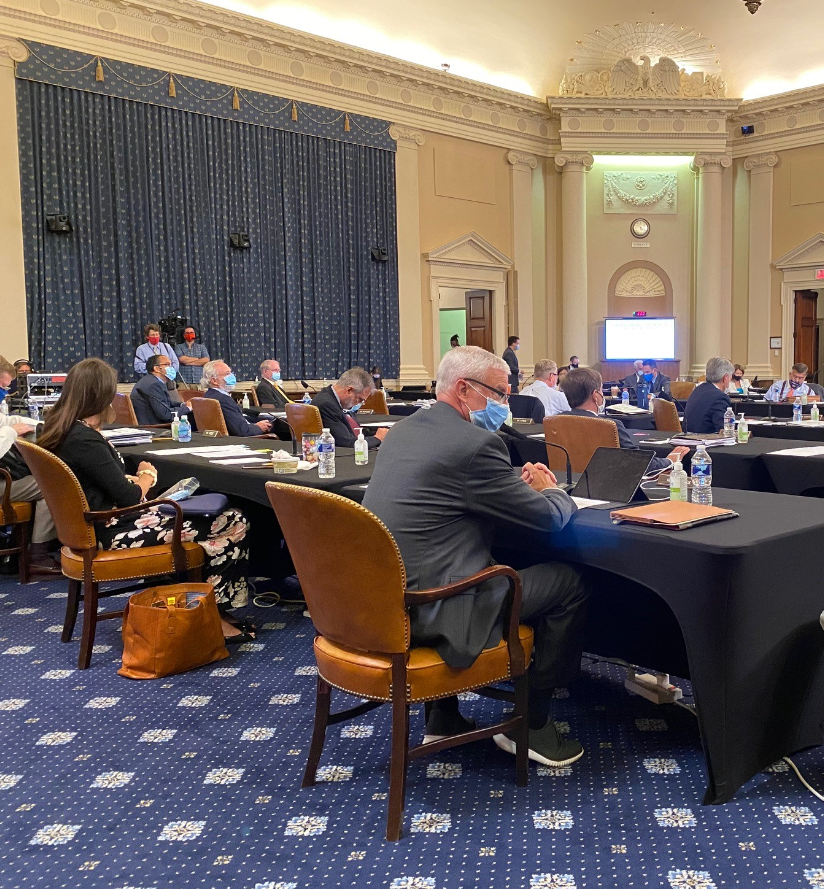
A social distancing-style meeting of the committee in July 2020

=== 118th Congress ===
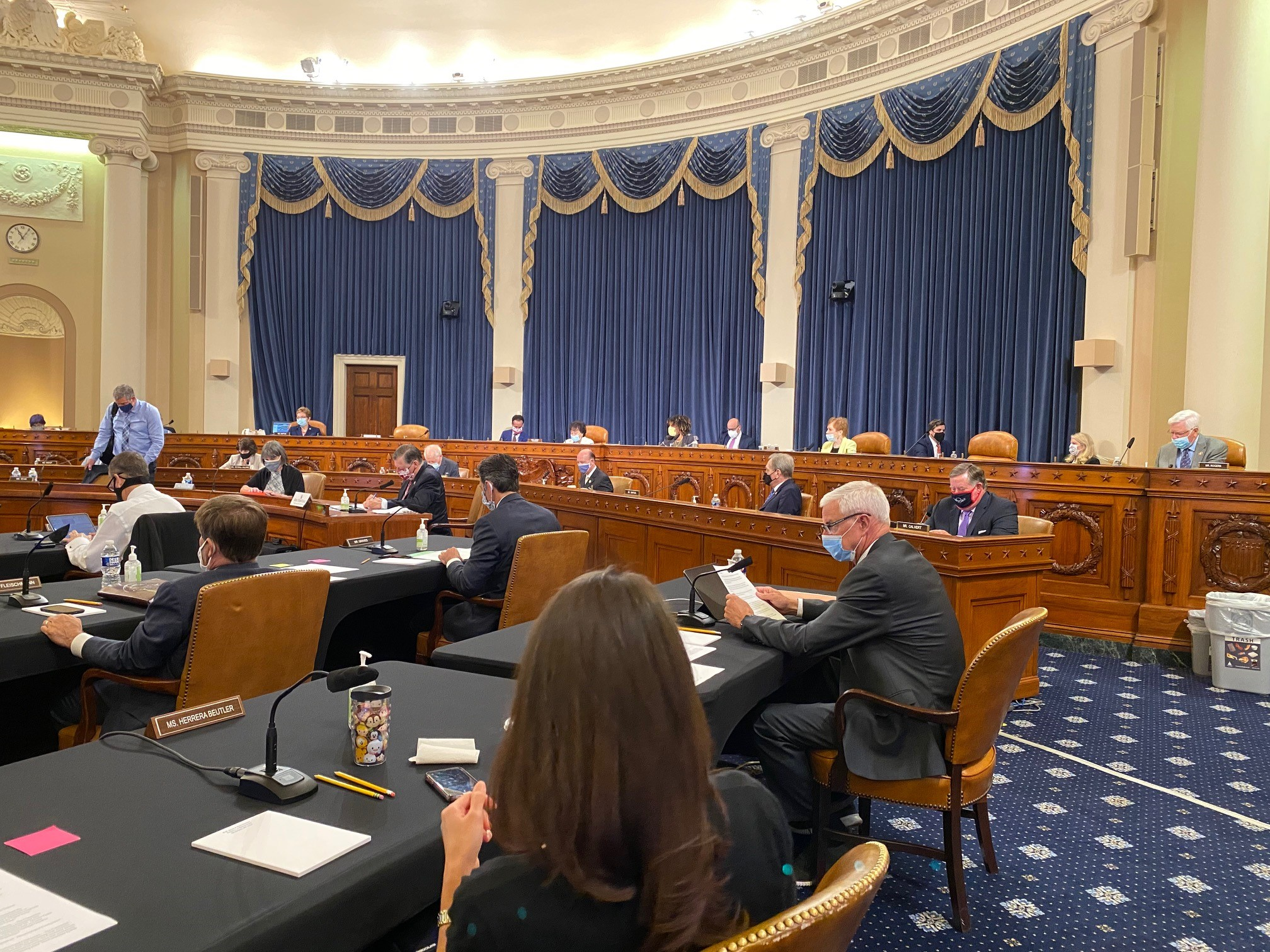
A committee meeting in July 2020

Majority	Minority
Tom Cole, Oklahoma, Chair; Hal Rogers, Kentucky; Kay Granger, Texas (Chair until April 10, 2024); Robert Aderholt, Alabama; Mike Simpson, Idaho; John Carter, Texas; Ken Calvert, California; Mario Díaz-Balart, Florida; Steve Womack, Arkansas; Chuck Fleischmann, Tennessee; David Joyce, Ohio; Andy Harris, Maryland; Mark Amodei, Nevada; Chris Stewart, Utah (until September 18, 2023); David Valadao, California; Dan Newhouse, Washington; John Moolenaar, Michigan; John Rutherford, Florida; Ben Cline, Virginia; Guy Reschenthaler, Pennsylvania; Mike Garcia, California; Ashley Hinson, Iowa; Tony Gonzales, Texas; Julia Letlow, Louisiana; Michael Cloud, Texas; Michael Guest, Mississippi; Ryan Zinke, Montana; Andrew Clyde, Georgia; Jake LaTurner, Kansas; Jerry Carl, Alabama; Stephanie Bice, Oklahoma; Scott Franklin, Florida; Jake Ellzey, Texas; Juan Ciscomani, Arizona; Chuck Edwards, North Carolina (from December 6, 2023)	Rosa DeLauro, Connecticut, Ranking Member; Steny Hoyer, Maryland; Marcy Kaptur, Ohio; Sanford Bishop, Georgia; Barbara Lee, California; Betty McCollum, Minnesota; Dutch Ruppersberger, Maryland; Debbie Wasserman Schultz, Florida; Henry Cuellar, Texas; Chellie Pingree, Maine; Mike Quigley, Illinois; Derek Kilmer, Washington; Matt Cartwright, Pennsylvania; Grace Meng, New York, Vice Ranking Member; Mark Pocan, Wisconsin; Pete Aguilar, California; Lois Frankel, Florida; Bonnie Watson Coleman, New Jersey; Norma Torres, California; Ed Case, Hawaii; Adriano Espaillat, New York; Josh Harder, California; Jennifer Wexton, Virginia; David Trone, Maryland; Lauren Underwood, Illinois; Susie Lee, Nevada; Joseph Morelle, New York

Resolutions electing members: H.Res. 14 (Chair), H.Res. 15 (Ranking Member), H.Res. 56 (R), H.Res. 60 (D), H.Res. 913 (R), H.Res. 1133 (New chair)

Subcommittees

Subcommittee	Chair	Ranking Member
Agriculture, Rural Development, Food and Drug Administration, and Related Agencies	Andy Harris (R-MD)	Sanford Bishop (D-GA)
Commerce, Justice, Science, and Related Agencies	Hal Rogers (R-KY)	Matt Cartwright (D-PA)
Defense	Ken Calvert (R-CA)	Betty McCollum (D-MN)
Energy and Water Development	Chuck Fleischmann (R-TN)	Marcy Kaptur (D-OH)
Financial Services and General Government	David Joyce (R-OH)	Steny Hoyer (D-MD)
Homeland Security	Mark Amodei (R-NV)	Henry Cuellar (D-TX)
Interior, Environment, and Related Agencies	Mike Simpson (R-ID)	Chellie Pingree (D-ME)
Labor, Health and Human Services, Education, and Related Agencies	Robert Aderholt (R-AL)	Rosa DeLauro (D-CT)
Legislative Branch	David Valadao (R-CA)	Adriano Espaillat (D-NY)
Military Construction, Veterans Affairs, and Related Agencies	John Carter (R-TX)	Debbie Wasserman Schultz (D-FL)
State, Foreign Operations, and Related Programs	Mario Diaz-Balart (R-FL)	Barbara Lee (D-CA)
Transportation, Housing and Urban Development, and Related Agencies	Steve Womack (R-AR)	Mike Quigley (D-IL)

=== 117th Congress ===
Majority	Minority
Rosa DeLauro, Connecticut, Chair; Marcy Kaptur, Ohio; David Price, North Carolina; Lucille Roybal-Allard, California; Sanford Bishop, Georgia; Barbara Lee, California; Betty McCollum, Minnesota; Tim Ryan, Ohio; Dutch Ruppersberger, Maryland; Debbie Wasserman Schultz, Florida; Henry Cuellar, Texas; Chellie Pingree, Maine; Mike Quigley, Illinois; Derek Kilmer, Washington; Matt Cartwright, Pennsylvania; Grace Meng, New York; Mark Pocan, Wisconsin; Katherine Clark, Massachusetts; Pete Aguilar, California; Lois Frankel, Florida; Cheri Bustos, Illinois; Bonnie Watson Coleman, New Jersey; Brenda Lawrence, Michigan, Vice Chair; Norma Torres, California; Charlie Crist, Florida; Ann Kirkpatrick, Arizona; Ed Case, Hawaii; Adriano Espaillat, New York; Josh Harder, California; Jennifer Wexton, Virginia; David Trone, Maryland; Lauren Underwood, Illinois; Susie Lee, Nevada; Joseph Morelle, New York (from September 14, 2022)	Kay Granger, Texas, Ranking Member; Hal Rogers, Kentucky; Robert Aderholt, Alabama; Mike Simpson, Idaho; John Carter, Texas; Ken Calvert, California; Tom Cole, Oklahoma; Mario Díaz-Balart, Florida; Steve Womack, Arkansas; Jeff Fortenberry, Nebraska; Chuck Fleischmann, Tennessee; Jaime Herrera Beutler, Washington; David Joyce, Ohio; Andy Harris, Maryland; Mark Amodei, Nevada; Chris Stewart, Utah; Steven Palazzo, Mississippi; David Valadao, California; Dan Newhouse, Washington; John Moolenaar, Michigan; John Rutherford, Florida; Ben Cline, Virginia; Guy Reschenthaler, Pennsylvania; Mike Garcia, California; Ashley Hinson, Iowa; Tony Gonzales, Texas; Julia Letlow, Louisiana

Resolutions electing members: H.Res. 9 (Chair), H.Res. 10 (Ranking Member), H.Res. 62 (D), H.Res. 63 (R), H.Res. 1347 (D)

Subcommittees

Subcommittee	Chair	Ranking Member
Agriculture, Rural Development, Food and Drug Administration, and Related Agencies	Sanford Bishop (D-GA)	Jeff Fortenberry (R-NE)
Commerce, Justice, Science, and Related Agencies	Matt Cartwright (D-PA)	Robert Aderholt (R-AL)
Defense	Betty McCollum (D-MN)	Ken Calvert (R-CA)
Energy and Water Development	Marcy Kaptur (D-OH)	Mike Simpson (R-ID)
Financial Services and General Government	Mike Quigley (D-IL)	Steve Womack (R-AR)
Homeland Security	Lucille Roybal-Allard (D-CA)	Chuck Fleischmann (R-TN)
Interior, Environment, and Related Agencies	Chellie Pingree (D-ME)	Dave Joyce (R-OH)
Labor, Health and Human Services, Education, and Related Agencies	Rosa DeLauro (D-CT)	Tom Cole (R-OK)
Legislative Branch	Tim Ryan (D-OH)	Jaime Herrera Beutler (R-WA)
Military Construction, Veterans Affairs, and Related Agencies	Debbie Wasserman Schultz (D-FL)	John Carter (R-TX)
State, Foreign Operations, and Related Programs	Barbara Lee (D-CA)	Hal Rogers (R-KY)
Transportation, Housing and Urban Development, and Related Agencies	David Price (D-NC)	Mario Díaz-Balart (R-FL)

=== 116th Congress ===
Membership
Majority	Minority
Nita Lowey, New York, Chair; Marcy Kaptur, Ohio; Pete Visclosky, Indiana; José E. Serrano, New York; Rosa DeLauro, Connecticut; David Price, North Carolina; Lucille Roybal-Allard, California; Sanford Bishop, Georgia; Barbara Lee, California; Betty McCollum, Minnesota; Tim Ryan, Ohio; Dutch Ruppersberger, Maryland; Debbie Wasserman Schultz, Florida; Henry Cuellar, Texas; Chellie Pingree, Maine; Mike Quigley, Illinois; Derek Kilmer, Washington; Matt Cartwright, Pennsylvania; Grace Meng, New York; Mark Pocan, Wisconsin; Katherine Clark, Massachusetts; Pete Aguilar, California, Vice Chair; Lois Frankel, Florida; Cheri Bustos, Illinois; Bonnie Watson Coleman, New Jersey; Brenda Lawrence, Michigan; Norma Torres, California; Charlie Crist, Florida; Ann Kirkpatrick, Arizona; Ed Case, Hawaii	Kay Granger, Texas, Ranking Member; Hal Rogers, Kentucky; Robert Aderholt, Alabama; Mike Simpson, Idaho; John Carter, Texas; Ken Calvert, California; Tom Cole, Oklahoma, Vice Ranking Member; Mario Díaz-Balart, Florida; Tom Graves, Georgia; Steve Womack, Arkansas; Jeff Fortenberry, Nebraska; Chuck Fleischmann, Tennessee; Jaime Herrera Beutler, Washington; David Joyce, Ohio; Andy Harris, Maryland; Martha Roby, Alabama; Mark Amodei, Nevada; Chris Stewart, Utah; Steven Palazzo, Mississippi; Dan Newhouse, Washington; John Moolenaar, Michigan; John Rutherford, Florida; Will Hurd, Texas

Resolutions electing members: H.Res. 7 (Chair), H.Res. 8 (Ranking Member), H.Res. 42 (D), H.Res. 68 (R)

Subcommittees

Subcommittee	Chair	Ranking Member
Agriculture, Rural Development, Food and Drug Administration, and Related Agencies	Sanford Bishop (D-GA)	Jeff Fortenberry (R-NE)
Commerce, Justice, Science, and Related Agencies	José E. Serrano (D-NY)	Robert Aderholt (R-AL)
Defense	Pete Visclosky (D-IN)	Ken Calvert (R-CA)
Energy and Water Development	Marcy Kaptur (D-OH)	Mike Simpson (R-ID)
Financial Services and General Government	Mike Quigley (D-IL)	Steve Womack (R-AR)
Homeland Security	Lucille Roybal-Allard (D-CA)	Chuck Fleischmann (R-TN)
Interior, Environment, and Related Agencies	Betty McCollum (D-MN)	Dave Joyce (R-OH)
Labor, Health and Human Services, Education, and Related Agencies	Rosa DeLauro (D-CT)	Tom Cole (R-OK)
Legislative Branch	Tim Ryan (D-OH)	Jaime Herrera Beutler (R-WA)
Military Construction, Veterans Affairs, and Related Agencies	Debbie Wasserman Schultz (D-FL)	John Carter (R-TX)
State, Foreign Operations, and Related Programs	Nita Lowey (D-NY)	Hal Rogers (R-KY)
Transportation, Housing and Urban Development, and Related Agencies	David Price (D-NC)	Mario Díaz-Balart (R-FL)

=== 115th Congress ===
Membership, 115th Congress
Majority	Minority
Rodney Frelinghuysen, New Jersey, Chair; Hal Rogers, Kentucky; Robert Aderholt, Alabama; Kay Granger, Texas; Mike Simpson, Idaho; John Culberson, Texas; John Carter, Texas; Ken Calvert, California; Tom Cole, Oklahoma; Mario Díaz-Balart, Florida; Charlie Dent, Pennsylvania; Tom Graves, Georgia; Kevin Yoder, Kansas; Steve Womack, Arkansas; Jeff Fortenberry, Nebraska; Tom Rooney, Florida; Chuck Fleischmann, Tennessee; Jaime Herrera Beutler, Washington; David Joyce, Ohio; David Valadao, California; Andy Harris, Maryland; Martha Roby, Alabama; Mark Amodei, Nevada; Chris Stewart, Utah; David Young, Iowa; Evan Jenkins, West Virginia; Steven Palazzo, Mississippi; Dan Newhouse, Washington; John Moolenaar, Michigan; Scott Taylor, Virginia	Nita Lowey, New York, Ranking Member; Marcy Kaptur, Ohio; Pete Visclosky, Indiana; José Serrano, New York; Rosa DeLauro, Connecticut; David Price, North Carolina; Lucille Roybal-Allard, California; Sanford Bishop, Georgia; Barbara Lee, California; Betty McCollum, Minnesota; Tim Ryan, Ohio; Dutch Ruppersberger, Maryland; Debbie Wasserman Schultz, Florida; Henry Cuellar, Texas; Chellie Pingree, Maine; Mike Quigley, Illinois; Derek Kilmer, Washington, Vice Ranking Member; Matt Cartwright, Pennsylvania; Grace Meng, New York; Mark Pocan, Wisconsin; Katherine Clark, Massachusetts; Pete Aguilar, California

=== 114th Congress ===
Members, 114th Congress
Majority	Minority
Hal Rogers, Kentucky, Chair; Rodney Frelinghuysen, New Jersey; Robert Aderholt, Alabama; Kay Granger, Texas; Mike Simpson, Idaho; John Culberson, Texas; Ander Crenshaw, Florida; John Carter, Texas; Ken Calvert, California; Tom Cole, Oklahoma; Mario Díaz-Balart, Florida; Charlie Dent, Pennsylvania; Tom Graves, Georgia; Kevin Yoder, Kansas; Steve Womack, Arkansas; Jeff Fortenberry, Nebraska; Tom Rooney, Florida; Chuck Fleischmann, Tennessee; Jaime Herrera Beutler, Washington; David Joyce, Ohio; David Valadao, California; Andy Harris, Maryland; Martha Roby, Alabama; Mark Amodei, Nevada; Chris Stewart, Utah; Scott Rigell, Virginia; David Jolly, Florida; David Young, Iowa; Evan Jenkins, West Virginia; Steven Palazzo, Mississippi	Nita Lowey, New York, Ranking Member; Marcy Kaptur, Ohio; Pete Visclosky, Indiana; José Serrano, New York; Rosa DeLauro, Connecticut; David Price, North Carolina; Lucille Roybal-Allard, California; Sam Farr, California; Sanford Bishop, Georgia; Barbara Lee, California; Mike Honda, California; Betty McCollum, Minnesota; Steve Israel, New York; Tim Ryan, Ohio; Dutch Ruppersberger, Maryland; Debbie Wasserman Schultz, Florida; Henry Cuellar, Texas; Chellie Pingree, Maine; Mike Quigley, Illinois; Derek Kilmer, Washington; Matt Cartwright, Pennsylvania

=== 113th Congress ===
Majority	Minority
Hal Rogers, Kentucky, Chair; Frank Wolf, Virginia; Jack Kingston, Georgia; Rodney Frelinghuysen, New Jersey; Tom Latham, Iowa; Robert Aderholt, Alabama; Kay Granger, Texas; Mike Simpson, Idaho; John Culberson, Texas; Ken Calvert, California; Tom Cole, Oklahoma; Mario Diaz-Balart, Florida; Charles Dent, Pennsylvania; Tom Graves, Georgia; Kevin Yoder, Kansas; Steve Womack, Arkansas; Alan Nunnelee, Mississippi; Jeff Fortenberry, Nebraska; Thomas Rooney, Florida; Charles Fleichmann, Tennessee; Jamie Herrera Butler, Washington; David Joyce, Ohio; David Valadao, California; Andy Harris, Maryland; Martha Roby, Alabama; Mark Amodei, Nevada; Chris Stewart, Utah	Nita Lowey, New York, Ranking Member; Marcy Kaptur, Ohio; Pete Visclosky, Indiana; José Serrano, New York; James Moran, Virginia; Ed Pastor, Arizona; Rosa DeLauro, Connecticut; David Price, North Carolina; Lucille Roybal-Allard, California; Sam Farr, California; Chaka Fattah, Pennsylvania; Sanford Bishop, Georgia; Barbara Lee, California; Adam Schiff, California; Mike Honda, California; Betty McCollum, Minnesota; Steve Israel, New York; Tim Ryan, Ohio; Debbie Wasserman Schultz, Florida; Henry Cuellar, Texas; Chellie Pingree, Maine; Mike Quigley, Illinois; William Owens, New York

== Leadership ==
Chairs
Name	Party	State	Start	End
Thaddeus Stevens	Republican	Pennsylvania	1865	1868
Elihu Washburne	Republican	Illinois	1868	1869
Henry Dawes	Republican	Massachusetts	1869	1871
James Garfield	Republican	Ohio	1871	1875
Samuel Randall	Democratic	Pennsylvania	1875	1876
William Holman	Democratic	Indiana	1876	1877
Hiester Clymer	Democratic	Pennsylvania	1877	
John Atkins	Democratic	Tennessee	1877	1881
Frank Hiscock	Republican	New York	1881	1883
Samuel Randall	Democratic	Pennsylvania	1883	1889
Joseph Cannon	Republican	Illinois	1889	1891
William Holman	Democratic	Indiana	1891	1893
Joseph Sayers	Democratic	Texas	1893	1895
Joseph Cannon	Republican	Illinois	1895	1903
James Hemenway	Republican	Indiana	1903	1905
James Tawney	Republican	Minnesota	1905	1911
John Fitzgerald	Democratic	New York	1911	1917
Swagar Sherley	Democratic	Kentucky	1917	1919
James Good	Republican	Iowa	1919	1921
Charles Davis	Republican	Minnesota	1921	1923
Martin Madden	Republican	Illinois	1923	1928
Daniel Anthony	Republican	Kansas	1928	1929
William Wood	Republican	Indiana	1929	1931
Jo Byrns	Democratic	Tennessee	1931	1933
Buck Buchanan	Democratic	Texas	1933	1937
Edward Taylor	Democratic	Colorado	1937	1941
Clarence Cannon	Democratic	Missouri	1941	1947
John Taber	Republican	New York	1947	1949
Clarence Cannon	Democratic	Missouri	1949	1953
John Taber	Republican	New York	1953	1955
Clarence Cannon	Democratic	Missouri	1955	1964
George Mahon	Democratic	Texas	1964	1979
Jamie Whitten	Democratic	Mississippi	1979	1993
William Natcher	Democratic	Kentucky	1993	1994
Dave Obey	Democratic	Wisconsin	1994	1995
Bob Livingston	Republican	Louisiana	1995	1999
Bill Young	Republican	Florida	1999	2005
Jerry Lewis	Republican	California	2005	2007
Dave Obey	Democratic	Wisconsin	2007	2011
Hal Rogers	Republican	Kentucky	2011	2017
Rodney Frelinghuysen	Republican	New Jersey	2017	2019
Nita Lowey	Democratic	New York	2019	2021
Rosa DeLauro	Democratic	Connecticut	2021	2023
Kay Granger	Republican	Texas	2023	2024
Tom Cole	Republican	Oklahoma	2024	present

Ranking members
Name	Party	State	Start	End
Daniel Voorhees	Democratic	Indiana	1865	1866
Edwin Wright	Democratic	New Jersey	1866	1867
Charles Phelps	Conservative	Maryland	1867	1868
William Niblack	Democratic	Indiana	1869	1873
Samuel Marshall	Democratic	Illinois	1873	1875
William Wheeler	Republican	New York	1875	1877
Eugene Hale	Republican	Maine	1877	1879
John Baker	Republican	Indiana	1879	1881
Joseph Blackburn	Democratic	Indiana	1881	1883
Warren Keifer	Republican	Indiana	1883	1885
Joseph Cannon	Republican	Illinois	1885	1889
Samuel Randall	Democratic	Illinois	1889	1890
William Forney	Democratic	Alabama	1890	1891
David Henderson	Republican	Iowa	1891	1895
Joseph Sayers	Democratic	Texas	1895	1899
Alexander Dockery	Democratic	Missouri	1899	
Leonidas Livingston	Democratic	Georgia	1899	1911
Joseph Cannon	Republican	Illinois	1911	1913
Frederick Gillett	Republican	Massachusetts	1913	1919
Jo Byrns	Democratic	Tennessee	1919	1931
William Wood	Republican	Indiana	1931	1933
John Taber	Republican	New York	1933	1947
Clarence Cannon	Democratic	Missouri	1947	1949
John Taber	Republican	New York	1949	1953
Clarence Cannon	Democratic	Missouri	1953	1955
John Taber	Republican	New York	1955	1963
Ben Jensen	Republican	Iowa	1963	1965
Frank Bow	Republican	Ohio	1965	1972
Charles Jonas	Republican	North Carolina	1972	1973
Al Cederberg	Republican	Michigan	1973	1978
Silvio Conte	Republican	Massachusetts	1979	1991
Joseph McDade	Republican	Pennsylvania	1991	1995
Dave Obey	Democratic	Wisconsin	1995	2007
Jerry Lewis	Republican	California	2007	2011
Norm Dicks	Democratic	Washington	2011	2013
Nita Lowey	Democratic	New York	2013	2019
Kay Granger	Republican	Texas	2019	2023
Rosa DeLauro	Democratic	Connecticut	2023	present

== See also ==
- 2015 United States federal appropriations
