= Brenda Lawrence =

American politician (born 1954)

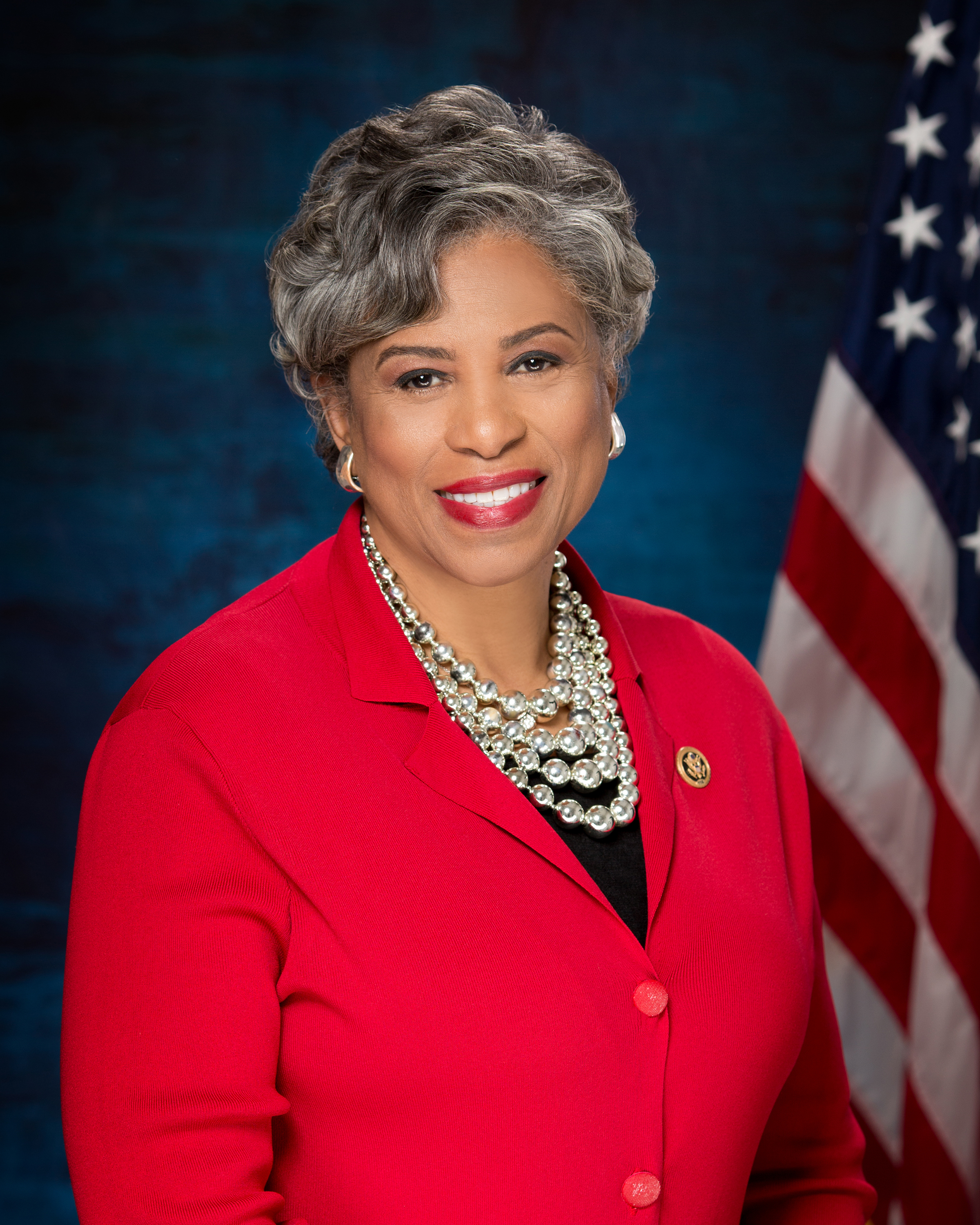
- Official portrait, 2018

Member of the U.S. House of Representatives from Michigan's 14th district
- In office January 3, 2015 – January 3, 2023
- Preceded by: Gary Peters
- Succeeded by: Constituency abolished

Personal details
- Born: Brenda Lulenar; October 18, 1954 (age 72) Detroit, Michigan, U.S.
- Party: Democratic
- Spouse: McArthur Lawrence (m. 1976)
- Children: 2
- Education: University of Detroit (attended); Central Michigan University (BA)

Brenda Lawrence (née Lulenar; born October 18, 1954) is an American retired politician and postal worker who served as the U.S. representative from Michigan's 14th congressional district from 2015 to 2023. A member of the Democratic Party, Lawrence served as mayor of Southfield, Michigan, from 2001 to 2015, and was the party's nominee for Oakland County executive in 2008 and for lieutenant governor in 2010. Her congressional district covered most of eastern Detroit, including downtown, and stretched west to take in portions of Oakland County, including Farmington Hills, Pontiac, and Lawrence's home in Southfield.

Redrawn into the 12th district, Lawrence did not seek reelection in 2022, and retired from Congress upon her fourth term's expiration in 2023.

== Early life and education ==
Lawrence grew up in Detroit's northeast side, on Lumpkin Street. She was raised by her grandparents after her mother died when she was three years old. She attended local schools, graduating from Detroit's Pershing High School. She then earned her bachelor's degree in public administration from Central Michigan University.

== Career ==
Lawrence had a 30-year career with the United States Postal Service, advancing to work in human resources. She retired in 2008. In the early-1990s, as an active member of the Parent-Teacher Association at her children's school, she sought and earned a seat on the Southfield Public Schools Board of Education. She served as president, vice president, and secretary of the board.

Lawrence's husband was a United Auto Workers member from Ford Motor Company.

=== Southfield politics ===
Lawrence got more deeply involved in local affairs. In 1997, she was elected to serve on Southfield's City Council, and in 1999 she was elected council president.

In 2001, Lawrence defeated longtime incumbent Donald Fracassi for the mayor's office, becoming the city's first African-American and first female mayor. She was reelected in 2005 without opposition. As mayor, she was invited by the United States House Committee on Oversight and Reform in 2008 to represent United States mayors in testimony about the mortgage crisis and its effect on American communities. She returned to Washington later that year to lobby Congress for a bridge loan for the American auto industry.

Lawrence served as a Michigan delegate to the 2004 Democratic National Convention. As a superdelegate at the 2008 Democratic National Convention, she endorsed U.S. Senator Barack Obama for president in June 2008.

She successfully sought a third term as mayor in 2009, defeating former Councilwoman Sylvia Jordan with nearly 80 percent of the vote. She was reelected to a fourth term unopposed in 2013.

=== Later campaigns ===
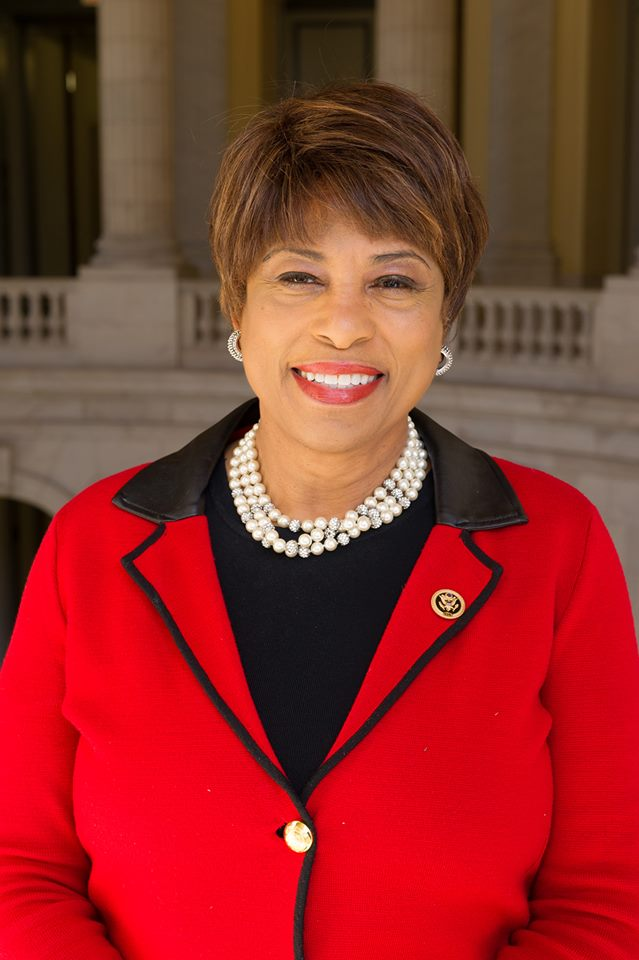
Lawrence's freshman Congressional portrait

==== 2008 Oakland County Executive election ====
In May 2008, Lawrence announced her candidacy for Oakland County Executive. She was unopposed for the Democratic nomination to unseat the longtime Republican incumbent, L. Brooks Patterson. Patterson won reelection 58% to 42%. Lawrence's challenge to the polarizing Patterson was identified as the strongest challenge he faced in his six elections for County Executive.

==== 2010 gubernatorial election ====
Lansing Mayor Virg Bernero named Lawrence as his running mate in his bid for governor of Michigan. She was formally nominated as the Democratic candidate for lieutenant governor at the Michigan Democratic Party convention in August 2010. They campaigned around the state promoting a "Main Street Agenda" with emphasis on their shared backgrounds as mayors.

As with the national election results, the 2010 general election in Michigan saw strong turnout and enthusiasm by Republican voters. Political pundits attributed the losses by Democrats, in part, to voter reaction to President Obama and term-limited Democratic Governor Jennifer Granholm. The Democratic gubernatorial ticket lost to Republican nominees Rick Snyder, a businessman, and Brian Calley, a State Representative, 58% to 40%. No statewide Democratic candidates were successful in 2010.

==== 2012 congressional election ====
In late 2011, Lawrence announced she would be running in the newly redrawn 14th congressional district. The district had previously been the 13th, represented by freshman Democrat Hansen Clarke. It was redrawn to take in a large slice of Oakland County, including Southfield. Clarke's home in Detroit was drawn into the neighboring 13th district, but he opted to follow most of his constituents into the 14th.

In the Democratic primary, the real contest in this heavily Democratic, black-majority district, Lawrence faced incumbent representatives Clarke and Gary Peters, both of whom lived outside the district, and former State Representative Mary D. Waters. Peters won with 47%, to Clarke's 35%, Lawrence's 13%, and Waters's 3%. Peters went on to win the general election.

==== 2014 congressional election ====
In May 2013, Peters announced that he would not be running for reelection in 2014. He instead ran for the U.S. Senate seat being vacated by retiring Democrat Carl Levin. On January 23, 2014, Lawrence announced that she would run for the 14th district for the second time.

Lawrence was the first candidate to submit signatures to the state in order to be on the August primary ballot, doing so in March. Other candidates that filed for the Democratic nomination were former Congressman Hansen Clarke of Detroit, State Representative Rudy Hobbs of Southfield and teacher Burgess D. Foster of Detroit.

During the course of the campaign's contribution reporting, Hobbs raised a total of $607,806, Lawrence $383,649 and Clarke $173,124; Burgess reported no contributions to the Federal Election Commission, indicating that he raised or spent less than $5,000. Michigan Congressman Sander Levin's Political Action Committee, GOALPAC, also spent hundreds of thousands of dollars to help elect Hobbs, who was previously employed on Levin's congressional staff.

Lawrence won the Democratic Party nomination on August 5, 2014, with 36% of the vote to Hobbs's 32%, Clarke's 31% and Foster's 1%. She took the most votes in Oakland County, carrying Southfield, Pontiac and Oak Park, as well as Royal Oak Township. Although it was expected that Clarke would convincingly win the portion of Detroit within the district, where he lives and had previously held public office, Lawrence was competitive in the city and won more votes than all other candidates from voters who cast their ballot on Election Day in Detroit.

As the Democratic nominee for Congress, she faced Republican nominee Christina Conyers of Detroit in the November general election. But Conyers withdrew from the race and Christina Barr of Pontiac was chosen as the Republican nominee. The district has a history of voting heavily for Democratic candidates. Also facing off against Lawrence in the November election was Libertarian Party nominee Leonard Schwartz of Oak Park and Green Party nominee Stephen Boyle of Detroit. Lawrence won with 78% of the vote, Barr took 20%, Schwartz 1% and Boyle 1%.

== U.S. House of Representatives ==
=== Committee assignments ===
- Committee on Oversight and Government Reform
  - Subcommittee on Government Operations
- United States House Appropriations Committee
  - Subcommittee on Transportation, and Housing and Urban Development
  - Subcommittee on Commerce, Justice, Science and Related Agencies
  - Subcommittee on Interior, Environment and Related Agencies

=== Caucus memberships ===
- New Democrat Coalition
- Congressional Progressive Caucus
- Congressional Black Caucus
- Congressional Arts Caucus
- Congressional Former Mayors' Caucus
- Medicare for All Caucus

=== Retirement ===
During the 2022 redistricting cycle, Lawrence's 14th district was eliminated as Detroit's congressional districts were radically reshuffled. While redistricting did create an open, heavily Democratic 13th district, the reshuffle combined with several deaths in Lawrence's family led to speculation that Lawrence would opt not to seek reelection. On January 4, 2022, Lawrence announced that she would retire, becoming the 25th Democrat to do so that cycle.

== Personal life ==
Lawrence was married to McArthur Lawrence prior to his death in 2023. They were high school sweethearts, having met outside the Midway Market corner store where he worked on Detroit's east side. They bought their first home on Detroit's northwest side. They had two children and a granddaughter.

== Electoral history ==
- 2016 Election for Congress, Michigan 14

Name	Percent
Brenda L. Lawrence	79%
Howard A. Klausner	19%
Gregory Creswell	2%
Marcia Squier	1%

- 2014 Election for Congress, Michigan 14

Name	Percent
Brenda L. Lawrence	78%
Christina Barr	20%
Leonard Schwartz	1%
Stephen Boyle	1%

- 2014 Democratic primary for Congress, Michigan 14

Name	Percent
Brenda L. Lawrence	36%
Rudy Hobbs	32%
Hansen Clarke	31%
Burgess Foster	1%

- 2013 Election for Mayor of Southfield

Name	Percent
Brenda L. Lawrence	100%

- 2012 Democratic primary for Congress, Michigan 14

Name	Percent
Gary Peters	47%
Hansen Clarke	35%
Brenda L. Lawrence	13%
Mary D. Waters	3%

- 2010 Election for Lieutenant Governor of Michigan

Name	Percent
Brian Calley	58%
Brenda L. Lawrence	40%

- 2009 Election for Mayor of Southfield

Name	Percent
Brenda L. Lawrence	77.6%
Sylvia Jordan	22.3%

- 2008 Election for Oakland County Executive

Name	Percent
L. Brooks Patterson	58.1%
Brenda L. Lawrence	41.6%

- 2005 Election for Mayor of Southfield

Name	Percent
Brenda L. Lawrence	100%

- 2001 Election for Mayor of Southfield

Name	Percent
Brenda L. Lawrence	52.6%
Donald Fracassi	47.4%

== See also ==
- List of African-American United States representatives
- Women in the United States House of Representatives

Party political offices
Preceded by John D. Cherry	Democratic nominee for Lieutenant Governor of Michigan; 2010	Succeeded by Lisa Brown
Preceded by Lois Frankel as Chair of the Democratic Women's Working Group	Chair of the Democratic Women's Caucus; 2019–2023; Served alongside: Lois Frankel, Jackie Speier	Succeeded by Lois Frankel
U.S. House of Representatives
Preceded by Gary Peters	Member of the U.S. House of Representatives from Michigan's 14th congressional district 2015–2023	Constituency abolished
Preceded by Susan Brooks	Chair of the Congressional Women's Caucus; 2019–2021	Succeeded by Madeleine Dean
U.S. order of precedence (ceremonial)
Preceded by Thaddeus McCotter as Former U.S. Representative	Order of precedence of the United States as Former U.S. Representative	Succeeded by Charles Canady as Former U.S. Representative
