= Nita Lowey =

American politician (1937–2025)

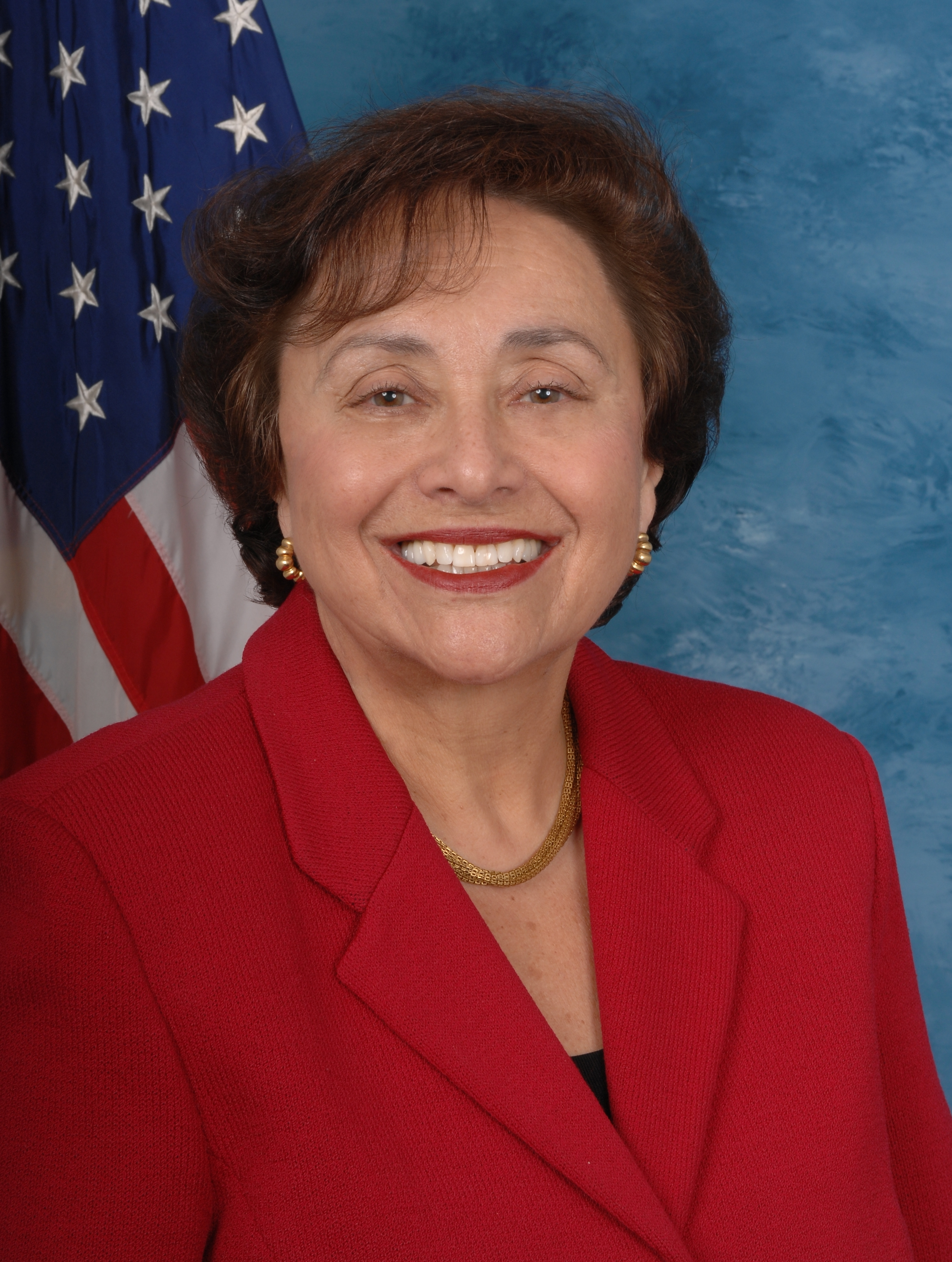
- Official portrait, 2007

Chair of the House Appropriations Committee
- In office January 3, 2019 – January 3, 2021
- Preceded by: Rodney Frelinghuysen
- Succeeded by: Rosa DeLauro

Member of the U.S. House of Representatives from New York
- In office January 3, 1989 – January 3, 2021
- Preceded by: Joe DioGuardi
- Succeeded by: Mondaire Jones
- Constituency: 20th district (1989–1993); 18th district (1993–2013); 17th district (2013–2021)

Personal details
- Born: Nita Sue Melnikoff; July 5, 1937 New York City, New York, U.S.
- Died: March 15, 2025 (aged 87) Harrison, New York, U.S.
- Party: Democratic
- Spouse: Stephen Lowey (m. 1961)
- Children: 3
- Education: Mount Holyoke College (BA)
- Lowey's voice Lowey supporting a resolution condemning the imprisonment of Salah Choudhury, a Bangladeshi journalist. Recorded March 13, 2007

Nita Sue Lowey (/ˈloʊi/ LOH-ee; née Melnikoff; July 5, 1937 – March 15, 2025) was an American politician who served as a U.S. representative from New York from 1989 until 2021. She was a member of the Democratic Party. Lowey also served as co-dean of the New York congressional delegation, along with former U.S. Representative Eliot Engel. Lowey's district was numbered as the 20th from 1989 to 1993, as the 18th from 1993 to 2013, and as the 17th beginning in 2013. The district included many of New York City's inner northern suburbs, such as White Plains, Purchase, Tarrytown, Mount Kisco, and Armonk.

In 2018, Lowey became the first woman to chair the House Appropriations Committee. She announced on October 10, 2019, that she would retire and not run for re-election to Congress in 2020.

== Early life, education, and early political career ==
Lowey was born in the Bronx in New York City on July 5, 1937, the daughter of Beatrice (Fleisher) and Jack Melnikoff. She graduated from the Bronx High School of Science as valedictorian of the class of 1955, and then from Mount Holyoke College with a bachelor's degree.

Lowey worked for Mario Cuomo's 1974 campaign for lieutenant governor of New York. She then served as an assistant secretary of state of New York for 13 years.

== U.S. House of Representatives ==
=== Elections ===
Lowey ran for the United States House of Representatives from New York's 20th congressional district in the 1988 election against incumbent Joe DioGuardi. She defeated DioGuardi. Her district was renumbered as the 18th district after the 1990 U.S. census and became the 17th after the 2010 U.S. census. For her entire tenure, Lowey represented a large slice of New York City's northern suburbs, including most of Westchester County and all of Rockland County. She used to represent some of the far northern portions of Queens and the Bronx until redistricting after the 2000 Census removed the New York City portion of her district.

Lowey considered running for the United States Senate in 2000, but stepped aside when First Lady of the United States Hillary Clinton announced her candidacy. Lowey was considered a top contender for appointment to Clinton's Senate seat after Clinton was nominated to be Secretary of State, but in a December 1, 2008, phone interview with the Associated Press, she stated that she was not interested in giving up her senior seat on the House Appropriations Committee.

=== Tenure ===
Lowey was known for her advocacy for women's health, environmental protection, foreign aid to developing nations, and efforts to fight AIDS, as well as her support for Israel.

Early in her congressional career, Lowey sponsored an earmark for the purpose of "dredging the Mamaroneck Harbor." According to the local newspaper, The Journal News, the dredging was proposed because "the harbor was becoming too shallow 'to accommodate the larger yachts.'"

Lowey supported the Public Broadcasting Service. During the 1990s, she appeared at a congressional hearing accompanied by Sesame Street characters Bert and Ernie.

In 2001–2002, Lowey served as the first female chair of the Democratic Congressional Campaign Committee.

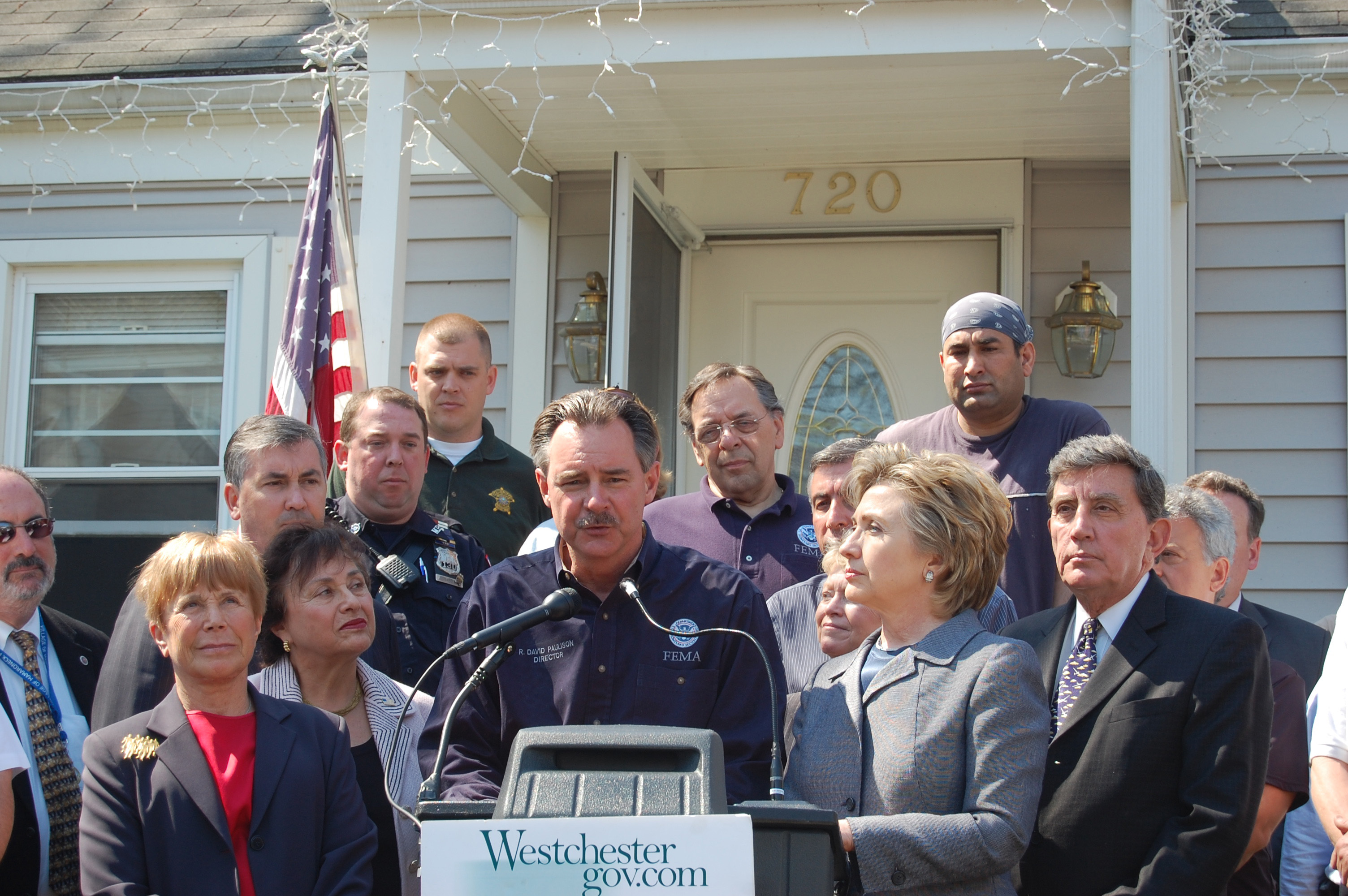
Congresswoman Lowey, with Federal Emergency Management Agency Director David Paulison and Senator Hillary Clinton, during 2007 floods in New York.

In early 2009, Lowey introduced the Transportation Security Workforce Enhancement Act, which calls for collective bargaining rights for federal workers at the TSA and Department of Homeland Security.

Lowey was critical of the Stupak-Pitts Amendment, which placed limits on taxpayer-funded abortions in the context of the Affordable Health Care for America Act. Because of the rancor and disruptions which marked many of the town hall meetings held in the summer of 2009 to discuss health care reform, Lowey chose to present her point of view on health care reform in a telephone conference call. Some constituents questioned the effectiveness of this approach.

In 2015, Lowey expressed her disappointment at Congress's failure to address Puerto Rico's budget problems.

Lowey announced her opposition to President Barack Obama's 2015 nuclear deal with Iran, stating the following:

In my judgment, sufficient safeguards are not in place to address the risks associated with the agreement. Relieving UN sanctions on conventional arms and ballistic missiles and releasing billions of dollars to the Iranian regime could lead to a dangerous regional weapons race and enable Iran to bolster its funding of terrorists. The deal does not explicitly require Iran to fully disclose its previous military work to the IAEA's satisfaction before sanctions relief is provided, and inspectors will not have immediate access to the most suspicious facilities. There are no clear accountability measures regarding punishment for minor violations, which could encourage Iran to cheat.

The Democrats won a majority in the U.S. House of Representatives in the 2018 elections. Subsequently, Lowey became the first Chairwoman of the House Committee on Appropriations. In 2019, Lowey helped negotiate an end to a 35-day government shutdown.

On October 10, 2019, two months after Democrat Mondaire Jones announced his intention to challenge her in a 2020 primary, Lowey announced she would not run for reelection in 2020.

=== 2016 DNC superdelegate ===
Like all Democratic members of Congress, Lowey was a superdelegate to the 2016 Democratic National Convention. Lowey pledged to support Hillary Clinton. When asked by the New York Daily News whether Lowey might switch her support to candidate Bernie Sanders if Sanders were to win the New York State Democratic presidential primary, Lowey's chief of staff responded, "absolutely not... Hillary Clinton is Congresswoman Lowey's friend, colleague and her constituent, and she is behind her 100%."

=== Committee assignments (116th Congress) ===
- Committee on Appropriations (chairwoman)
  - Subcommittee on State, Foreign Operations, and Related Programs (chairwoman)
  - As chairwoman of the full committee, Lowey may serve as an ex officio member of all subcommittees.

=== Caucus memberships ===
- Congressional Women's Caucus
- House Pro-Choice Caucus
- Hudson River Caucus
- United States Congressional International Conservation Caucus
- Israel Allies Caucus
- Congressional Arts Caucus
- National Eating Disorders Awareness Caucus
- Congressional Crohn's and Colitis Caucus
- Afterschool Caucuses

== Personal life ==
Lowey was married to Stephen Lowey, a named partner in the law firm of Lowey Dannenberg Cohen & Hart, P.C. in White Plains, New York. According to the West Corporation, his practice areas include securities law, antitrust law, and consumer protection.The Loweys have three children and eight grandchildren.

An estimate of Lowey's personal assets, based on financial disclosures members of Congress are required to provide (aside from that of personal residences and non-interest-bearing bank accounts), put her wealth at $41.2 million in 2010, based largely on her husband's investments. This figure was derived from a special investigative series of asset wealth of all U.S. Congressional Representatives conducted by The Washington Post.

Lowey was Jewish. She died from breast cancer at her home in Harrison, New York, on March 15, 2025, at the age of 87.

== See also ==
- List of Jewish members of the United States Congress
- Women in the United States House of Representatives

U.S. House of Representatives
Preceded by Joseph DioGuardi	Member of the U.S. House of Representatives from New York's 20th congressional district 1989–1993	Succeeded by Benjamin Gilman
Preceded by José Serrano	Member of the U.S. House of Representatives from New York's 18th congressional district 1993–2013	Succeeded by Sean Maloney
Preceded by Eliot Engel	Member of the U.S. House of Representatives from New York's 17th congressional district 2013–2021	Succeeded by Mondaire Jones
Preceded by Norm Dicks	Ranking Member of the House Appropriations Committee; 2013–2019	Succeeded by Kay Granger
Preceded by Rodney Frelinghuysen	Chair of the House Appropriations Committee; 2019–2021	Succeeded by Rosa DeLauro
Party political offices
Preceded by Patrick Kennedy	Chair of the Democratic Congressional Campaign Committee; 2001–2003	Succeeded by Bob Matsui
