= 2002 United States House of Representatives elections =

House elections for the 108th U.S. Congress

- November 5, 2002

All 435 seats in the United States House of Representatives 218 seats needed for a majority
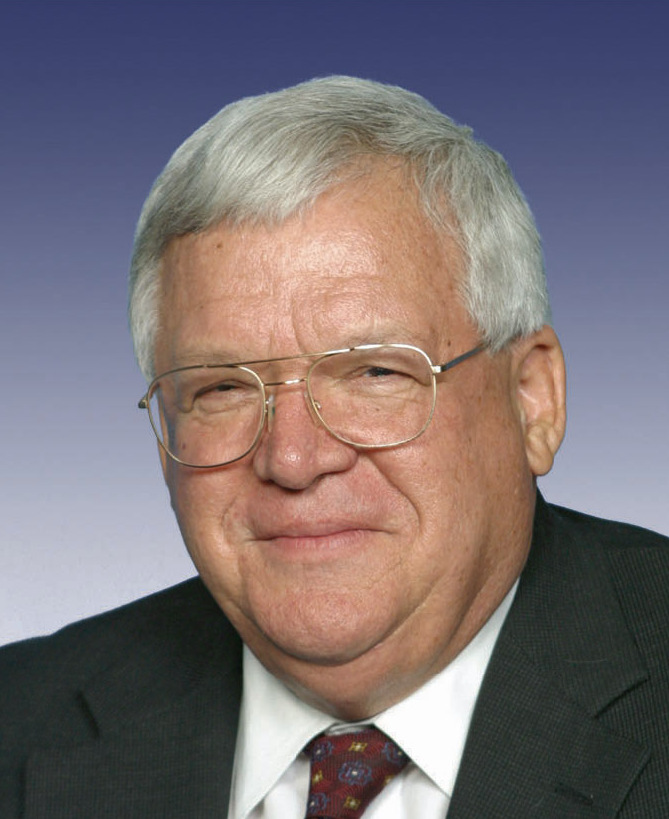

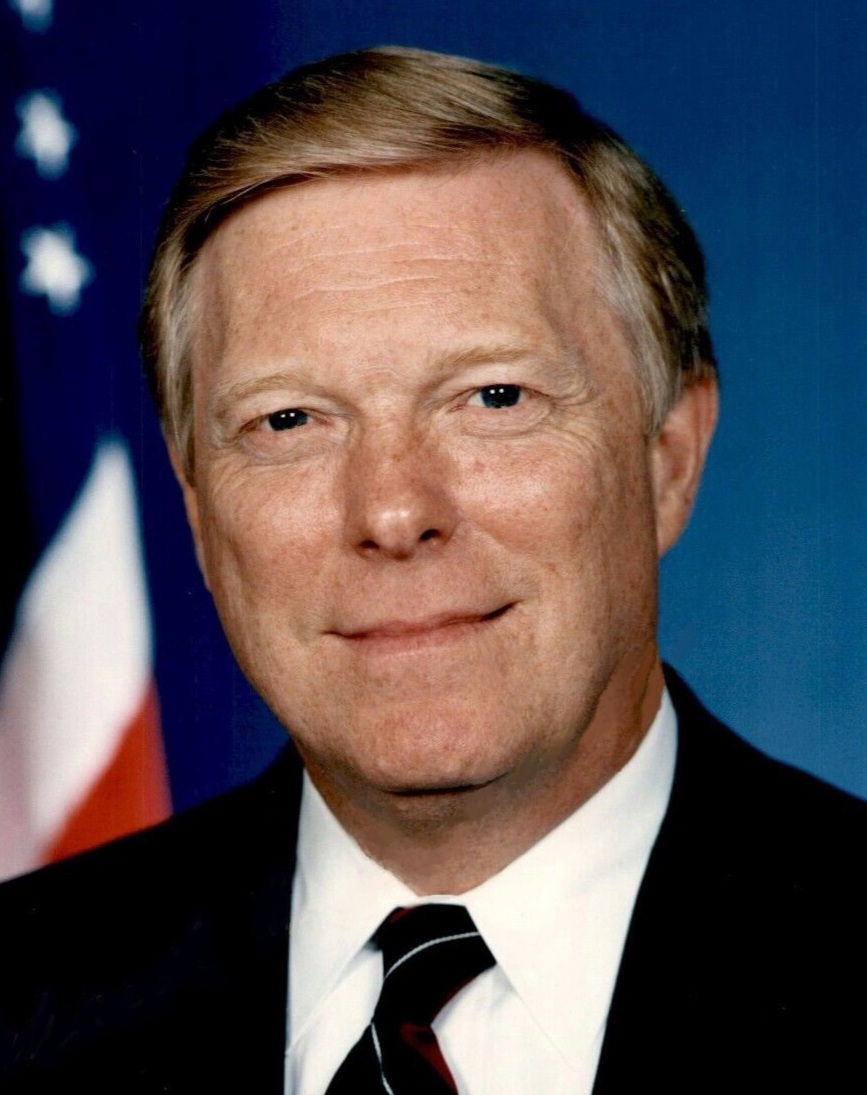
	Majority party	Minority party
Leader	Dennis Hastert	Dick Gephardt (retired as leader)
Party	Republican	Democratic
Leader since	January 3, 1999	January 3, 1995
Leader's seat	Illinois 14th	Missouri 3rd
Last election	221 seats, 47.6%	212 seats, 47.1%
Seats won	229	205
Seat change	▲8	▼7
Popular vote	37,332,552	33,795,885
Percentage	50.0%	45.2%
Swing	▲2.4pp	▼1.9pp
	Third party
Party	Independent
Last election	2 seats
Seats won	1
Seat change	▼1
Popular vote	398,398
Percentage	0.5%
Swing	▼0.2pp
- Results: Democratic hold Democratic gain Republican hold Republican gain Independent hold
Speaker before election
Dennis Hastert
Republican
Elected Speaker
Dennis Hastert
Republican

The 2002 United States House of Representatives elections were held on November 5, 2002, in the middle of President George W. Bush's first term, to elect U.S. Representatives to serve in the 108th United States Congress. This was the first congressional election using districts drawn up during the 2000 United States redistricting cycle on the basis of the 2000 census.

Although it was a midterm election under a Republican president, the Republican Party made a net gain of eight seats, giving the party their largest majority since 1995. Some speculate that this may have been due to increased support for the president's party in the wake of the September 11 attacks.

As of 2026, it is the most recent midterm election in which the president's party won control of the House, as well as gain seats in the House.

== Results ==
=== Federal ===
↓
229	1	205
Republican	I	Democratic

Summary of the November 5, 2002 United States House of Representatives election results

Political Parties	Seats				Popular vote		
Political Parties	2000	2002	Net change	Strength	Vote	%	Change
Republican Party	221	229	▲8	52.6%	37,332,552	50.0%	+2.4%
Democratic Party	212	205	▼7	47.1%	33,795,885	45.2%	-1.9%
Libertarian Party	-	-	-	-	1,050,776	1.4%	-0.2%
Independent	2	1	▼1	0.2%	398,398	0.5%	-0.2%
Green Party	-	-	-	-	297,187	0.4%	+0.1%
Constitution Party	-	-	-	-	129,748	0.2%	+0.1%
Conservative Party	-	-	-	-	48,964	0.1%	-
Others	-	-	-	-	1,653,045	2.2%	+0.4%
Total	435	435	0	100.0%	74,706,555	100.0%	-

Source: Election Statistics - Office of the Clerk

Popular vote
Republican	49.97%
Democratic	45.24%
Libertarian	1.41%
Green	0.40%
Others	2.98%

House seats
Republican	52.64%
Democratic	47.13%
Independent	0.23%

=== Maps ===
Winner's share of the vote

Popular vote by states

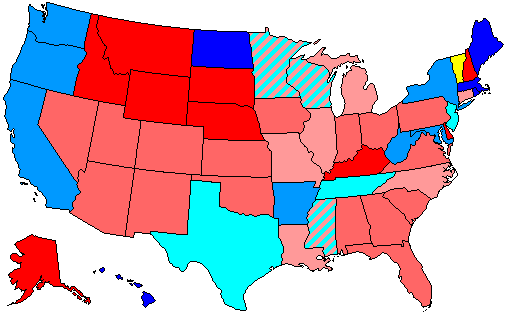
House seats by party holding plurality in state
80+% Democratic
80+% Republican
60+ to 80% Democratic
60+ to 80% Republican
up to 60% Democratic
up to 60% Republican
80+% Independent

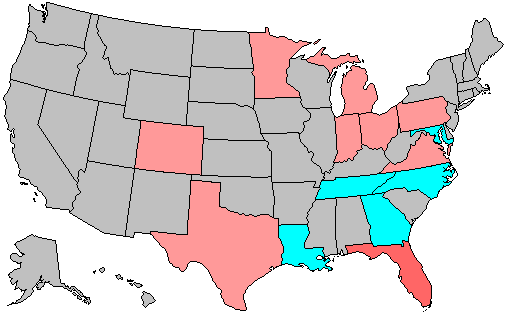
Summary of party change of U.S. House seats in the 2002 House election
6+ Republican gain
6+ Democratic gain
3–5 Republican gain
3–5 Democratic gain
1–2 Republican gain
1–2 Democratic gain
no net change

== Retirements ==
Retiring incumbents by district Democratic incumbent ran Democratic incumbent retired or lost renomination Republican incumbent ran Republican incumbent retired Democratic and Republican incumbent ran Independent incumbent ran Vacant or new district

In the November general elections, 35 incumbents did not seek re-election, either to retire or to seek other positions.

=== Democrats ===
13 Democrats did not seek re-election.

1. Florida 17: Carrie Meek retired.
2. Illinois 5: Rod Blagojevich retired to run for governor of Illinois.
3. Indiana 2: Tim Roemer retired when redistricted from the 3rd district.
4. Maine 2: John Baldacci retired to run for governor of Maine.
5. Michigan 5: James Barcia retired to run for Michigan Senate.
6. Michigan 10: David Bonior retired to run for governor of Michigan.
7. New York 28: John LaFalce retired when redistricted from the 29th district.
8. North Carolina 1: Eva Clayton retired.
9. Pennsylvania 13: Robert Borski retired when redistricted from the 3rd district.
10. Pennsylvania 14: William J. Coyne retired.
11. Tennessee 5: Bob Clement retired to run for U.S. Senate.
12. Texas 25: Ken Bentsen retired to run for U.S. Senate.
13. Wisconsin 4: Tom Barrett retired to run for governor of Wisconsin.

=== Republicans ===
22 Republicans did not seek re-election.

1. Alabama 1: Sonny Callahan retired.
2. Alabama 3: Bob Riley retired to run for governor of Alabama.
3. Arizona 2: Bob Stump retired when redistricted from the 3rd district.
4. California 39: Steve Horn retired when redistricted from the 38th district.
5. Colorado 4: Bob Schaffer retired.
6. Florida 13: Dan Miller retired.
7. Georgia 3: Saxby Chambliss retired to run for U.S. Senate.
8. Iowa 5: Greg Ganske retired to run for U.S. Senate.
9. Louisiana 5: John Cooksey retired to run for U.S. Senate.
10. Maryland 2: Bob Ehrlich retired to run for governor of Maryland.
11. New Hampshire 1: John E. Sununu retired to run for U.S. Senate.
12. New Jersey 5: Marge Roukema retired.
13. New Mexico 2: Joe Skeen retired.
14. New York 19: Benjamin Gilman retired when redistricted from the 20th district.
15. Oklahoma 3: Wes Watkins retired.
16. Oklahoma 4: J. C. Watts retired.
17. South Carolina 3: Lindsey Graham retired to run for U.S. Senate.
18. South Dakota at-large: John Thune retired to run for U.S. Senate.
19. Tennessee 4: Van Hilleary retired to run for governor of Tennessee.
20. Tennessee 7: Ed Bryant retired to run for U.S. Senate.
21. Texas 26: Dick Armey retired.
22. Utah 1: Jim Hansen retired.

== Resignation and expulsion ==
2 seats opened early due to a resignation and an expulsion. Neither were filled until the November elections.

=== Democrats ===
One Democrat resigned and one was expelled.

1. Ohio 3: Tony P. Hall resigned September 9, 2002, to become U.S. Ambassador to the Food and Agriculture Organization, having previously announced his retirement.
2. Ohio 17: James Traficant was expelled July 24, 2002, after being convicted of ten felonies.

=== Republicans ===
No Republicans resigned.

== Incumbents defeated ==
=== In primary elections ===
==== Democrats ====
Six Democrats lost renomination.

1. Alabama 7: Earl Hilliard Sr. lost renomination to Artur Davis, who then won the general election.
2. California 18: Gary Condit lost renomination to Dennis Cardoza, who then won the general election.
3. Georgia 4: Cynthia McKinney lost renomination to Denise Majette, who then won the general election.
4. Michigan 15: Lynn Rivers lost renomination in a redistricting race to John Dingell, who then won the general election.
5. Ohio 17: Tom Sawyer lost renomination to Tim Ryan, who then won the general election.
6. Pennsylvania 12: Frank Mascara lost renomination in a redistricting race to John Murtha, who then won the general election.

==== Republicans ====
Two Republicans lost renomination.

1. Georgia 7: Bob Barr lost renomination in a redistricting race to John Linder, who then won the general election.
2. Indiana 4: Brian Kerns lost renomination in a redistricting race to Steve Buyer, who then won the general election.

=== In the general election ===
==== Democrats ====
Five Democrats lost re-election to Republicans.

1. Connecticut 5: James H. Maloney lost a redistricting race to Nancy Johnson.
2. Florida 5: Karen Thurman lost to Ginny Brown-Waite.
3. Illinois 19: David Phelps lost a redistricting race to John Shimkus.
4. Minnesota 2: Bill Luther lost to John Kline.
5. Mississippi 3: Ronnie Shows lost a redistricting race to Chip Pickering.

==== Republicans ====
Three Republicans lost re-election to Democrats.

1. Maryland 8: Connie Morella lost to Chris Van Hollen.
2. New York 1: Felix Grucci lost to Tim Bishop.
3. Pennsylvania 17: George Gekas lost a redistricting race to Tim Holden.

== Open seats that changed parties ==
=== Democratic seats won by Republicans ===
Three Democratic seats were won by Republicans.

1. Indiana 2: Won by Chris Chocola.
2. Michigan 10: Won by Candice Miller.
3. Ohio 3: Won by Mike Turner.

=== Republican seats won by Democrats ===
Five Republican seats were won by Democrats.

1. California 39: Won by Linda Sánchez.
2. Georgia 3: Won by Jim Marshall.
3. Louisiana 5: Won by Rodney Alexander.
4. Maryland 2: Won by Dutch Ruppersberger.
5. Tennessee 4: Won by Lincoln Davis.

== Open seats that parties held ==
=== Democratic seats held by Democrats ===
Democrats held five of their open seats.

1. Florida 17: Won by Kendrick Meek.
2. Illinois 5: Won by Rahm Emanuel.
3. North Carolina 1: Won by Frank Ballance.
4. Tennessee 5: Won by Jim Cooper.
5. Texas 25: Won by Chris Bell.

=== Republican seats held by Republicans ===
Republicans held fourteen of their open seats.

1. Alabama 1: Won by Jo Bonner.
2. Alabama 3: Won by Mike Rogers.
3. Arizona 2: Won by Trent Franks.
4. Colorado 4: Won by Marilyn Musgrave.
5. Florida 13: Won by Katherine Harris.
6. Iowa 5: Won by Steve King.
7. New Hampshire 1: Won by Jeb Bradley.
8. New Jersey 5: Won by Scott Garrett.
9. New Mexico 2: Won by Steve Pearce.
10. Oklahoma 4: Won by Tom Cole.
11. South Carolina 3: Won by Gresham Barrett.
12. Tennessee 7: Won by Marsha Blackburn.
13. Texas 26: Won by Michael C. Burgess.
14. Utah 1: Won by Rob Bishop.

== Newly created seats ==
Of the 435 districts created in the 2000 redistricting, sixteen had no incumbent representative.

=== Democratic gain ===
Three Democrats were elected in newly created seats.

1. Arizona 7: Won by Raúl Grijalva.
2. Georgia 13: Won by David Scott.
3. North Carolina 13: Won by Brad Miller.

=== Republican gain ===
Thirteen Republicans were elected in newly created seats.

1. Arizona 1: Won by Rick Renzi.
2. California 21: Won by Devin Nunes.
3. Colorado 7: Won by Bob Beauprez.
4. Florida 24: Won by Tom Feeney.
5. Florida 25: Won by Mario Díaz-Balart.
6. Georgia 11: Won by Phil Gingrey.
7. Georgia 12: Won by Max Burns.
8. Michigan 11: Won by Thaddeus McCotter.
9. Nevada 3: Won by Jon Porter.
10. Pennsylvania 6: Won by Jim Gerlach.
11. Pennsylvania 18: Won by Tim Murphy.
12. Texas 5: Won by Jeb Hensarling.
13. Texas 31: Won by John Carter.

== Closest races ==
Thirty-eight races were decided by 10% or lower.

District	Winner	Margin
Colorado 7th	Republican	0.07%
Louisiana 5th	Democratic (flip)	0.56%
Utah 2nd	Democratic	0.74%
Georgia 3rd	Democratic (flip)	1.02%
New York 1st	Democratic (flip)	1.64%
Florida 5th	Republican (flip)	1.66%
Alabama 3rd	Republican	2.11%
Pennsylvania 6th	Republican	2.73%
Pennsylvania 17th	Democratic	2.82%
Kentucky 3rd	Republican	3.22%
Georgia 11th	Republican	3.28%
Kansas 3rd	Democratic	3.29%
Arizona 1st	Republican	3.57%
Kentucky 4th	Democratic	3.57%
Pennsylvania 13th	Democratic	3.61%
Texas 17th	Democratic	3.97%
Maine 2nd	Democratic	4.02%
Maryland 8th	Democratic (flip)	4.22%
Washington 2nd	Democratic	4.30%
Texas 23rd	Republican	4.33%
Texas 11th	Democratic	4.44%
Indiana 2nd	Republican (flip)	4.68%
North Dakota at-large	Democratic	4.82%
Indiana 9th	Democratic	5.02%
Indiana 8th	Republican	5.29%
Tennessee 4th	Democratic (flip)	5.59%
Iowa 2nd	Republican	6.45%
Oklahoma 4th	Republican	7.66%
South Dakota at-large	Republican	7.83% (Note: This seat was the tipping point seat)
California 18th	Democratic	7.89%
Connecticut 2nd	Republican	8.18%
Iowa 3rd	Democratic	8.37%
Maryland 2nd	Democratic (flip)	8.59%
Indiana 7th	Democratic	8.99%
North Carolina 8th	Republican	9.01%
Florida 13th	Republican	9.57%
Illinois 19th	Republican	9.58%
Oregon 5th	Democratic	9.65%

== Special elections ==
Two special elections were held for members to serve the remainder of the term ending January 3, 2003.

District	Incumbent			This race	
District	Member	Party	First elected	Results	Candidates
Oklahoma 1	Steve Largent	Republican	1994 (special)	Incumbent resigned to run for Governor of Oklahoma. New member elected January 8, 2002. Republican hold. Winner was subsequently re-elected in November.	▌ ✓ John Sullivan (Republican) 53.79%; ▌Doug Dodd (Democratic) 44.34%; ▌Neil Mavis (Libertarian) 1.53%; ▌David Fares (Independent) 0.34%
Hawaii 2	Patsy Mink	Democratic	1964; 1976 (retired); 1990 (special)	Incumbent died September 28, 2002, but was posthumously re-elected, see below. New member elected November 30, 2002. Democratic hold. Winner was subsequently re-elected in a special election on January 4, 2003, for the next term.	▌ ✓ Ed Case (Democratic) 51.44%; ▌John F. Mink (Democratic) 36.27%; ▌John Carroll (Republican) 4.22%; ▌Whitney Anderson (Republican) 2.06%

== Alabama ==
District	Incumbent			This race	
District	Member	Party	First elected	Results	Candidates
Alabama 1	Sonny Callahan	Republican	1984	Incumbent retired. Republican hold.	▌ ✓ Jo Bonner (Republican) 60.5%; ▌Judy McCain Belk (Democratic) 37.8%; ▌Dick Coffee (Libertarian) 1.7%
Alabama 2	Terry Everett	Republican	1992	Incumbent re-elected.	▌ ✓ Terry Everett (Republican) 68.8%; ▌Charles Woods (Democratic) 29.5%; ▌Floyd Shackelford (Libertarian) 1.6%
Alabama 3	Bob Riley	Republican	1996	Incumbent retired to run for Governor of Alabama. Republican hold.	▌ ✓ Mike D. Rogers (Republican) 50.3%; ▌Joe Turnham (Democratic) 48.2%; ▌George Crispin (Libertarian) 1.4%
Alabama 4	Robert Aderholt	Republican	1996	Incumbent re-elected.	▌ ✓ Robert Aderholt (Republican) 86.7%; ▌Tony Hughes McLendon (Libertarian) 13.0%
Alabama 5	Bud Cramer	Democratic	1990	Incumbent re-elected.	▌ ✓ Bud Cramer (Democratic) 73.3%; ▌Stephen P. Engel (Republican) 24.7%; ▌Alan F. Barksdale (Libertarian) 1.9%
Alabama 6	Spencer Bachus	Republican	1992	Incumbent re-elected.	▌ ✓ Spencer Bachus (Republican) 89.8%; ▌J. Holden McAllister (Libertarian) 9.9%
Alabama 7	Earl Hilliard Sr.	Democratic	1992	Incumbent lost renomination. Democratic hold.	▌ ✓ Artur Davis (Democratic) 92.4%; ▌Lauren Orth McCay (Libertarian) 7.3%

== Alaska ==
District	Incumbent			This race	
District	Member	Party	First elected	Results	Candidates
Alaska at-large	Don Young	Republican	1973 (special)	Incumbent re-elected.	▌ ✓ Don Young (Republican) 74.51%; ▌Clifford Mark Greene (Democratic) 17.28%; ▌Russell F. DeForest (Green) 6.34%; ▌Rob Clift (Libertarian) 1.67%

== Arizona ==
The state gained two seats in reapportionment.

District	Incumbent			This race	
District	Member	Party	First elected	Results	Candidates
Arizona 1	None (District created)			New district. Republican gain.	▌ ✓ Rick Renzi (Republican) 49.2%; ▌George Cordova (Democratic) 45.6%; ▌Edwin Porr (Libertarian) 5.2%
Arizona 2	Bob Stump; Redistricted from the 3rd district	Republican	1976 (Note: Stump was originally elected as a Democrat. He switched parties in 1982 and was re-elected as such that year.)	Incumbent retired. Republican hold.	▌ ✓ Trent Franks (Republican) 59.9%; ▌Randy Camacho (Democratic) 36.6%; ▌Edward R. Carlson (Libertarian) 3.5%
Arizona 3	John Shadegg; Redistricted from the 4th district	Republican	1994	Incumbent re-elected.	▌ ✓ John Shadegg (Republican) 67.3%; ▌Charles Hill (Democratic) 30.3%; ▌Mark Yannone (Libertarian) 2.4%
Arizona 4	Ed Pastor; Redistricted from the 2nd district	Democratic	1991 (special)	Incumbent re-elected.	▌ ✓ Ed Pastor (Democratic) 67.4%; ▌Jonathan Barnert (Republican) 27.8%; ▌Amy Gibbons (Libertarian) 4.8%
Arizona 5	J. D. Hayworth; Redistricted from the 6th district	Republican	1994	Incumbent re-elected.	▌ ✓ J. D. Hayworth (Republican) 61.2%; ▌Craig Columbus (Democratic) 36.3%; ▌Warren Severin (Libertarian) 2.6%
Arizona 6	Jeff Flake; Redistricted from the 1st district	Republican	2000	Incumbent re-elected.	▌ ✓ Jeff Flake (Republican) 65.9%; ▌Deborah Thomas (Democratic) 31.6%; ▌Andy Wagner (Libertarian) 2.5%
Arizona 7	None (District created)			New district. Democratic gain.	▌ ✓ Raúl Grijalva (Democratic) 59.0%; ▌Ross Hieb (Republican) 37.1%; ▌John Nemeth (Libertarian) 3.9%
Arizona 8	Jim Kolbe; Redistricted from the 5th district	Republican	1984	Incumbent re-elected.	▌ ✓ Jim Kolbe (Republican) 63.3%; ▌Mary Judge Ryan (Democratic) 33.6%; ▌Joe Duarte (Libertarian) 3.1%

== Arkansas ==
District	Incumbent			This race	
District	Member	Party	First elected	Results	Candidates
Arkansas 1	Marion Berry	Democratic	1996	Incumbent re-elected.	▌ ✓ Marion Berry (Democratic) 66.8%; ▌Tommy F. Robinson (Republican) 33.2%
Arkansas 2	Vic Snyder	Democratic	1996	Incumbent re-elected.	▌ ✓ Vic Snyder (Democratic) 92.9%; ▌Ed Garner (Independent) 7.1%
Arkansas 3	John Boozman	Republican	2001	Incumbent re-elected.	▌ ✓ John Boozman (Republican) 98.9%; ▌George Lyne (Independent) 1.1%
Arkansas 4	Mike Ross	Democratic	2000	Incumbent re-elected.	▌ ✓ Mike Ross (Democratic) 60.6%; ▌Jay Dickey (Republican) 39.4%

== California ==
The state gained one seat in reapportionment.

District	Incumbent			This race	
District	Member	Party	First elected	Results	Candidates
California 1	Mike Thompson	Democratic	1998	Incumbent re-elected.	▌ ✓ Mike Thompson (Democratic) 64.07%; ▌Lawrence R. Wiesner (Republican) 32.4%; ▌Kevin Bastian (Libertarian) 3.53%
California 2	Wally Herger	Republican	1988	Incumbent re-elected.	▌ ✓ Wally Herger (Republican) 65.79%; ▌Mike Johnson (Democratic) 29.31%; ▌Patrice Thiessen (Natural Law) 2.72%; ▌Charles R. Martin (Libertarian) 2.19%
California 3	Doug Ose	Republican	1998	Incumbent re-elected.	▌ ✓ Doug Ose (Republican) 62.45%; ▌Howard Beeman (Democratic) 34.44%; ▌Douglas Arthur Tuma (Libertarian) 3.1%
California 4	John Doolittle	Republican	1990	Incumbent re-elected.	▌ ✓ John Doolittle (Republican) 64.77%; ▌Mark Norberg (Democratic) 31.89%; ▌Allen M. Roberts (Libertarian) 3.17%
California 5	Bob Matsui	Democratic	1978	Incumbent re-elected.	▌ ✓ Bob Matsui (Democratic) 71.47%; ▌Richard Frankhuizen (Republican) 26.41%; ▌Timothy Roloff (Libertarian) 3.12%
California 6	Lynn Woolsey	Democratic	1992	Incumbent re-elected.	▌ ✓ Lynn Woolsey (Democratic) 66.69%; ▌Paul L. Erickson (Republican) 29.61%; ▌Richard O. Barton (Libertarian) 2.36%; ▌Jeff Rainforth (Reform) 1.35%
California 7	George Miller	Democratic	1974	Incumbent re-elected.	▌ ✓ George Miller (Democratic) 70.71%; ▌Charles R. Hargrave (Republican) 26.44%; ▌Scott A. Wilson (Libertarian) 2.85%
California 8	Nancy Pelosi	Democratic	1987 (special)	Incumbent re-elected.	▌ ✓ Nancy Pelosi (Democratic) 79.58%; ▌G. Michael German (Republican) 12.5%; ▌Jay Pond (Green) 6.25%; ▌Ira Spivack (Libertarian) 1.66%
California 9	Barbara Lee	Democratic	1998	Incumbent re-elected.	▌ ✓ Barbara Lee (Democratic) 81.41%; ▌Jerald Udinsky (Republican) 15.18%; ▌James Eyer (Libertarian) 3.41%
California 10	Ellen Tauscher	Democratic	1996	Incumbent re-elected.	▌ ✓ Ellen Tauscher (Democratic) 75.59%; ▌Sonia E. Alonso Harden (Libertarian) 24.41%
California 11	Richard Pombo	Republican	1992	Incumbent re-elected.	▌ ✓ Richard Pombo (Republican) 60.31%; ▌Elaine Shaw (Democratic) 39.69%
California 12	Tom Lantos	Democratic	1980	Incumbent re-elected.	▌ ✓ Tom Lantos (Democratic) 68.13%; ▌Michael Moloney (Republican) 24.76%; ▌Maad Abu-Ghazalah (Libertarian) 7.1%
California 13	Pete Stark	Democratic	1972	Incumbent re-elected.	▌ ✓ Pete Stark (Democratic) 71.06%; ▌Syed Mahmood (Republican) 22.06%; ▌Mark Stroberg (Libertarian) 3.04%; ▌Don J. Grundmann (American Independent) 2.28%; ▌John Bambey (Reform) 1.56%
California 14	Anna Eshoo	Democratic	1992	Incumbent re-elected.	▌ ✓ Anna Eshoo (Democratic) 68.18%; ▌Joe Nixon (Republican) 28.16%; ▌Andrew Carver (Libertarian) 3.66%
California 15	Mike Honda	Democratic	2000	Incumbent re-elected.	▌ ✓ Mike Honda (Democratic) 65.77%; ▌Linda Rae Hermann (Republican) 31.01%; ▌Jeff Landauer (Libertarian) 3.22%
California 16	Zoe Lofgren	Democratic	1994	Incumbent re-elected.	▌ ✓ Zoe Lofgren (Democratic) 67.02%; ▌Douglas Adams McNea (Republican) 29.8%; ▌Dennis Michael Umphress (Libertarian) 3.18%
California 17	Sam Farr	Democratic	1993 (special)	Incumbent re-elected.	▌ ✓ Sam Farr (Democratic) 68.07%; ▌Clint Engler (Republican) 27.02%; ▌Ray Glock-Grueneich (Green) 3.27%; ▌Jascha Lee (Libertarian) 1.62%
California 18	Gary Condit	Democratic	1989 (special)	Incumbent lost renomination. Democratic hold.	▌ ✓ Dennis Cardoza (Democratic) 51.26%; ▌Dick Monteith (Republican) 43.37%; ▌Kevin Cripe (American Independent) 3.32%; ▌Linda De Groat (Libertarian) 2%
California 19	George Radanovich	Republican	1994	Incumbent re-elected.	▌ ✓ George Radanovich (Republican) 67.31%; ▌John Veen (Democratic) 30.04%; ▌Patrick Lee McHargue (Libertarian) 1.66%
California 20	Cal Dooley	Democratic	1990	Incumbent re-elected.	▌ ✓ Cal Dooley (Democratic) 63.7%; ▌Andre Minuth (Republican) 34.28%; ▌Varrin Swearingen (Libertarian) 2.03%
California 21	None (District created)			New district. Republican gain.	▌ ✓ Devin Nunes (Republican) 70.49%; ▌David LaPere (Democratic) 26.24%; ▌Jonathan Richter (Libertarian) 3.28%
California 22	Bill Thomas; Redistricted from the 21st district	Republican	1978	Incumbent re-elected.	▌ ✓ Bill Thomas (Republican) 73.33%; ▌Jaime Corvera (Democratic) 23.73%; ▌Frank Coates (Libertarian) 2.94%
California 23	Lois Capps; Redistricted from the 22nd district	Democratic	1998	Incumbent re-elected.	▌ ✓ Lois Capps (Democratic) 59.03%; ▌Beth Rogers (Republican) 38.59%; ▌James Hill (Libertarian) 2.38%
California 24	Elton Gallegly; Redistricted from the 23rd district	Republican	1986	Incumbent re-elected.	▌ ✓ Elton Gallegly (Republican) 65.18%; ▌Fern Rudin (Democratic) 31.76%; ▌Gary Harber (Libertarian) 3.06%
California 25	Buck McKeon	Republican	1992	Incumbent re-elected.	▌ ✓ Buck McKeon (Republican) 64.97%; ▌Robert Conaway (Democratic) 31.1%; ▌Frank Consolo (Libertarian) 3.93%
California 26	David Dreier; Redistricted from the 28th district	Republican	1980	Incumbent re-elected.	▌ ✓ David Dreier (Republican) 63.77%; ▌Marjorie Musser Mikels (Democratic) 33.49%; ▌Randall Weissbuch (Libertarian) 2.73%
California 27	Brad Sherman; Redistricted from the 24th district	Democratic	1996	Incumbent re-elected.	▌ ✓ Brad Sherman (Democratic) 61.96%; ▌Robert Levy (Republican) 38.04%
California 28	Howard Berman; Redistricted from the 26th district	Democratic	1982	Incumbent re-elected.	▌ ✓ Howard Berman (Democratic) 71.4%; ▌David Hernandez Jr. (Republican) 23.16%; ▌Kelley Ross (Libertarian) 5.45%
California 29	Adam Schiff; Redistricted from the 27th district	Democratic	2000	Incumbent re-elected.	▌ ✓ Adam Schiff (Democratic) 62.56%; ▌Jim Scileppi (Republican) 33.42%; ▌Ted Brown (Libertarian) 4.02%
California 30	Henry Waxman; Redistricted from the 29th district	Democratic	1974	Incumbent re-elected.	▌ ✓ Henry Waxman (Democratic) 70.37%; ▌Tony Goss (Republican) 29.63%
California 31	Xavier Becerra; Redistricted from the 30th district	Democratic	1992	Incumbent re-elected.	▌ ✓ Xavier Becerra (Democratic) 81.15%; ▌Luis Vega (Republican) 18.85%
California 32	Hilda Solis; Redistricted from the 31st district	Democratic	2000	Incumbent re-elected.	▌ ✓ Hilda Solis (Democratic) 68.79%; ▌Emma Fischbeck (Republican) 27.46%; ▌Michael McGuire (Libertarian) 3.74%
California 33	Diane Watson; Redistricted from the 32nd district	Democratic	2001 (special)	Incumbent re-elected.	▌ ✓ Diane Watson (Democratic) 82.55%; ▌Andrew Kim (Republican) 14.1%; ▌Charles Tate (Libertarian) 3.35%
California 34	Lucille Roybal-Allard; Redistricted from the 33rd district	Democratic	1992	Incumbent re-elected.	▌ ✓ Lucille Roybal-Allard (Democratic) 74.04%; ▌Wayne Miller (Republican) 25.96%
California 35	Maxine Waters	Democratic	1990	Incumbent re-elected.	▌ ✓ Maxine Waters (Democratic) 77.51%; ▌Ross Moen (Republican) 19.37%; ▌Gordon Michael Mego (AIndependent) 3.12%
California 36	Jane Harman	Democratic	1992; 1998 (retired); 2000	Incumbent re-elected.	▌ ✓ Jane Harman (Democratic) 61.35%; ▌Stuart Johnson (Republican) 35.01%; ▌Mark McSpadden (Libertarian) 3.63%
California 37	Juanita Millender-McDonald	Democratic	1996	Incumbent re-elected.	▌ ✓ Juanita Millender-McDonald (Democratic) 72.92%; ▌Oscar Velasco (Republican) 23.16%; ▌Herb Peters (Libertarian) 3.92%
California 38	Grace Napolitano; Redistricted from the 34th district	Democratic	1998	Incumbent re-elected.	▌ ✓ Grace Napolitano (Democratic) 71.11%; ▌Alex Burrola (Republican) 26.27%; ▌Al Cuperus (Libertarian) 2.61%
California 39	Steve Horn; Redistricted from the 38th district	Republican	1992	Incumbent retired. Democratic gain.	▌ ✓ Linda Sánchez (Democratic) 54.81%; ▌Tim Escobar (Republican) 40.82%; ▌Richard G. Newhouse (Libertarian) 4.37%
California 40	Ed Royce; Redistricted from the 39th district	Republican	1992	Incumbent re-elected.	▌ ✓ Ed Royce (Republican) 67.64%; ▌Christina Avalos (Democratic) 29.47%; ▌Chuck McGlawn (Libertarian) 2.89%
California 41	Jerry Lewis; Redistricted from the 40th district	Republican	1978	Incumbent re-elected.	▌ ✓ Jerry Lewis (Republican) 67.38%; ▌Keith Johnson (Democratic) 29.63%; ▌Kevin Craig (Libertarian) 2.99%
California 42	Gary Miller; Redistricted from the 41st district	Republican	1998	Incumbent re-elected.	▌ ✓ Gary Miller (Republican) 67.8%; ▌Richard Waldron (Democratic) 28.98%; ▌Donald Yee (Libertarian) 3.22%
California 43	Joe Baca; Redistricted from the 42nd district	Democratic	1999 (special)	Incumbent re-elected.	▌ ✓ Joe Baca (Democratic) 66.39%; ▌Wendy Neighbor (Republican) 30.47%; ▌Ethel Mohler (Libertarian) 3.14%
California 44	Ken Calvert; Redistricted from the 43rd district	Republican	1992	Incumbent re-elected.	▌ ✓ Ken Calvert (Republican) 63.66%; ▌Louis Vandenberg (Democratic) 31.56%; ▌Phill Courtney (Green) 4.78%
California 45	Mary Bono; Redistricted from the 44th district	Republican	1998	Incumbent re-elected.	▌ ✓ Mary Bono (Republican) 65.23%; ▌Elle Kurpiewski (Democratic) 32.72%; ▌Rod Miller-Boyer (Libertarian) 2.05%
California 46	Dana Rohrabacher; Redistricted from the 45th district	Republican	1988	Incumbent re-elected.	▌ ✓ Dana Rohrabacher (Republican) 61.73%; ▌Gerrie Schipske (Democratic) 34.54%; ▌Keith Gann (Libertarian) 3.68%
California 47	Loretta Sanchez; Redistricted from the 46th district	Democratic	1996	Incumbent re-elected.	▌ ✓ Loretta Sanchez (Democratic) 60.56%; ▌Jeff Chavez (Republican) 34.69%; ▌Paul Marsden (Libertarian) 4.2%
California 48	Christopher Cox; Redistricted from the 47th district	Republican	1988	Incumbent re-elected.	▌ ✓ Christopher Cox (Republican) 68.44%; ▌John Graham (Democratic) 28.44%; ▌Joe Michael Cobb (Libertarian) 3.12%
California 49	Darrell Issa; Redistricted from the 48th district	Republican	2000	Incumbent re-elected.	▌ ✓ Darrell Issa (Republican) 77.22%; ▌Karl Dietrich (Libertarian) 21.95%
California 50	Duke Cunningham; Redistricted from the 51st district	Republican	1990	Incumbent re-elected.	▌ ✓ Duke Cunningham (Republican) 64.33%; ▌Del Stewart (Democratic) 32.34%; ▌Richard Fontanesi (Libertarian) 3.33%
California 51	Bob Filner; Redistricted from the 50th district	Democratic	1992	Incumbent re-elected.	▌ ✓ Bob Filner (Democratic) 57.93%; ▌Maria Garcia (Republican) 39.33%; ▌Jeffrey Keup (Libertarian) 2.74%
California 52	Duncan L. Hunter	Republican	1980	Incumbent re-elected.	▌ ✓ Duncan L. Hunter (Republican) 70.15%; ▌Peter Moore-Kochlacs (Democratic) 25.75%; ▌Michael Benoit (Libertarian) 4.1%
California 53	Susan Davis; Redistricted from the 49th district	Democratic	2000	Incumbent re-elected.	▌ ✓ Susan Davis (Democratic) 62.19%; ▌Bill VanDeWeghe (Republican) 37.78%

== Colorado ==
The state gained one seat in reapportionment.

District	Incumbent			This race	
District	Member	Party	First elected	Results	Candidates
Colorado 1	Diana DeGette	Democratic	1996	Incumbent re-elected.	▌ ✓ Diana DeGette (Democratic) 66.28%; ▌Ken Chlouber (Republican) 29.59%; ▌Ken Seaman (Green) 1.90%; ▌Kent Leonard (Libertarian) 1.53%
Colorado 2	Mark Udall	Democratic	1998	Incumbent re-elected.	▌ ✓ Mark Udall (Democratic) 60.09%; ▌Sandy Hume (Republican) 36.77%; ▌Norm Olsen (Libertarian) 1.74%
Colorado 3	Scott McInnis	Republican	1992	Incumbent re-elected.	▌ ✓ Scott McInnis (Republican) 65.80%; ▌Dennis Berckefeldt (Democratic) 31.27%; ▌Brent Shroyer (Libertarian) 2.00%
Colorado 4	Bob Schaffer	Republican	1996	Incumbent retired. Republican hold.	▌ ✓ Marilyn Musgrave (Republican) 54.94%; ▌Stan Matsunaka (Democratic) 41.68%; ▌John Volz (Libertarian) 3.38%
Colorado 5	Joel Hefley	Republican	1986	Incumbent re-elected.	▌ ✓ Joel Hefley (Republican) 69.37%; ▌Curtis Imrie (Democratic) 24.68%; ▌Biff Baker (Libertarian) 5.94%
Colorado 6	Tom Tancredo	Republican	1998	Incumbent re-elected.	▌ ✓ Tom Tancredo (Republican) 66.88%; ▌Lance Wright (Democratic) 30.03%; ▌Adam Katz (Libertarian) 3.08%
Colorado 7	None (District created)			New district. Republican gain.	▌ ✓ Bob Beauprez (Republican) 47.31%; ▌Mike Feeley (Democratic) 47.24%; ▌Dave Chandler (Green) 1.89%; ▌Victor Good (Natural Law) 1.81%; ▌Bud Martin (Libertarian) 1.68%

== Connecticut ==
The state lost one seat in reapportionment.

District	Incumbent			This race	
District	Member	Party	First elected	Results	Candidates
Connecticut 1	John B. Larson	Democratic	1998	Incumbent re-elected.	▌ ✓ John B. Larson (Democratic) 66.79%; ▌Phil Steele (Republican) 33.20%
Connecticut 2	Rob Simmons	Republican	2000	Incumbent re-elected.	▌ ✓ Rob Simmons (Republican) 54.09%; ▌Joe Courtney (Democratic) 45.91%
Connecticut 3	Rosa DeLauro	Democratic	1990	Incumbent re-elected.	▌ ✓ Rosa DeLauro (Democratic) 65.58%; ▌Richter Elser (Republican) 29.54%; ▌Charles Pillsbury (Green) 4.88%
Connecticut 4	Chris Shays	Republican	1987 (special)	Incumbent re-elected.	▌ ✓ Chris Shays (Republican) 64.43%; ▌Stephanie Sanchez (Democratic) 35.57%
Connecticut 5	James H. Maloney	Democratic	1996	Incumbent lost re-election. Democratic loss.	▌ ✓ Nancy Johnson (Republican) 54.25%; ▌James H. Maloney (Democratic) 43.26%; ▌Joseph Zdonczyk (Constitution) 1.77%; ▌Walter Gengarelly (Libertarian) 0.72%
Connecticut 5	Nancy Johnson; Redistricted from the 6th district	Republican	1982	Incumbent re-elected.	▌ ✓ Nancy Johnson (Republican) 54.25%; ▌James H. Maloney (Democratic) 43.26%; ▌Joseph Zdonczyk (Constitution) 1.77%; ▌Walter Gengarelly (Libertarian) 0.72%

== Delaware ==
District	Incumbent			This race	
District	Member	Party	First elected	Results	Candidates
Delaware at-large	Mike Castle	Republican	1992	Incumbent re-elected.	▌ ✓ Mike Castle (Republican) 72.07%; ▌Michael Miller (Democratic) 26.71%; ▌Brad C. Thomas (Libertarian) 1.22%

== Florida ==
The state gained two seats in reapportionment.

District	Incumbent			This race	
District	Member	Party	First elected	Results	Candidates
Florida 1	Jeff Miller	Republican	2001 (special)	Incumbent re-elected.	▌ ✓ Jeff Miller (Republican) 74.59%; ▌Bert Oram (Democratic) 25.40%
Florida 2	Allen Boyd	Democratic	1996	Incumbent re-elected.	▌ ✓ Allen Boyd (Democratic) 66.90%; ▌Tom McGurk (Republican) 33.10%
Florida 3	Corrine Brown	Democratic	1992	Incumbent re-elected.	▌ ✓ Corrine Brown (Democratic) 59.29%; ▌Jennifer Carroll (Republican) 40.71%
Florida 4	Ander Crenshaw	Republican	2000	Incumbent re-elected.	▌ ✓ Ander Crenshaw (Republican); Uncontested
Florida 5	Karen Thurman	Democratic	1992	Incumbent lost re-election. Republican gain.	▌ ✓ Ginny Brown-Waite (Republican) 47.90%; ▌Karen Thurman (Democratic) 46.24%; ▌Jack Gargan (Independent) 3.39%; ▌Brian Moore (Independent) 2.44%
Florida 6	Cliff Stearns	Republican	1988	Incumbent re-elected.	▌ ✓ Cliff Stearns (Republican) 65.36%; ▌David Bruderly (Democratic) 34.64%
Florida 7	John Mica	Republican	1992	Incumbent re-elected.	▌ ✓ John Mica (Republican) 59.58%; ▌Wayne Hogan (Democratic) 40.42%
Florida 8	Ric Keller	Republican	2000	Incumbent re-elected.	▌ ✓ Ric Keller (Republican) 65.14%; ▌Eddie Diaz (Democratic) 34.86%
Florida 9	Michael Bilirakis	Republican	1982	Incumbent re-elected.	▌ ✓ Michael Bilirakis (Republican) 71.46%; ▌Chuck Kalogianis (Democratic) 28.53%
Florida 10	Bill Young	Republican	1970	Incumbent re-elected.	▌ ✓ Bill Young (Republican); Uncontested
Florida 11	Jim Davis	Democratic	1996	Incumbent re-elected.	▌ ✓ Jim Davis (Democratic); Uncontested
Florida 12	Adam Putnam	Republican	2000	Incumbent re-elected.	▌ ✓ Adam Putnam (Republican); Uncontested
Florida 13	Dan Miller	Republican	1992	Incumbent retired. Republican hold.	▌ ✓ Katherine Harris (Republican) 54.78%; ▌Jan Schneider (Democratic) 45.21%
Florida 14	Porter Goss	Republican	1988	Incumbent re-elected.	▌ ✓ Porter Goss (Republican); Uncontested
Florida 15	Dave Weldon	Republican	1994	Incumbent re-elected.	▌ ✓ Dave Weldon (Republican) 63.15%; ▌Jim Tso (Democratic) 36.85%
Florida 16	Mark Foley	Republican	1994	Incumbent re-elected.	▌ ✓ Mark Foley (Republican) 78.88%; ▌Jack McLain (Constitution) 21.12%
Florida 17	Carrie Meek	Democratic	1992	Incumbent retired. Democratic hold.	▌ ✓ Kendrick Meek (Democratic); Uncontested
Florida 18	Ileana Ros-Lehtinen	Republican	1989	Incumbent re-elected.	▌ ✓ Ileana Ros-Lehtinen (Republican) 69.11%; ▌Ray Chote (Democratic) 28.61%; ▌Orin Opperman (Independent) 2.29%
Florida 19	Robert Wexler	Democratic	1996	Incumbent re-elected.	▌ ✓ Robert Wexler (Democratic) 72.16%; ▌Jack Merkl (Republican) 27.84%
Florida 20	Peter Deutsch	Democratic	1992	Incumbent re-elected.	▌ ✓ Peter Deutsch (Democratic); Uncontested
Florida 21	Lincoln Díaz-Balart	Republican	1992	Incumbent re-elected.	▌ ✓ Lincoln Díaz-Balart (Republican); Uncontested
Florida 22	Clay Shaw	Republican	1980	Incumbent re-elected.	▌ ✓ Clay Shaw (Republican) 60.77%; ▌Carol Roberts (Democratic) 38.35%; ▌Juan Xuna (Independent) 0.88%
Florida 23	Alcee Hastings	Democratic	1992	Incumbent re-elected.	▌ ✓ Alcee Hastings (Democratic) 77.49%; ▌Charles Laurie (Republican) 22.51%
Florida 24	None (District created)			New district. Republican gain.	▌ ✓ Tom Feeney (Republican) 61.84%; ▌Harry Jacobs (Democratic) 38.16%
Florida 25	None (District created)			New district. Republican gain.	▌ ✓ Mario Díaz-Balart (Republican) 64.65%; ▌Annie Betancourt (Democratic) 35.35%

== Georgia ==
The state gained two seats in reapportionment.

District	Incumbent			This race	
District	Member	Party	First elected	Results	Candidates
Georgia 1	Jack Kingston	Republican	1992	Incumbent re-elected.	▌ ✓ Jack Kingston (Republican) 72.14%; ▌Don Smart (Democratic) 27.86%
Georgia 2	Sanford Bishop	Democratic	1992	Incumbent re-elected.	▌ ✓ Sanford Bishop (Democratic); Uncontested
Georgia 3	Saxby Chambliss; Redistricted from the 8th district	Republican	1994	Incumbent retired to run for U.S. senator. Democratic gain.	▌ ✓ Jim Marshall (Democratic) 50.51%; ▌Calder Clay III (Republican) 49.49%
Georgia 4	Cynthia McKinney	Democratic	1992	Incumbent lost renomination. Democratic hold.	▌ ✓ Denise Majette (Democratic) 77.03%; ▌Cynthia Van Auken (Republican) 22.97%
Georgia 5	John Lewis	Democratic	1986	Incumbent re-elected.	▌ ✓ John Lewis (Democratic); Uncontested
Georgia 6	Johnny Isakson	Republican	1999 (special)	Incumbent re-elected.	▌ ✓ Johnny Isakson (Republican) 79.87%; ▌Jeff Weisberger (Democratic) 20.13%
Georgia 7	Bob Barr	Republican	1994	Incumbent lost renomination. Republican loss.	▌ ✓ John Linder (Republican) 78.92%; ▌Michael Berlon (Democratic) 21.08%
Georgia 7	John Linder; Redistricted from the 11th district	Republican	1992	Incumbent re-elected.	▌ ✓ John Linder (Republican) 78.92%; ▌Michael Berlon (Democratic) 21.08%
Georgia 8	Mac Collins; Redistricted from the 3rd district	Republican	1992	Incumbent re-elected.	▌ ✓ Mac Collins (Republican) 78.33%; ▌Angelos Petrakopoulos (Democratic) 21.67%
Georgia 9	Charlie Norwood; Redistricted from the 10th district	Republican	1994	Incumbent re-elected.	▌ ✓ Charlie Norwood (Republican) 72.84%; ▌Barry Gordon Irwin (Democratic) 27.16%
Georgia 10	Nathan Deal; Redistricted from the 9th district	Republican	1992 (Note: Deal was originally elected as a Democrat. He switched parties in April 1995.)	Incumbent re-elected.	▌ ✓ Nathan Deal (Republican); Uncontested
Georgia 11	None (District created)			New district. Republican gain	▌ ✓ Phil Gingrey (Republican) 51.64%; ▌Roger Kahn (Democratic) 48.36%
Georgia 12	None (District created)			New district. Republican gain.	▌ ✓ Max Burns (Republican) 55.19%; ▌Charles "Champ" Walker (Democratic) 44.81%
Georgia 13	None (District created)			New district. Democratic gain.	▌ ✓ David Scott (Democratic) 59.63%; ▌Clay Cox (Republican) 40.37%

== Hawaii ==
District	Incumbent			This race	
District	Member	Party	First elected	Results	Candidates
Hawaii 1	Neil Abercrombie	Democratic	1986 (special); 1988 (lost renomination); 1990	Incumbent re-elected.	▌ ✓ Neil Abercrombie (Democratic) 72.85%; ▌Mark Terry (Republican) 24.92%; ▌James Bracken (Libertarian) 2.23%
Hawaii 2	Patsy Mink	Democratic	1964; 1976 (retired); 1990 (special)	Incumbent died but was re-elected posthumously.	▌ ✓ Patsy Mink (Democratic) 56.16%; ▌Bob McDermott (Republican) 39.98%; ▌Jeff Mallan (Libertarian) 2.63%; ▌Nicholas Bedworth (Natural Law) 1.23%

== Idaho ==
District	Incumbent			This race	
District	Member	Party	First elected	Results	Candidates
Idaho 1	Butch Otter	Republican	2000	Incumbent re-elected.	▌ ✓ Butch Otter (Republican) 58.57%; ▌Betty Richardson (Democratic) 38.94%; ▌Steve Gothard (Libertarian) 2.49%
Idaho 2	Mike Simpson	Republican	1998	Incumbent re-elected.	▌ ✓ Mike Simpson (Republican) 68.18%; ▌Edward Kinghorn (Democratic) 29.05%; ▌John "Lack" Lewis (Libertarian) 2.77%

== Illinois ==
The state lost one seat in reapportionment.

District	Incumbent			This race	
District	Member	Party	First elected	Results	Candidates
Illinois 1	Bobby Rush	Democratic	1992	Incumbent re-elected.	▌ ✓ Bobby Rush (Democratic) 81.17%; ▌Raymond Wardingley (Republican) 16.21%; ▌Dorothy Tsatsos (Libertarian) 2.62%
Illinois 2	Jesse Jackson Jr.	Democratic	1995 (special)	Incumbent re-elected.	▌ ✓ Jesse Jackson Jr. (Democratic) 82.30%; ▌Doug Nelson (Republican) 17.70%
Illinois 3	Bill Lipinski	Democratic	1982	Incumbent re-elected.	▌ ✓ Bill Lipinski (Democratic); Uncontested
Illinois 4	Luis Gutiérrez	Democratic	1992	Incumbent re-elected.	▌ ✓ Luis Gutiérrez (Democratic) 79.68%; ▌Tony Lopez-Cisneros (Republican) 15.12%; ▌Maggie Kohls (Libertarian) 5.20%
Illinois 5	Rod Blagojevich	Democratic	1996	Incumbent retired to run for Governor of Illinois. Democratic hold.	▌ ✓ Rahm Emanuel (Democratic) 66.81%; ▌Mark Augusti (Republican) 28.86%; ▌Frank Gonzalez (Libertarian) 4.34%
Illinois 6	Henry Hyde	Republican	1974	Incumbent re-elected.	▌ ✓ Henry Hyde (Republican) 65.09%; ▌Tom Berry (Democratic) 34.91%
Illinois 7	Danny K. Davis	Democratic	1996	Incumbent re-elected.	▌ ✓ Danny K. Davis (Democratic) 83.21%; ▌Mark Tunney (Republican) 15.25%; ▌Martin Pankau (Libertarian) 1.53%
Illinois 8	Phil Crane	Republican	1969 (special)	Incumbent re-elected.	▌ ✓ Phil Crane (Republican) 57.42%; ▌Melissa Bean (Democratic) 42.56%
Illinois 9	Jan Schakowsky	Democratic	1998	Incumbent re-elected.	▌ ✓ Jan Schakowsky (Democratic) 70.27%; ▌Nicholas Duric (Republican) 26.83%; ▌Stephanie Sailor (Libertarian) 2.89%
Illinois 10	Mark Kirk	Republican	2000	Incumbent re-elected.	▌ ✓ Mark Kirk (Republican) 68.81%; ▌Hank Perritt (Democratic) 31.19%
Illinois 11	Jerry Weller	Republican	1994	Incumbent re-elected.	▌ ✓ Jerry Weller (Republican) 64.32%; ▌Keith Van Duyne (Democratic) 35.68%
Illinois 12	Jerry Costello	Democratic	1988	Incumbent re-elected.	▌ ✓ Jerry Costello (Democratic) 69.25%; ▌David Sadler (Republican) 30.75%
Illinois 13	Judy Biggert	Republican	1998	Incumbent re-elected.	▌ ✓ Judy Biggert (Republican) 70.26%; ▌Thomas Mason (Democratic) 29.74%
Illinois 14	Dennis Hastert	Republican	1986	Incumbent re-elected.	▌ ✓ Dennis Hastert (Republican) 74.14%; ▌Laurence Quick (Democratic) 25.86%
Illinois 15	Tim Johnson	Republican	2000	Incumbent re-elected.	▌ ✓ Tim Johnson (Republican) 65.2%; ▌Joshua Hartke (Democratic) 31.0%; ▌Carl Estabrook (Green) 3.8%
Illinois 16	Don Manzullo	Republican	1992	Incumbent re-elected.	▌ ✓ Don Manzullo (Republican) 70.61%; ▌John Kutsch (Democratic) 29.39%
Illinois 17	Lane Evans	Democratic	1982	Incumbent re-elected.	▌ ✓ Lane Evans (Democratic) 62.42%; ▌Peter Calderone (Republican) 37.58%
Illinois 18	Ray LaHood	Republican	1994	Incumbent re-elected.	▌ ✓ Ray LaHood (Republican); Uncontested
Illinois 19	David Phelps	Democratic	1998	Incumbent lost re-election. Democratic loss.	▌ ✓ John Shimkus (Republican) 54.79%; ▌David Phelps (Democratic) 45.21%
Illinois 19	John Shimkus; Redistricted from the 20th district	Republican	1996	Incumbent re-elected.	▌ ✓ John Shimkus (Republican) 54.79%; ▌David Phelps (Democratic) 45.21%

== Indiana ==
The state lost one seat in reapportionment.

District	Incumbent			This race	
District	Member	Party	First elected	Results	Candidates
Indiana 1	Pete Visclosky	Democratic	1984	Incumbent re-elected.	▌ ✓ Pete Visclosky (Democratic) 66.94%; ▌Mark Leyva (Republican) 31.02%; ▌Timothy Brennan (Libertarian) 2.04%
Indiana 2	Tim Roemer; Redistricted from the 3rd district	Democratic	1990	Incumbent retired. Republican gain.	▌ ✓ Chris Chocola (Republican) 50.45%; ▌Jill Long Thompson (Democratic) 45.77%; ▌Sharon Metheny (Libertarian) 3.77%
Indiana 3	Mark Souder; Redistricted from the 4th district	Republican	1994	Incumbent re-elected.	▌ ✓ Mark Souder (Republican) 63.14%; ▌Jay Rigdon (Democratic) 34.45%; ▌Mike Donlan (Libertarian) 2.41%
Indiana 4	Steve Buyer; Redistricted from the 5th district	Republican	1992	Incumbent re-elected.	▌ ✓ Steve Buyer (Republican) 71.36%; ▌Bill Abbott (Democratic) 26.15%; ▌Jerry Susong (Libertarian) 2.49%
Indiana 4	Brian Kerns; Redistricted from the 7th district	Republican	2000	Incumbent lost renomination. Republican loss.	▌ ✓ Steve Buyer (Republican) 71.36%; ▌Bill Abbott (Democratic) 26.15%; ▌Jerry Susong (Libertarian) 2.49%
Indiana 5	Dan Burton; Redistricted from the 6th district	Republican	1982	Incumbent re-elected.	▌ ✓ Dan Burton (Republican) 71.97%; ▌Katherine Fox Carr (Democratic) 25.18%; ▌Christopher Adkins (Libertarian) 2.85%
Indiana 6	Mike Pence; Redistricted from the 2nd district	Republican	2000	Incumbent re-elected.	▌ ✓ Mike Pence (Republican) 63.79%; ▌Mel Fox (Democratic) 34.40%; ▌Doris Robertson (Libertarian) 1.80%
Indiana 7	Julia Carson; Redistricted from the 10th district	Democratic	1996	Incumbent re-elected.	▌ ✓ Julia Carson (Democratic) 53.13%; ▌Brose McVey (Republican) 44.14%; ▌Andrew Horning (Libertarian) 2.69%
Indiana 8	John Hostettler	Republican	1994	Incumbent re-elected.	▌ ✓ John Hostettler (Republican) 51.31%; ▌Bryan Hartke (Democratic) 46.02%; ▌Pam Williams (Libertarian) 2.67%
Indiana 9	Baron Hill	Democratic	1998	Incumbent re-elected.	▌ ✓ Baron Hill (Democratic) 51.15%; ▌Mike Sodrel (Republican) 46.13%; ▌Jeff Melton (Green) 1.45%; ▌Al Cox (Libertarian) 1.26%

== Iowa ==
District	Incumbent			This race	
District	Member	Party	First elected	Results	Candidates
Iowa 1	Jim Nussle; Redistricted from the 2nd district	Republican	1990	Incumbent re-elected.	▌ ✓ Jim Nussle (Republican) 57.15%; ▌Ann Hutchinson (Democratic) 42.65%
Iowa 2	Jim Leach; Redistricted from the 1st district	Republican	1976	Incumbent re-elected.	▌ ✓ Jim Leach (Republican) 52.19%; ▌Julie Thomas (Democratic) 45.74%; ▌Kevin Litten (Libertarian) 2.02%
Iowa 3	Leonard Boswell	Democratic	1996	Incumbent re-elected.	▌ ✓ Leonard Boswell (Democratic) 53.41%; ▌Stan Thompson (Republican) 45.04%; ▌Jeffrey Smith (Libertarian) 1.24%
Iowa 4	Tom Latham; Redistricted from the 5th district	Republican	1994	Incumbent re-elected.	▌ ✓ Tom Latham (Republican) 54.76%; ▌John Norris (Democratic) 43.07%; ▌Terry Wilson (Libertarian) 1.40%; ▌Jim Hennager (Libertarian) 0.73%
Iowa 5	Greg Ganske; Redistricted from the 4th district	Republican	1994	Incumbent retired to run for U.S. senator. Republican hold.	▌ ✓ Steve King (Republican) 62.15%; ▌Paul Shomshor (Democratic) 37.78%

== Kansas ==
District	Incumbent			This race	
District	Member	Party	First elected	Results	Candidates
Kansas 1	Jerry Moran	Republican	1996	Incumbent re-elected.	▌ ✓ Jerry Moran (Republican) 91.09%; ▌Jack Warner (Libertarian) 8.91%
Kansas 2	Jim Ryun	Republican	1996	Incumbent re-elected.	▌ ✓ Jim Ryun (Republican) 60.42%; ▌Dan Lykins (Democratic) 37.52%; ▌Art Clack (Libertarian) 2.06%
Kansas 3	Dennis Moore	Democratic	1998	Incumbent re-elected.	▌ ✓ Dennis Moore (Democratic) 50.18%; ▌Adam Taff (Republican) 46.89%; Dawn Bly (Ref.) 2.30%; ▌Douglas Martin (Libertarian) 0.62%
Kansas 4	Todd Tiahrt	Republican	1994	Incumbent re-elected.	▌ ✓ Todd Tiahrt (Republican) 60.58%; ▌Carlos Nolla (Democratic) 37.00%; ▌Maike Warren (Libertarian) 2.42%

== Kentucky ==
District	Incumbent			This race	
District	Member	Party	First elected	Results	Candidates
Kentucky 1	Ed Whitfield	Republican	1994	Incumbent re-elected.	▌ ✓ Ed Whitfield (Republican) 62.25%; ▌Klint Alexander (Democratic) 34.75%
Kentucky 2	Ron Lewis	Republican	1994	Incumbent re-elected.	▌ ✓ Ron Lewis (Republican) 69.64%; ▌David Williams (Democratic) 29.17%; ▌Robert Guy Dyer (Libertarian) 1.18%
Kentucky 3	Anne Northup	Republican	1996	Incumbent re-elected.	▌ ✓ Anne Northup (Republican) 51.61%; ▌Jack Conway (Democratic) 48.39%
Kentucky 4	Ken Lucas	Democratic	1998	Incumbent re-elected.	▌ ✓ Ken Lucas (Democratic) 51.11%; ▌Geoff Davis (Republican) 47.54%; ▌John Grote (Libertarian) 1.34%
Kentucky 5	Hal Rogers	Republican	1980	Incumbent re-elected.	▌ ✓ Hal Rogers (Republican) 78.29%; ▌Sidney Jane Bailey (Democratic) 21.71%
Kentucky 6	Ernie Fletcher	Republican	1998	Incumbent re-elected.	▌ ✓ Ernie Fletcher (Republican) 71.95%; ▌Gatewood Galbraith (Independent) 25.98%; ▌Mark Gailey (Libertarian) 2.06%

== Louisiana ==
District	Incumbent			This race	
District	Member	Party	First elected	Results	Candidates
Louisiana 1	David Vitter	Republican	1999 (special)	Incumbent re-elected.	▌ ✓ David Vitter (Republican) 81.47%; ▌Monica Monica (Republican) 11.22%; ▌Robert Namer (Republican) 4.00%; ▌Ian Hawxhurst (Libertarian) 3.30%
Louisiana 2	William Jefferson	Democratic	1990	Incumbent re-elected.	▌ ✓ William Jefferson (Democratic) 63.53%; ▌Irma Muse Dixon (Democratic) 20.03%; ▌Silky Sullivan (Republican) 10.86%; ▌Clarence "Buddy" Hunt (Democratic) 2.91%; ▌Wayne Clement (Libertarian) 2.67%
Louisiana 3	Billy Tauzin	Republican	1980 (Note: Tauzin was first elected as a Democrat. He switched to the Republican Party in August 1995.)	Incumbent re-elected.	▌ ✓ Billy Tauzin (Republican) 86.68%; ▌William Beier (Libertarian) 8.62%; ▌David Iwancio (Independent) 4.69%
Louisiana 4	Jim McCrery	Republican	1988	Incumbent re-elected.	▌ ✓ Jim McCrery (Republican) 71.61%; ▌John Milkovich (Democratic) 26.45%; ▌Bill Jacobs (Libertarian) 1.94%
Louisiana 5	John Cooksey	Republican	1996	Incumbent retired to run for senator. Democratic gain.	▌ ✓ Rodney Alexander (Democratic) 50.28%; ▌Lee Fletcher (Republican) 49.72%
Louisiana 6	Richard Baker	Republican	1986	Incumbent re-elected.	▌ ✓ Richard Baker (Republican) 84.04%; ▌Rick Moscatello (Libertarian) 15.96%
Louisiana 7	Chris John	Democratic	1996	Incumbent re-elected.	▌ ✓ Chris John (Democratic) 86.82%; ▌Michael Harris (Independent) 13.18%

== Maine ==
District	Incumbent			This race	
District	Member	Party	First elected	Results	Candidates
Maine 1	Tom Allen	Democratic	1996	Incumbent re-elected.	▌ ✓ Tom Allen (Democratic) 63.81%; ▌Steven Joyce (Republican) 36.19%
Maine 2	John Baldacci	Democratic	1994	Incumbent retired to run for Governor of Maine. Democratic hold.	▌ ✓ Mike Michaud (Democratic) 52.01%; ▌Kevin Raye (Republican) 47.99%

== Maryland ==
District	Incumbent			This race	
District	Member	Party	First elected	Results	Candidates
Maryland 1	Wayne Gilchrest	Republican	1990	Incumbent re-elected.	▌ ✓ Wayne Gilchrest (Republican) 76.67%; ▌Ann Tamlyn (Democratic) 23.16%
Maryland 2	Robert Ehrlich	Republican	1994	Incumbent retired to run for Governor of Maryland. Democratic gain.	▌ ✓ Dutch Ruppersberger (Democratic) 54.16%; ▌Helen Delich Bentley (Republican) 45.57%
Maryland 3	Ben Cardin	Democratic	1986	Incumbent re-elected.	▌ ✓ Ben Cardin (Democratic) 65.72%; ▌Scott Conwell (Republican) 34.18%
Maryland 4	Albert Wynn	Democratic	1992	Incumbent re-elected.	▌ ✓ Albert Wynn (Democratic) 78.57%; ▌John Kimble (Republican) 20.82%
Maryland 5	Steny Hoyer	Democratic	1981 (special)	Incumbent re-elected.	▌ ✓ Steny Hoyer (Democratic) 69.27%; ▌Joseph Crawford (Republican) 30.52%
Maryland 6	Roscoe Bartlett	Republican	1992	Incumbent re-elected.	▌ ✓ Roscoe Bartlett (Republican) 66.11%; ▌Donald DeArmon (Democratic) 33.80%
Maryland 7	Elijah Cummings	Democratic	1996	Incumbent re-elected.	▌ ✓ Elijah Cummings (Democratic) 73.53%; ▌Joseph Ward (Republican) 26.38%
Maryland 8	Connie Morella	Republican	1986	Incumbent lost re-election. Democratic gain.	▌ ✓ Chris Van Hollen (Democratic) 51.71%; ▌Connie Morella (Republican) 47.49%; ▌Stephen Bassett (Independent) 0.73%

== Massachusetts ==
District	Incumbent			This race	
District	Member	Party	First elected	Results	Candidates
Massachusetts 1	John Olver	Democratic	1991 (special)	Incumbent re-elected.	▌ ✓ John Olver (Democratic) 67.56%; ▌Matthew Kinnaman (Republican) 32.38%
Massachusetts 2	Richard Neal	Democratic	1988	Incumbent re-elected.	▌ ✓ Richard Neal (Democratic); Uncontested
Massachusetts 3	Jim McGovern	Democratic	1996	Incumbent re-elected.	▌ ✓ Jim McGovern (Democratic); Uncontested
Massachusetts 4	Barney Frank	Democratic	1980	Incumbent re-elected.	▌ ✓ Barney Frank (Democratic); Uncontested
Massachusetts 5	Marty Meehan	Democratic	1992	Incumbent re-elected.	▌ ✓ Marty Meehan (Democratic) 60.15%; ▌Charles McCarthy (Republican) 34.03%; ▌Ilana Freedman (Libertarian) 5.76%
Massachusetts 6	John F. Tierney	Democratic	1996	Incumbent re-elected.	▌ ✓ John F. Tierney (Democratic) 68.27%; ▌Mark C. Smith (Republican) 31.63%
Massachusetts 7	Ed Markey	Democratic	1976	Incumbent re-elected.	▌ ✓ Ed Markey (Democratic); Uncontested
Massachusetts 8	Mike Capuano	Democratic	1998	Incumbent re-elected.	▌ ✓ Mike Capuano (Democratic); Uncontested
Massachusetts 9	Stephen Lynch	Democratic	2001 (special)	Incumbent re-elected.	▌ ✓ Stephen Lynch (Democratic); Uncontested
Massachusetts 10	Bill Delahunt	Democratic	1996	Incumbent re-elected.	▌ ✓ Bill Delahunt (Democratic) 69.20%; ▌Luis Gonzaga (Republican) 30.74%

== Michigan ==
The state lost one seat in reapportionment.

District	Incumbent			This race	
District	Member	Party	First elected	Results	Candidates
Michigan 1	Bart Stupak	Democratic	1992	Incumbent re-elected.	▌ ✓ Bart Stupak (Democratic) 67.67%; ▌Don Hooper (Republican) 31.10%; ▌John W. Loosemore (Libertarian) 1.23%
Michigan 2	Pete Hoekstra	Republican	1992	Incumbent re-elected.	▌ ✓ Pete Hoekstra (Republican) 70.40%; ▌Jeffrey Wrisley (Democratic) 27.70%; ▌Laurie Aleck (Libertarian) 1.20%
Michigan 3	Vern Ehlers	Republican	1993 (special)	Incumbent re-elected.	▌ ✓ Vern Ehlers (Republican) 69.97%; ▌Kathryn Lynnes (Democratic) 28.32%; ▌Tom Quinn (Libertarian) 1.19%; ▌Richard Lucey (Reform) 0.51%
Michigan 4	Dave Camp	Republican	1990	Incumbent re-elected.	▌ ✓ Dave Camp (Republican) 68.21%; ▌Lawrence Hollenbeck (Democratic) 30.17%; ▌Sterling Johnson (Green) 1.03%; ▌Albert Chia Jr. (Libertarian) 0.58%
Michigan 5	James Barcia	Democratic	1992	Incumbent retired to run for state senator. Democratic loss.	▌ ✓ Dale Kildee (Democratic) 91.56%; ▌Clint Foster (Libertarian) 5.39%; ▌Harley Mikkelson (Green) 2.99%
Michigan 5	Dale Kildee; Redistricted from the 9th district	Democratic	1976	Incumbent re-elected.	▌ ✓ Dale Kildee (Democratic) 91.56%; ▌Clint Foster (Libertarian) 5.39%; ▌Harley Mikkelson (Green) 2.99%
Michigan 6	Fred Upton	Republican	1986	Incumbent re-elected.	▌ ✓ Fred Upton (Republican) 69.17%; ▌Gary Giguere Jr. (Democratic) 29.31%; ▌Harley Mikkelson (Reform) 1.52%
Michigan 7	Nick Smith	Republican	1992	Incumbent re-elected.	▌ ✓ Nick Smith (Republican) 59.66%; ▌Mike Simpson (Democratic) 38.61%; ▌Kenneth L. Proctor (Libertarian) 1.73%
Michigan 8	Mike Rogers	Republican	2000	Incumbent re-elected.	▌ ✓ Mike Rogers (Republican) 67.88%; ▌Frank D. McAlpine (Democratic) 30.75%; ▌Thomas Yeutter (Libertarian) 1.37%
Michigan 9	Joe Knollenberg; Redistricted from the 11th district	Republican	1992	Incumbent re-elected.	▌ ✓ Joe Knollenberg (Republican) 58.10%; ▌David Fink (Democratic) 39.88%; ▌Robert W. Schubring (Libertarian) 2.03%
Michigan 10	None (District created)			New district. Republican gain.	▌ ✓ Candice Miller (Republican) 63.31%; ▌Carl Marlinga (Democratic) 35.52%; ▌Renae Coon (Democratic) 1.17%
Michigan 11	None (District created)			New district. Republican gain.	▌ ✓ Thaddeus McCotter (Republican) 57.19%; ▌Kevin Kelley (Democratic) 39.66%; ▌William Boyd (Green) 1.93%; ▌Dan Malone (US Taxpayers) 1.23%
Michigan 12	David Bonior; Redistricted from the 10th district	Democratic	1992	Incumbent retired to run for run for Governor of Michigan. Democratic loss.	▌ ✓ Sander Levin (Democratic) 68.26%; ▌Harvey Dean (Republican) 29.78%; ▌Dick Gach (Libertarian) 1.30%; ▌Steven Revis (US Taxpayers) 0.66%
Michigan 12	Sander Levin	Democratic	1982	Incumbent re-elected.	▌ ✓ Sander Levin (Democratic) 68.26%; ▌Harvey Dean (Republican) 29.78%; ▌Dick Gach (Libertarian) 1.30%; ▌Steven Revis (US Taxpayers) 0.66%
Michigan 13	Carolyn Cheeks Kilpatrick; Redistricted from the 15th district	Democratic	1996	Incumbent re-elected.	▌ ✓ Carolyn Cheeks Kilpatrick (Democratic) 91.61%; ▌Raymond Warner (Republican) 8.39%
Michigan 14	John Conyers	Democratic	1964	Incumbent re-elected.	▌ ✓ John Conyers (Democratic) 83.21%; ▌Dave Stone (Republican) 15.20%; ▌Francis Schorr (Libertarian) 0.88%; ▌John D. Litle (Green) 0.71%
Michigan 15	John Dingell; Redistricted from the 16th district	Democratic	1955 (special)	Incumbent re-elected.	▌ ✓ John Dingell (Democratic) 72.21%; ▌Martin Kaltenbach (Republican) 25.72%; ▌Gregory Scott Stempfle (Libertarian) 2.07%
Michigan 15	Lynn Rivers; Redistricted from the 13th district	Democratic	1994	Incumbent lost renomination. Democratic loss.	▌ ✓ John Dingell (Democratic) 72.21%; ▌Martin Kaltenbach (Republican) 25.72%; ▌Gregory Scott Stempfle (Libertarian) 2.07%

== Minnesota ==
District	Incumbent			This race	
District	Member	Party	First elected	Results	Candidates
Minnesota 1	Gil Gutknecht	Republican	1994	Incumbent re-elected.	▌ ✓ Gil Gutknecht (Republican) 61.50%; ▌Steve Andreasen (DFL) 34.65%; ▌Greg Mikkelson (Green) 3.75%
Minnesota 2	Bill Luther; Redistricted from the 6th district	DFL	1994	Incumbent lost re-election. Republican gain.	▌ ✓ John Kline (Republican) 53.33%; ▌Bill Luther (DFL) 42.22%; ▌Greg Mikkelson (No New Taxes) 4.33%
Minnesota 3	Jim Ramstad	Republican	1990	Incumbent re-elected.	▌ ✓ Jim Ramstad (Republican) 72.02%; ▌Darryl Stanton (DFL) 27.88%
Minnesota 4	Betty McCollum	DFL	2000	Incumbent re-elected.	▌ ✓ Betty McCollum (DFL) 62.22%; ▌Clyde Billington (Republican) 33.91%; ▌Scott Raskiewicz (Green) 3.75%
Minnesota 5	Martin Olav Sabo	DFL	1978	Incumbent re-elected.	▌ ✓ Martin Olav Sabo (DFL) 67.03%; ▌Daniel Mathias (Republican) 25.89%; ▌Tim Davis (Green) 6.96%
Minnesota 6	Mark Kennedy; Redistricted from the 2nd district	Republican	2000	Incumbent re-elected.	▌ ✓ Mark Kennedy (Republican) 57.34%; ▌Janet Robert (DFL) 35.06%; ▌Dan Becker (Independence) 7.48%
Minnesota 7	Collin Peterson	DFL	1990	Incumbent re-elected.	▌ ✓ Collin Peterson (DFL) 65.27%; ▌Dan Stevens (Republican) 34.64%
Minnesota 8	Jim Oberstar	DFL	1974	Incumbent re-elected.	▌ ✓ Jim Oberstar (DFL) 68.65%; ▌Bob Lemen (Republican) 31.23%

== Mississippi ==
The state lost one seat in reapportionment.

District	Incumbent			This race	
District	Member	Party	First elected	Results	Candidates
Mississippi 1	Roger Wicker	Republican	1994	Incumbent re-elected.	▌ ✓ Roger Wicker (Republican) 71.43%; ▌Rex Weathers (Democratic) 24.20%; ▌Brenda Blackburn (Reform) 2.60%; ▌Harold Taylor (Libertarian) 1.77%
Mississippi 2	Bennie Thompson	Democratic	1993 (special)	Incumbent re-elected.	▌ ✓ Bennie Thompson (Democratic) 55.14%; ▌Clinton LeSueur (Republican) 42.75%; ▌Lee Dilworth (Reform) 2.10%
Mississippi 3	Chip Pickering	Republican	1996	Incumbent re-elected.	▌ ✓ Chip Pickering (Republican) 63.76%; ▌Ronnie Shows (Democratic) 34.76%; ▌Jim Giles (Independent) 0.65%; ▌Harvey Darden (Independent) 0.43%; ▌Brad McDonald (Libertarian) 0.35%; ▌Carroll Grantham (Reform) 0.23%
Mississippi 3	Ronnie Shows; Redistricted from the 4th district	Democratic	1998	Incumbent lost re-election. Democratic loss.	▌ ✓ Chip Pickering (Republican) 63.76%; ▌Ronnie Shows (Democratic) 34.76%; ▌Jim Giles (Independent) 0.65%; ▌Harvey Darden (Independent) 0.43%; ▌Brad McDonald (Libertarian) 0.35%; ▌Carroll Grantham (Reform) 0.23%
Mississippi 4	Gene Taylor; Redistricted from the 5th district	Democratic	1989 (special)	Incumbent re-elected.	▌ ✓ Gene Taylor (Democratic) 75.21%; ▌Karl Mertz (Republican) 21.24%; ▌Wayne Parker (Libertarian) 2.05%; ▌Thomas Huffmaster (Reform) 1.51%

== Missouri ==
District	Incumbent			This race	
District	Member	Party	First elected	Results	Candidates
Missouri 1	Lacy Clay	Democratic	2000	Incumbent re-elected.	▌ ✓ Lacy Clay (Democratic) 70.11%; ▌Richard Schwadron (Republican) 27.09%; ▌Jim Higgins (Libertarian) 2.80%
Missouri 2	Todd Akin	Republican	2000	Incumbent re-elected.	▌ ✓ Todd Akin (Republican) 67.14%; ▌John Hogan (Democratic) 31.03%; ▌Darla Maloney (Libertarian) 1.83%
Missouri 3	Dick Gephardt	Democratic	1976	Incumbent re-elected.	▌ ✓ Dick Gephardt (Democratic) 59.06%; ▌Catherine Enz (Republican) 38.94%; ▌Dan Byington (Libertarian) 2.00%
Missouri 4	Ike Skelton	Democratic	1976	Incumbent re-elected.	▌ ✓ Ike Skelton (Democratic) 67.64%; ▌Jim Noland (Republican) 30.66%; ▌Daniel Roy Nelson (Libertarian) 1.70%
Missouri 5	Karen McCarthy	Democratic	1994	Incumbent re-elected.	▌ ✓ Karen McCarthy (Democratic) 65.88%; ▌Steve Gordon (Republican) 32.36%; ▌Jeanne Bojarski (Libertarian) 1.76%
Missouri 6	Sam Graves	Republican	2000	Incumbent re-elected.	▌ ✓ Sam Graves (Republican) 63.03%; ▌Cathy Rinehart (Democratic) 35.18%; ▌Erik Buck (Libertarian) 1.79%
Missouri 7	Roy Blunt	Republican	1996	Incumbent re-elected.	▌ ✓ Roy Blunt (Republican) 74.81%; ▌Ron Lapham (Democratic) 23.00%; ▌Doug Burlison (Libertarian) 2.19%
Missouri 8	Jo Ann Emerson	Republican	1996	Incumbent re-elected.	▌ ✓ Jo Ann Emerson (Republican) 71.76%; ▌Gene Curtis (Democratic) 26.91%; ▌Eric Van Oostrom (Libertarian) 1.32%
Missouri 9	Kenny Hulshof	Republican	1996	Incumbent re-elected.	▌ ✓ Kenny Hulshof (Republican) 68.20%; ▌Don Deichman (Democratic) 28.55%; ▌Keith Brekhus (Green) 1.99%; ▌John Mruzik (Libertarian) 1.26%

== Montana ==
District	Incumbent			This race	
District	Member	Party	First elected	Results	Candidates
Montana at-large	Denny Rehberg	Republican	2000	Incumbent re-elected.	▌ ✓ Denny Rehberg (Republican) 64.62%; ▌Steve Kelly (Democratic) 32.67%; ▌Mike Fellows (Libertarian) 2.71%

== Nebraska ==
District	Incumbent			This race	
District	Member	Party	First elected	Results	Candidates
Nebraska 1	Doug Bereuter	Republican	1978	Incumbent re-elected.	▌ ✓ Doug Bereuter (Republican) 85.35%; ▌Robert Eckerson (Libertarian) 14.65%
Nebraska 2	Lee Terry	Republican	1998	Incumbent re-elected.	▌ ✓ Lee Terry (Republican) 63.32%; ▌Jim Simon (Democratic) 32.98%; ▌Doug Paterson (Green) 2.28%; ▌Dave Stock (Libertarian) 1.42%
Nebraska 3	Tom Osborne	Republican	2000	Incumbent re-elected.	▌ ✓ Tom Osborne (Republican) 93.17%; ▌Jerry Hickman (Libertarian) 6.83%

== Nevada ==
District	Incumbent			This race	
District	Member	Party	First elected	Results	Candidates
Nevada 1	Shelley Berkley	Democratic	1998	Incumbent re-elected.	▌ ✓ Shelley Berkley (Democratic) 53.72%; ▌Lynette Boggs-McDonald (Republican) 42.73%; ▌Steven Dempsey (Independent American) 2.39%; ▌W. Lane Startin (Green) 1.16%
Nevada 2	Jim Gibbons	Republican	1996	Incumbent re-elected.	▌ ✓ Jim Gibbons (Republican) 74.3%; ▌Travis Souza (Democratic) 19.97%; ▌Janine Hansen (Independent American) 3.60%; ▌Brendan Trainor (Libertarian) 1.70%; ▌Robert Winquist (Natural Law) 0.39%
Nevada 3	None (District created)			New district. Republican gain.	▌ ✓ Jon Porter (Republican) 56.08%; ▌Dario Herrera (Democratic) 37.24%; ▌Pete O'Neil (Independent) 3.82%; ▌Neil Scott (Libertarian) 1.91%; ▌Dick O'Dell (Independent American) 0.95%

== New Hampshire ==
District	Incumbent			This race	
District	Member	Party	First elected	Results	Candidates
New Hampshire 1	John E. Sununu	Republican	1996	Incumbent retired to run for U.S. senator. Republican hold.	▌ ✓ Jeb Bradley (Republican) 58.11%; ▌Martha Fuller Clark (Democratic) 38.48%; ▌Dan Belforti (Libertarian) 3.33%
New Hampshire 2	Charlie Bass	Republican	1994	Incumbent re-elected.	▌ ✓ Charlie Bass (Republican) 56.81%; ▌Katrina Swett (Democratic) 40.86%; ▌Rosalie Babiarz (Libertarian) 2.28%

== New Jersey ==
District	Incumbent			This race	
District	Member	Party	First elected	Results	Candidates
New Jersey 1	Rob Andrews	Democratic	1990	Incumbent re-elected.	▌ ✓ Rob Andrews (Democratic) 92.74%; ▌Timothy Haas (Libertarian) 7.26%
New Jersey 2	Frank LoBiondo	Republican	1994	Incumbent re-elected.	▌ ✓ Frank LoBiondo (Republican) 69.21%; ▌Steven Farkas (Democratic) 28.28%; ▌Roger Merle (Green) 1.03%; ▌Michael J. Matthews (Libertarian) 1.02%; ▌Constantino Rozzo (Socialist) 0.46%
New Jersey 3	Jim Saxton	Republican	1984	Incumbent re-elected.	▌ ✓ Jim Saxton (Republican) 65.02%; ▌Richard Strada (Democratic) 33.92%; ▌Raymond Byrne (Libertarian) 0.70%; ▌Ken Feduniewicz (America First) 0.35%
New Jersey 4	Chris Smith	Republican	1980	Incumbent re-elected.	▌ ✓ Chris Smith (Republican) 66.15%; ▌Mary Brennan (Democratic) 32.11%; ▌Keith Quarles (Libertarian) 0.69%; ▌Hermann Winkelmann (Independent) 0.61%; ▌Don Graham (Conservative) 0.44%
New Jersey 5	Marge Roukema	Republican	1980	Incumbent retired. Republican hold.	▌ ✓ Scott Garrett (Republican) 59.48%; ▌Anne Sumers (Democratic) 38.28%; ▌Michael Cino (Independent) 2.23%
New Jersey 6	Frank Pallone	Democratic	1988	Incumbent re-elected.	▌ ✓ Frank Pallone (Democratic) 66.46%; ▌Ric Medrow (Republican) 30.89%; ▌Richard Strong (Green) 1.32%; ▌Barry Allen (Libertarian) 0.88%; ▌Mac Dara F. X. Lyden (Independent) 0.45%
New Jersey 7	Mike Ferguson	Republican	2000	Incumbent re-elected.	▌ ✓ Mike Ferguson (Republican) 57.95%; ▌Tim Carden (Democratic) 40.92%; ▌Darren Young (Libertarian) 1.13%
New Jersey 8	Bill Pascrell	Democratic	1996	Incumbent re-elected.	▌ ✓ Bill Pascrell (Democratic) 66.83%; ▌Jared Silverman (Republican) 30.59%; ▌Joseph Fortunato (Green) 2.58%
New Jersey 9	Steve Rothman	Democratic	1996	Incumbent re-elected.	▌ ✓ Steve Rothman (Democratic) 69.76%; ▌Joseph Glass (Republican) 30.24%
New Jersey 10	Donald M. Payne	Democratic	1988	Incumbent re-elected.	▌ ✓ Donald M. Payne (Democratic) 84.45%; ▌Andrew Wirtz (Republican) 15.55%
New Jersey 11	Rodney Frelinghuysen	Republican	1994	Incumbent re-elected.	▌ ✓ Rodney Frelinghuysen (Republican) 72.38%; ▌Vij Pawar (Democratic) 26.39%; ▌Richard S. Roth (Libertarian) 1.23%
New Jersey 12	Rush Holt Jr.	Democratic	1998	Incumbent re-elected.	▌ ✓ Rush Holt Jr. (Democratic) 61.04%; ▌DeForest Soaries (Republican) 36.65%; ▌Carl Mayer (Green) 1.09%; ▌Thomas Abrams (Libertarian) 0.73%; ▌Karen Anne Zaletel (Conservative) 0.49%
New Jersey 13	Bob Menendez	Democratic	1992	Incumbent re-elected.	▌ ✓ Bob Menendez (Democratic) 78.30%; ▌James Geron (Republican) 18.17%; ▌Pat Henry Faulkner (Green) 1.29%; ▌Esmat Zaklama (Independent) 0.83%; ▌Dick Hester (Independent) 0.79%; ▌Herbert H. Shaw (Independent) 0.62%

== New Mexico ==
District	Incumbent			This race	
District	Member	Party	First elected	Results	Candidates
New Mexico 1	Heather Wilson	Republican	1998	Incumbent re-elected.	▌ ✓ Heather Wilson (Republican) 55.34%; ▌Richard M. Romero (Democratic) 44.66%
New Mexico 2	Joe Skeen	Republican	1980	Incumbent retired. Republican hold.	▌ ✓ Steve Pearce (Republican) 56.23%; ▌John Arthur Smith (Democratic) 43.72%
New Mexico 3	Tom Udall	Democratic	1998	Incumbent re-elected.	▌ ✓ Tom Udall (Democratic); Uncontested

== New York ==
The state lost two seats in reapportionment.

District	Incumbent			This race	
District	Member	Party	First elected	Results	Candidates
New York 1	Felix Grucci	Republican	2000	Incumbent lost re-election. Democratic gain.	▌ ✓ Tim Bishop (Democratic) 50.23%; ▌Felix Grucci (Republican) 48.59%; ▌Lorna Salzman (Green) 1.19%
New York 2	Steve Israel	Democratic	2000	Incumbent re-elected.	▌ ✓ Steve Israel (Democratic) 58.48%; ▌Joseph Finley (Republican) 40.46%; ▌John Keenan (Green) 1.07%
New York 3	Peter King	Republican	1992	Incumbent re-elected.	▌ ✓ Peter King (Republican) 71.88%; ▌Stuart Finz (Democratic) 27.22%; ▌Janeen DePrima (Liberal) 0.89%
New York 4	Carolyn McCarthy	Democratic	1996	Incumbent re-elected.	▌ ✓ Carolyn McCarthy (Democratic) 56.25%; ▌Marilyn F. O'Grady (Republican) 43.24%; ▌Tim Derham (Green) 0.51%
New York 5	Gary Ackerman	Democratic	1983 (special)	Incumbent re-elected.	▌ ✓ Gary Ackerman (Democratic) 92.3%; ▌Perry Reich (Conservative) 7.68%
New York 6	Gregory Meeks	Democratic	1998	Incumbent re-elected.	▌ ✓ Gregory Meeks (Democratic) 96.51%; ▌Rey Clarke (Independence) 3.49%
New York 7	Joseph Crowley	Democratic	1998	Incumbent re-elected.	▌ ✓ Joseph Crowley (Democratic) 73.29%; ▌Kevin Brawley (Republican) 26.71%
New York 8	Jerry Nadler	Democratic	1992	Incumbent re-elected.	▌ ✓ Jerry Nadler (Democratic) 76.07%; ▌Jim Farrin (Republican) 18.48%; ▌Alan Jay Gerber (Conservative) 3.16%; ▌Dan Wentzel (Green) 1.80%; ▌Joseph Dobrian (Libertarian) 0.49%
New York 9	Anthony Weiner	Democratic	1998	Incumbent re-elected.	▌ ✓ Anthony Weiner (Democratic) 65.71%; ▌Alfred F. Donohue Jr. (Republican) 34.29%
New York 10	Edolphus Towns	Democratic	1982	Incumbent re-elected.	▌ ✓ Edolphus Towns (Democratic) 97.83%; ▌Herbert F. Ryan (Republican) 2.17%
New York 11	Major Owens	Democratic	1982	Incumbent re-elected.	▌ ✓ Major Owens (Democratic) 86.56%; ▌Susan Cleary (Republican) 12.55%; ▌Alice Gaffney (Conservative) 0.90%
New York 12	Nydia Velázquez	Democratic	1992	Incumbent re-elected.	▌ ✓ Nydia Velázquez (Democratic) 95.81%; ▌Cesar Estevez (Republican) 4.19%
New York 13	Vito Fossella	Republican	1997 (special)	Incumbent re-elected.	▌ ✓ Vito Fossella (Republican) 69.63%; ▌Arne Mattsson (Democratic) 28.32%; ▌Anita Lerman (Independence) 1.38%; ▌Henry Bardel (Green) 0.67%
New York 14	Carolyn Maloney	Democratic	1992	Incumbent re-elected.	▌ ✓ Carolyn Maloney (Democratic) 75.25%; ▌Anton Srdanovic (Republican) 24.75%
New York 15	Charles Rangel	Democratic	1970	Incumbent re-elected.	▌ ✓ Charles Rangel (Democratic) 88.46%; ▌Jessie A. Fields (Republican) 11.54%
New York 16	José E. Serrano	Democratic	1990	Incumbent re-elected.	▌ ✓ José E. Serrano (Democratic) 92.07%; ▌Frank Della Valle (Republican) 7.93%
New York 17	Eliot Engel	Democratic	1988	Incumbent re-elected.	▌ ✓ Eliot Engel (Democratic) 62.61%; ▌Scott Vanderhoef (Republican) 34.43%; ▌Arthur Gallagher (Right to Life) 1%; ▌Elizabeth Shanklin (Green) 1.41%
New York 18	Nita Lowey	Democratic	1988	Incumbent re-elected.	▌ ✓ Nita Lowey (Democratic) 92.04%; ▌Michael J. Reynolds (Right to Life) 7.96%
New York 19	Sue Kelly	Republican	1994	Incumbent re-elected.	▌ ✓ Sue Kelly (Republican) 69.97%; ▌Janine Selendy (Democratic) 25.98%; ▌Christine Tighe (Right to Life) 2.53%; ▌Jonathan Wright (Green) 1.53%
New York 19	Benjamin Gilman; Redistricted from the 20th district	Republican	1972	Incumbent retired. Republican loss.	▌ ✓ Sue Kelly (Republican) 69.97%; ▌Janine Selendy (Democratic) 25.98%; ▌Christine Tighe (Right to Life) 2.53%; ▌Jonathan Wright (Green) 1.53%
New York 20	John E. Sweeney; Redistricted from the 22nd district	Republican	1998	Incumbent re-elected.	▌ ✓ John E. Sweeney (Republican) 73.32%; ▌Frank Stoppenbach (Democratic) 23.98%; ▌Margaret Lewis (Green) 2.70%
New York 21	Michael McNulty	Democratic	1988	Incumbent re-elected.	▌ ✓ Michael McNulty (Democratic) 75.09%; ▌Charles Rosenstein (Republican) 24.91%
New York 22	Maurice Hinchey; Redistricted from the 26th district	Democratic	1992	Incumbent re-elected.	▌ ✓ Maurice Hinchey (Democratic) 64.19%; ▌Eric Hall (Republican) 32.87%; ▌Steven Greenfield (Green) 1.54%; ▌Paul Laux (Right to Life) 1.40%
New York 23	John M. McHugh; Redistricted from the 24th district	Republican	1992	Incumbent re-elected.	▌ ✓ John M. McHugh (Republican); Uncontested
New York 24	Sherwood Boehlert; Redistricted from the 23rd district	Republican	1982	Incumbent re-elected.	▌ ✓ Sherwood Boehlert (Republican) 70.70%; ▌David L. Walrath (Conservative) 21.59%; ▌Mark Dunau (Green) 4.36%; ▌Kathleen Peters (Right to Life) 3.34%
New York 25	James T. Walsh	Republican	1988	Incumbent re-elected.	▌ ✓ James T. Walsh (Republican) 72.29%; ▌Stephanie Aldersley (Democratic) 26.64%; ▌Francis Gavin (Green) 1.07%
New York 26	Thomas M. Reynolds; Redistricted from the 27th district	Republican	1998	Incumbent re-elected.	▌ ✓ Thomas M. Reynolds (Republican) 73.63%; ▌Ayesha Nariman (Democratic) 22.42%; ▌Shawn Harris (Right to Life) 2.23%; ▌Paul Fallon (Green) 1.71%
New York 27	Jack Quinn; Redistricted from the 30th district	Republican	1992	Incumbent re-elected.	▌ ✓ Jack Quinn (Republican) 69.06%; ▌Peter Crotty (Democratic) 27.49%; ▌Thomas Casey (Right to Life) 2.06%; ▌Albert LaBruna (Green) 1.38%
New York 28	Louise Slaughter	Democratic	1986	Incumbent re-elected.	▌ ✓ Louise Slaughter (Democratic) 62.46%; ▌Henry Wojtaszek (Republican) 37.54%
New York 28	John LaFalce; Redistricted from the 29th district	Democratic	1974	Incumbent retired. Democratic loss.	▌ ✓ Louise Slaughter (Democratic) 62.46%; ▌Henry Wojtaszek (Republican) 37.54%
New York 29	Amo Houghton; Redistricted from the 31st district (now obsolete)	Republican	1986	Incumbent re-elected.	▌ ✓ Amo Houghton (Republican) 73.10%; ▌Kisun Peters (Democratic) 21.26%; ▌Wendy Johnson (Right to Life) 3.34%; ▌Rachel Treichler (Green) 2.30%

== North Carolina ==
The state gained one seat in reapportionment.

District	Incumbent			This race	
District	Member	Party	First elected	Results	Candidates
North Carolina 1	Eva Clayton	Democratic	1992	Incumbent retired. Democratic hold.	▌ ✓ Frank Ballance (Democratic) 63.74%; ▌Greg Dority (Republican) 34.83%; ▌Mike Ruff (Libertarian) 1.43%
North Carolina 2	Bob Etheridge	Democratic	1996	Incumbent re-elected.	▌ ✓ Bob Etheridge (Democratic) 65.36%; ▌Joseph Ellen (Republican) 33.27%; ▌Gary Minter (Libertarian) 1.37%
North Carolina 3	Walter B. Jones Jr.	Republican	1994	Incumbent re-elected.	▌ ✓ Walter B. Jones Jr. (Republican) 90.70%; ▌Gary Goodson (Libertarian) 9.30%
North Carolina 4	David Price	Democratic	1986; 1994 (defeated); 1996	Incumbent re-elected.	▌ ✓ David Price (Democratic) 61.18%; ▌Tuan Nguyen (Republican) 36.15%; ▌Ken Nelson (Libertarian) 2.67%
North Carolina 5	Richard Burr	Republican	1994	Incumbent re-elected.	▌ ✓ Richard Burr (Republican) 70.19%; ▌David Crawford (Democratic) 29.81%
North Carolina 6	Howard Coble	Republican	1984	Incumbent re-elected.	▌ ✓ Howard Coble (Republican) 90.41%; ▌Tara Grubb (Libertarian) 9.59%
North Carolina 7	Mike McIntyre	Democratic	1996	Incumbent re-elected.	▌ ✓ Mike McIntyre (Democratic) 71.13%; ▌James Adams (Republican) 27.32%; ▌David Michael Brooks (Libertarian) 1.54%
North Carolina 8	Robin Hayes	Republican	1998	Incumbent re-elected.	▌ ✓ Robin Hayes (Republican) 53.63%; ▌Chris Kouri (Democratic) 44.62%; ▌Mark Andrew Johnson (Libertarian) 1.75%
North Carolina 9	Sue Myrick	Republican	1994	Incumbent re-elected.	▌ ✓ Sue Myrick (Republican) 72.42%; ▌Ed McGuire (Democratic) 25.83%; ▌Christopher Cole (Libertarian) 1.74%
North Carolina 10	Cass Ballenger	Republican	1986	Incumbent re-elected.	▌ ✓ Cass Ballenger (Republican) 59.30%; ▌Ron Daugherty (Democratic) 37.85%; ▌Christopher M. Hill (Libertarian) 2.85%
North Carolina 11	Charles H. Taylor	Republican	1990	Incumbent re-elected.	▌ ✓ Charles H. Taylor (Republican) 55.54%; ▌Sam Neill (Democratic) 42.85%; ▌Eric Henry (Libertarian) 1.61%
North Carolina 12	Mel Watt	Democratic	1992	Incumbent re-elected.	▌ ✓ Mel Watt (Democratic) 65.34%; ▌Jeff Kish (Republican) 32.79%; ▌Carey Head (Libertarian) 1.98%
North Carolina 13	None (District created)			New district. Democratic gain.	▌ ✓ Brad Miller (Democratic) 54.72%; ▌Carolyn Grant (Republican) 42.39%; ▌Alex MacDonald (Libertarian) 2.89%

== North Dakota ==
District	Incumbent			This race	
District	Member	Party	First elected	Results	Candidates
North Dakota at-large	Earl Pomeroy	Democratic-NPL	1992	Incumbent re-elected.	▌ ✓ Earl Pomeroy (Democratic-NPL) 52.41%; ▌Rick Clayburgh (Republican) 47.59%

== Ohio ==
The state lost one seat in reapportionment.

District	Incumbent			This race	
District	Member	Party	First elected	Results	Candidates
Ohio 1	Steve Chabot	Republican	1994	Incumbent re-elected.	▌ ✓ Steve Chabot (Republican) 64.80%; ▌Greg Harris (Democratic) 35.20%
Ohio 2	Rob Portman	Republican	1993 (special)	Incumbent re-elected.	▌ ✓ Rob Portman (Republican) 74.05%; ▌Charles W. Sanders (Democratic) 25.95%
Ohio 3	Vacant			Rep. Tony P. Hall resigned on September 9, 2002, having been appointed U.S. Ambassador to the United Nations Agencies for Food and Agriculture. Republican gain.	▌ ✓ Mike Turner (Republican) 58.77%; ▌Richard Carne (Democratic) 41.22%
Ohio 4	Mike Oxley	Republican	1981 (special)	Incumbent re-elected.	▌ ✓ Mike Oxley (Republican) 67.52%; ▌Jim Clark (Democratic) 32.48%
Ohio 5	Paul Gillmor	Republican	1988	Incumbent re-elected.	▌ ✓ Paul Gillmor (Republican) 67.08%; ▌Roger C. Anderson (Democratic) 27.55%; ▌John Green (Independent) 5.36%
Ohio 6	Ted Strickland	Democratic	1992; 1994 (defeated); 1996	Incumbent re-elected.	▌ ✓ Ted Strickland (Democratic) 59.48%; ▌Mike Halleck (Republican) 40.52%
Ohio 7	Dave Hobson	Republican	1990	Incumbent re-elected.	▌ ✓ Dave Hobson (Republican) 67.56%; ▌Kara Anastasio (Democratic) 27.18%; ▌Frank Doden (Independent) 5.26%
Ohio 8	John Boehner	Republican	1990	Incumbent re-elected.	▌ ✓ John Boehner (Republican) 70.81%; ▌Jeff Hardenbrook (Democratic) 29.19%
Ohio 9	Marcy Kaptur	Democratic	1982	Incumbent re-elected.	▌ ✓ Marcy Kaptur (Democratic) 73.99%; ▌Ed Emery (Republican) 26.01%
Ohio 10	Dennis Kucinich	Democratic	1996	Incumbent re-elected.	▌ ✓ Dennis Kucinich (Democratic) 74.06%; ▌Jon Heben (Republican) 23.80%; ▌Judy Locy (Independent) 2.14%
Ohio 11	Stephanie Tubbs Jones	Democratic	1998	Incumbent re-elected.	▌ ✓ Stephanie Tubbs Jones (Democratic) 76.33%; ▌Patrick Pappano (Republican) 23.67%
Ohio 12	Pat Tiberi	Republican	2000	Incumbent re-elected.	▌ ✓ Pat Tiberi (Republican) 64.39%; ▌Edward S. Brown (Democratic) 35.61%
Ohio 13	Sherrod Brown	Democratic	1992	Incumbent re-elected.	▌ ✓ Sherrod Brown (Democratic) 68.97%; ▌Ed Oliveros (Republican) 31.03%
Ohio 14	Steve LaTourette; Redistricted from the 19th district	Republican	1994	Incumbent re-elected.	▌ ✓ Steve LaTourette (Republican) 72.12%; ▌Dale Virgil Blanchard (Democratic) 27.82%
Ohio 15	Deborah Pryce	Republican	1992	Incumbent re-elected.	▌ ✓ Deborah Pryce (Republican) 66.59%; ▌Mark P. Brown (Democratic) 33.41%
Ohio 16	Ralph Regula	Republican	1972	Incumbent re-elected.	▌ ✓ Ralph Regula (Republican) 68.87%; ▌Jim Rice (Democratic) 31.13%
Ohio 17	Vacant			Rep. Jim Traficant (D) expelled July 24, 2002, for criminal conviction. Democratic hold.	▌ ✓ Tim Ryan (Democratic) 51.14%; ▌Ann Benjamin (Republican) 33.67%; ▌James Traficant (Independent) 15.19%
Ohio 17	Tom Sawyer; Redistricted from the 14th district	Democratic	1986	Incumbent lost renomination. Democratic loss.	▌ ✓ Tim Ryan (Democratic) 51.14%; ▌Ann Benjamin (Republican) 33.67%; ▌James Traficant (Independent) 15.19%
Ohio 18	Bob Ney	Republican	1994	Incumbent re-elected.	▌ ✓ Bob Ney (Republican); Uncontested

== Oklahoma ==
The state lost one seat in reapportionment.

District	Incumbent			This race	
District	Member	Party	First elected	Results	Candidates
Oklahoma 1	John Sullivan	Republican	2002 sp	Incumbent re-elected.	▌ ✓ John Sullivan (Republican) 55.62%; ▌Doug Dodd (Democratic) 42.17%; ▌Joe Cristiano (Independent) 2.21%
Oklahoma 2	Brad Carson	Democratic	2000	Incumbent re-elected.	▌ ✓ Brad Carson (Democratic) 74.12%; ▌Kent Pharaoh (Republican) 25.88%
Oklahoma 3	Wes Watkins	Republican	1976; 1990 (retired); 1996	Incumbent retired. Republican loss.	▌ ✓ Frank Lucas (Republican) 75.58%; ▌Robert T. Murphy (Democratic) 24.42%
Oklahoma 3	Frank Lucas; Redistricted from the 6th district	Republican	1994	Incumbent re-elected.	▌ ✓ Frank Lucas (Republican) 75.58%; ▌Robert T. Murphy (Democratic) 24.42%
Oklahoma 4	J. C. Watts	Republican	1994	Incumbent retired. Republican hold.	▌ ✓ Tom Cole (Republican) 53.83%; ▌Darryl Roberts (Democratic) 46.17%
Oklahoma 5	Ernest Istook	Republican	1992	Incumbent re-elected.	▌ ✓ Ernest Istook (Republican) 62.23%; ▌Lou Barlow (Democratic) 32.41%; ▌Donna C. Davis (Independent) 5.37%

== Oregon ==
District	Incumbent			This race	
District	Member	Party	First elected	Results	Candidates
Oregon 1	David Wu	Democratic	1998	Incumbent re-elected.	▌ ✓ David Wu (Democratic) 62.69%; ▌Jim Greenfield (Republican) 33.99%; ▌Beth A. King (Libertarian) 3.21%
Oregon 2	Greg Walden	Republican	1998	Incumbent re-elected.	▌ ✓ Greg Walden (Republican) 71.86%; ▌Peter J. Buckley (Democratic) 25.76%; ▌Mike Wood (Libertarian) 2.25%
Oregon 3	Earl Blumenauer	Democratic	1996	Incumbent re-elected.	▌ ✓ Earl Blumenauer (Democratic) 66.75%; ▌Sarah Seale (Republican) 26.73%; ▌Walt Brown (Socialist) 2.80%; ▌Kevin Jones (Libertarian) 2.00%; ▌David Brownlow (Constitution) 2.49%
Oregon 4	Peter DeFazio	Democratic	1986	Incumbent re-elected.	▌ ✓ Peter DeFazio (Democratic) 63.82%; ▌Liz VanLeeuwen (Republican) 34.36%; ▌Chris Bigelow (Libertarian) 1.75%
Oregon 5	Darlene Hooley	Democratic	1996	Incumbent re-elected.	▌ ✓ Darlene Hooley (Democratic) 54.75%; ▌Brian Boquist (Republican) 45.10%

== Pennsylvania ==
The state lost two seats in reapportionment.

District	Incumbent			This race	
District	Member	Party	First elected	Results	Candidates
Pennsylvania 1	Bob Brady	Democratic	1998	Incumbent re-elected.	▌ ✓ Bob Brady (Democratic) 86.43%; ▌Marie Delany (Republican) 12.45%; ▌Mike Ewall (Green) 1.12%
Pennsylvania 2	Chaka Fattah	Democratic	1994	Incumbent re-elected.	▌ ✓ Chaka Fattah (Democratic) 87.77%; ▌Thomas Dougherty (Republican) 12.23%
Pennsylvania 3	Phil English; Redistricted from the 21st district	Republican	1994	Incumbent re-elected.	▌ ✓ Phil English (Republican) 77.67%; ▌AnnDrea Benson (Green) 22.32%
Pennsylvania 4	Melissa Hart	Republican	2000	Incumbent re-elected.	▌ ✓ Melissa Hart (Republican) 64.55%; ▌Stevan Drobac (Democratic) 35.44%
Pennsylvania 5	John Peterson	Republican	1996	Incumbent re-elected.	▌ ✓ John Peterson (Republican) 87.24%; ▌Thomas A. Martin (Libertarian) 12.62%
Pennsylvania 6	None (District created)			New district. Republican gain.	▌ ✓ Jim Gerlach (Republican) 51.36%; ▌Dan Wofford (Democratic) 48.63%
Pennsylvania 7	Curt Weldon	Republican	1986	Incumbent re-elected.	▌ ✓ Curt Weldon (Republican) 66.09%; ▌Peter Lennon (Democratic) 33.91%
Pennsylvania 8	Jim Greenwood	Republican	1992	Incumbent re-elected.	▌ ✓ Jim Greenwood (Republican) 62.58%; ▌Timothy Reece (Democratic) 37.40%
Pennsylvania 9	Bill Shuster	Republican	2001 (special)	Incumbent re-elected.	▌ ✓ Bill Shuster (Republican) 71.02%; ▌John R. Henry (Democratic) 28.92%
Pennsylvania 10	Don Sherwood	Republican	1998	Incumbent re-elected.	▌ ✓ Don Sherwood (Republican) 92.60%; ▌Kurt Shotko (Green) 7.07%
Pennsylvania 11	Paul Kanjorski	Democratic	1984	Incumbent re-elected.	▌ ✓ Paul Kanjorski (Democratic) 55.60%; ▌Lou Barletta (Republican) 42.43%; ▌Tom McLaughlin (Reform) 1.96%
Pennsylvania 12	John Murtha	Democratic	1974	Incumbent re-elected.	▌ ✓ John Murtha (Democratic) 73.48%; ▌Bill Choby (Republican) 26.52%
Pennsylvania 12	Frank Mascara; Redistricted from the 20th district	Democratic	1994	Incumbent lost renomination. Democratic loss.	▌ ✓ John Murtha (Democratic) 73.48%; ▌Bill Choby (Republican) 26.52%
Pennsylvania 13	Joe Hoeffel	Democratic	1998	Incumbent re-elected.	▌ ✓ Joe Hoeffel (Democratic) 50.95%; ▌Melissa Brown (Republican) 47.34%; ▌John P. McDermott (Constitution) 1.71%
Pennsylvania 13	Robert Borski; Redistricted from the 3rd district	Democratic	1982	Incumbent retired. Democratic loss.	▌ ✓ Joe Hoeffel (Democratic) 50.95%; ▌Melissa Brown (Republican) 47.34%; ▌John P. McDermott (Constitution) 1.71%
Pennsylvania 14	William J. Coyne	Democratic	1980	Incumbent retired. Democratic loss.	▌ ✓ Mike Doyle (Democratic); Uncontested
Pennsylvania 14	Mike Doyle; Redistricted from the 18th district	Democratic	1994	Incumbent re-elected.	▌ ✓ Mike Doyle (Democratic); Uncontested
Pennsylvania 15	Pat Toomey	Republican	1998	Incumbent re-elected.	▌ ✓ Pat Toomey (Republican) 57.36%; ▌Ed O'Brien (Democratic) 42.64%
Pennsylvania 16	Joe Pitts	Republican	1996	Incumbent re-elected.	▌ ✓ Joe Pitts (Republican) 88.45%; ▌Will Todd (Green) 6.48%; ▌Kenneth Brenneman (Constitution) 5.03%
Pennsylvania 17	George Gekas	Republican	1982	Incumbent lost re-election. Republican loss.	▌ ✓ Tim Holden (Democratic) 51.41%; ▌George Gekas (Republican) 48.59%
Pennsylvania 17	Tim Holden; Redistricted from the 6th district	Democratic	1992	Incumbent re-elected.	▌ ✓ Tim Holden (Democratic) 51.41%; ▌George Gekas (Republican) 48.59%
Pennsylvania 18	None (District created)			New district. Republican gain.	▌ ✓ Tim Murphy (Republican) 60.14%; ▌Jack Machek (Democratic) 39.86%
Pennsylvania 19	Todd Platts	Republican	2000	Incumbent re-elected.	▌ ✓ Todd Platts (Republican) 91.06%; ▌Ben Price (Green) 5.03%; ▌Kenneth Brenneman (Libertarian) 3.82%

== Rhode Island ==
District	Incumbent			This race	
District	Member	Party	First elected	Results	Candidates
Rhode Island 1	Patrick J. Kennedy	Democratic	1994	Incumbent re-elected.	▌ ✓ Patrick J. Kennedy (Democratic) 59.88%; ▌David W. Rogers (Republican) 37.31%; ▌Frank Carter (Libertarian) 2.71%
Rhode Island 2	James Langevin	Democratic	2000	Incumbent re-elected.	▌ ✓ James Langevin (Democratic) 76.29%; ▌John Matson (Republican) 22.27%; ▌Dorman Hayes (Independent) 1.37%

== South Carolina ==
District	Incumbent			This race	
District	Member	Party	First elected	Results	Candidates
South Carolina 1	Henry Brown	Republican	2000	Incumbent re-elected.	▌ ✓ Henry Brown (Republican) 89.56%; ▌James E. Dunn (United Citizens) 6.91%; ▌Joe Innella (Natural Law) 3.49%
South Carolina 2	Joe Wilson	Republican	2001 (special)	Incumbent re-elected.	▌ ✓ Joe Wilson (Republican) 84.12%; ▌Mark Whittington (United Citizens) 10.03%; ▌Jim Legg (Libertarian) 5.63%
South Carolina 3	Lindsey Graham	Republican	1994	Incumbent retired to run for U.S. senator. Republican hold.	▌ ✓ Gresham Barrett (Republican) 67.14%; ▌George Brightharp (Democratic) 31.28%; ▌Mike Boerste (Libertarian) 1.56%
South Carolina 4	Jim DeMint	Republican	1998	Incumbent re-elected.	▌ ✓ Jim DeMint (Republican) 69.00%; ▌Peter Ashy (Democratic) 29.67%; ▌Faye Walters (Natural Law) 1.23%
South Carolina 5	John Spratt	Democratic	1982	Incumbent re-elected.	▌ ✓ John Spratt (Democratic) 85.87%; ▌Doug Kendall (Libertarian) 7.76%; ▌Steve Lefemine (Constitution) 6.29%
South Carolina 6	Jim Clyburn	Democratic	1992	Incumbent re-elected.	▌ ✓ Jim Clyburn (Democratic) 66.98%; ▌Gary McLeod (Republican) 32.03%; ▌Craig Augenstein (Libertarian) 0.96%

== South Dakota ==
District	Incumbent			This race	
District	Member	Party	First elected	Results	Candidates
South Dakota at-large	John Thune	Republican	1996	Incumbent retired to run for U.S. senator. Republican hold.	▌ ✓ Bill Janklow (Republican) 53.45%; ▌Stephanie Herseth (Democratic) 45.62%; ▌Terry Begay (Libertarian) 0.93%

== Tennessee ==
District	Incumbent			This race	
District	Member	Party	First elected	Results	Candidates
Tennessee 1	Bill Jenkins	Republican	1996	Incumbent re-elected.	▌ ✓ Bill Jenkins (Republican); Uncontested
Tennessee 2	Jimmy Duncan	Republican	1988	Incumbent re-elected.	▌ ✓ Jimmy Duncan (Republican) 78.98%; ▌John Greene (Democratic) 19.91%; ▌Joshua Williamson (Independent) 0.60%; ▌George Njezic (Independent) 0.51%
Tennessee 3	Zach Wamp	Republican	1994	Incumbent re-elected.	▌ ✓ Zach Wamp (Republican) 64.54%; ▌John Wolfe Jr. (Democratic) 33.82%; ▌William Bolen (Independent) 1.00%; ▌Timothy Sevier (Independent) 0.54%
Tennessee 4	Van Hilleary	Republican	1994	Incumbent retired to run for Governor of Tennessee. Democratic gain.	▌ ✓ Lincoln Davis (Democratic) 52.08%; ▌Janice Bowling (Republican) 46.49%; ▌William Chandler (Independent) 0.58%; ▌John Ray (Independent) 0.33%; ▌Bert Mason (Independent) 0.27%; ▌Ed Wellmann (Independent) 0.22%
Tennessee 5	Bob Clement	Democratic	1988	Incumbent retired to run for U.S. senator. Democratic hold.	▌ ✓ Jim Cooper (Democratic) 63.73%; ▌Robert Duvall (Republican) 33.25%; ▌John Jay Hooker (Independent) 1.79%; ▌Jonathan Farley (Independent) 0.71%; ▌Jesse Turner (Independent) 0.51%
Tennessee 6	Bart Gordon	Democratic	1984	Incumbent re-elected.	▌ ✓ Bart Gordon (Democratic) 65.92%; ▌Robert Garrison (Republican) 32.33%; ▌Patrick Lyons (Independent) 1.73%
Tennessee 7	Ed Bryant	Republican	1994	Incumbent retired to run for U.S. senator. Republican hold.	▌ ✓ Marsha Blackburn (Republican) 70.73%; ▌Tim Barron (Democratic) 26.48%; ▌Rick Patterson (Independent) 2.77%
Tennessee 8	John S. Tanner	Democratic	1988	Incumbent re-elected.	▌ ✓ John S. Tanner (Democratic) 70.14%; ▌Mat McClain (Republican) 27.30%; ▌James L. Hart (Independent) 2.55%
Tennessee 9	Harold Ford Jr.	Democratic	1996	Incumbent re-elected.	▌ ✓ Harold Ford Jr. (Democratic) 83.81%; ▌Tony Rush (Independent) 16.09%

== Texas ==
The state gained two seats in reapportionment.

District	Incumbent			This race	
District	Member	Party	First elected	Results	Candidates
Texas 1	Max Sandlin	Democratic	1996	Incumbent re-elected.	▌ ✓ Max Sandlin (Democratic) 56.45%; ▌John Lawrence (Republican) 43.55%
Texas 2	Jim Turner	Democratic	1996	Incumbent re-elected.	▌ ✓ Jim Turner (Democratic) 60.85%; ▌Van Brookshire (Republican) 38.19%; ▌Peter Beach (Libertarian) 0.96%
Texas 3	Sam Johnson	Republican	1991 (special)	Incumbent re-elected.	▌ ✓ Sam Johnson (Republican) 73.95%; ▌Manny Molera (Democratic) 24.33%; ▌John E. Davis (Libertarian) 1.72%
Texas 4	Ralph Hall	Democratic	1980	Incumbent re-elected.	▌ ✓ Ralph Hall (Democratic) 57.82%; ▌John Graves (Republican) 40.37%; ▌Barbara Robinson (Libertarian) 1.81%
Texas 5	None (District created)			New district. Republican gain.	▌ ✓ Jeb Hensarling (Republican) 58.21%; ▌Ron Chapman (Democratic) 40.26%; ▌Dan Michalski (Libertarian) 0.92%; ▌Thomas Kemper (Green) 0.61%
Texas 6	Joe Barton	Republican	1984	Incumbent re-elected.	▌ ✓ Joe Barton (Republican) 70.35%; ▌Felix Alvarado (Democratic) 27.68%; ▌Frank Brady (Libertarian) 1.21%; ▌B. J. Armstrong (Green) 0.76%
Texas 7	John Culberson	Republican	2000	Incumbent re-elected.	▌ ✓ John Culberson (Republican) 89.19%; ▌Drew P. Parks (Libertarian) 10.76%
Texas 8	Kevin Brady	Republican	1996	Incumbent re-elected.	▌ ✓ Kevin Brady (Republican) 93.14%; ▌Gil Guillory (Libertarian) 6.86%
Texas 9	Nick Lampson	Democratic	1996	Incumbent re-elected.	▌ ✓ Nick Lampson (Democratic) 58.60%; ▌Paul Williams (Republican) 40.31%; ▌Dean L. Tucker (Libertarian) 1.09%
Texas 10	Lloyd Doggett	Democratic	1994	Incumbent re-elected.	▌ ✓ Lloyd Doggett (Democratic) 84.37%; ▌Michele Messina (Libertarian) 15.63%
Texas 11	Chet Edwards	Democratic	1990	Incumbent re-elected.	▌ ✓ Chet Edwards (Democratic) 51.55%; ▌Ramsey Farley (Republican) 47.11%; ▌Andrew Paul Farris (Libertarian) 1.34%
Texas 12	Kay Granger	Republican	1996	Incumbent re-elected.	▌ ✓ Kay Granger (Republican) 91.87%; ▌Edward A. Hanson (Libertarian) 8.13%
Texas 13	Mac Thornberry	Republican	1994	Incumbent re-elected.	▌ ✓ Mac Thornberry (Republican) 79.27%; ▌Zane Reese (Democratic) 20.73%
Texas 14	Ron Paul	Republican	1976 (special); 1976 (defeated); 1978; 1984 (retired); 1996	Incumbent re-elected.	▌ ✓ Ron Paul (Republican) 68.09%; ▌Corby Windham (Democratic) 31.91%
Texas 15	Rubén Hinojosa	Democratic	1996	Incumbent re-elected.	▌ ✓ Rubén Hinojosa (Democratic); Uncontested
Texas 16	Silvestre Reyes	Democratic	1996	Incumbent re-elected.	▌ ✓ Silvestre Reyes (Democratic); Uncontested
Texas 17	Charles Stenholm	Democratic	1978	Incumbent re-elected.	▌ ✓ Charles Stenholm (Democratic) 51.36%; ▌Rob Beckham (Republican) 47.39%; ▌Fred Jones (Libertarian) 1.25%
Texas 18	Sheila Jackson Lee	Democratic	1994	Incumbent re-elected.	▌ ✓ Sheila Jackson Lee (Democratic) 76.91%; ▌Phillip Abbott (Republican) 21.70%; ▌Brent Sullivan (Libertarian) 1.38%
Texas 19	Larry Combest	Republican	1984	Incumbent re-elected.	▌ ✓ Larry Combest (Republican) 91.64%; ▌Larry Johnson (Libertarian) 8.36%
Texas 20	Charlie González	Democratic	1998	Incumbent re-elected.	▌ ✓ Charlie González (Democratic); Uncontested
Texas 21	Lamar S. Smith	Republican	1986	Incumbent re-elected.	▌ ✓ Lamar S. Smith (Republican) 72.87%; ▌John Courage (Democratic) 25.31%; ▌D. G. Roberts (Libertarian) 1.82%
Texas 22	Tom DeLay	Republican	1984	Incumbent re-elected.	▌ ✓ Tom DeLay (Republican) 63.17%; ▌Tim Riley (Democratic) 35.02%; ▌Jerry LaFleur (Libertarian) 1.01%; ▌Joel West (Green) 0.79%
Texas 23	Henry Bonilla	Republican	1992	Incumbent re-elected.	▌ ✓ Henry Bonilla (Republican) 51.53%; ▌Henry Cuellar (Democratic) 47.20%; ▌Jeffrey C. Blunt (Libertarian) 0.73%; ▌Ed Scharf (Green) 0.54%
Texas 24	Martin Frost	Democratic	1978	Incumbent re-elected.	▌ ✓ Martin Frost (Democratic) 64.66%; ▌Mike Rivera Ortega (Republican) 33.95%; ▌Ken Ashby (Libertarian) 1.38%
Texas 25	Ken Bentsen	Democratic	1994	Incumbent retired to run for U.S. senator. Democratic hold.	▌ ✓ Chris Bell (Democratic) 54.76%; ▌Tom Reiser (Republican) 43.09%; ▌George Reiter (Green) 1.20%; ▌Guy McLendon (Libertarian) 0.94%
Texas 26	Dick Armey	Republican	1984	Incumbent retired. Republican hold.	▌ ✓ Michael C. Burgess (Republican) 74.81%; ▌Paul LeBon (Democratic) 22.76%; ▌David Croft (Libertarian) 1.44%; ▌Gary R. Page (Green) 0.99%
Texas 27	Solomon P. Ortiz	Democratic	1982	Incumbent re-elected.	▌ ✓ Solomon P. Ortiz (Democratic) 61.10%; ▌Pat Ahumada (Republican) 36.54%; ▌Christopher J. Claytor (Libertarian) 2.36%
Texas 28	Ciro Rodriguez	Democratic	1997 (special)	Incumbent re-elected.	▌ ✓ Ciro Rodriguez (Democratic) 71.09%; ▌Gabriel Perales (Republican) 26.86%; ▌William Stallknecht (Independent) 2.05%
Texas 29	Gene Green	Democratic	1992	Incumbent re-elected.	▌ ✓ Gene Green (Democratic) 95.16%; ▌Joe Vu (Libertarian) 4.84%
Texas 30	Eddie Bernice Johnson	Democratic	1992	Incumbent re-elected.	▌ ✓ Eddie Bernice Johnson (Democratic) 74.26%; ▌Ron Bush (Republican) 24.19%; ▌Lance Flores (Libertarian) 1.55%
Texas 31	None (District created)			New district. Republican gain.	▌ ✓ John Carter (Republican) 69.08%; ▌David Bagley (Democratic) 27.36%; ▌Clark Simmons (Libertarian) 1.26%; ▌John S. Petersen (Green) 1.23%; ▌R. C. Crawford (Independent) 1.06%
Texas 32	Pete Sessions; Redistricted from the 5th district	Republican	1996	Incumbent re-elected.	▌ ✓ Pete Sessions (Republican) 67.77%; ▌Pauline Dixon (Democratic) 30.35%; ▌Steve Martin (Libertarian) 1.07%; ▌Carla Hubbell (Green) 0.82%

== Utah ==
District	Incumbent			This race	
District	Member	Party	First elected	Results	Candidates
Utah 1	Jim Hansen	Republican	1980	Incumbent retired. Republican hold.	▌ ✓ Rob Bishop (Republican) 60.69%; ▌Dave Thomas (Democratic) 36.84%; ▌Craig Axford (Green) 2.24%
Utah 2	Jim Matheson	Democratic	2000	Incumbent re-elected.	▌ ✓ Jim Matheson (Democratic) 49.43%; ▌John Swallow (Republican) 48.69%; ▌Patrick Diehl (Green) 1.16%; ▌Ron Copier (Libertarian) 0.72%
Utah 3	Chris Cannon	Republican	1996	Incumbent re-elected.	▌ ✓ Chris Cannon (Republican) 67.43%; ▌Matt Throckmorton (Democratic) 28.98%; ▌Kitty Burton (Libertarian) 3.59%

== Vermont ==
District	Incumbent			This race	
District	Member	Party	First elected	Results	Candidates
Vermont at-large	Bernie Sanders	Independent	1990	Incumbent re-elected.	▌ ✓ Bernie Sanders (Independent) 64.26%; ▌Bill Meub (Republican) 32.29%; ▌Jane Newton (Liberty Union-Progressive) 1.41%; ▌Fawn Skinner (Grassroots) 1.04%; ▌Daniel Krymkowski (Libertarian) 0.90%

== Virginia ==
District	Incumbent			This race	
District	Member	Party	First elected	Results	Candidates
Virginia 1	Jo Ann Davis	Republican	2000	Incumbent re-elected.	▌ ✓ Jo Ann Davis (Republican); Uncontested
Virginia 2	Ed Schrock	Republican	2000	Incumbent re-elected.	▌ ✓ Ed Schrock (Republican) 83.15%; ▌D. C. Amarasinghe (Green) 16.49%
Virginia 3	Bobby Scott	Democratic	1992	Incumbent re-elected.	▌ ✓ Bobby Scott (Democratic); Uncontested
Virginia 4	Randy Forbes	Republican	2001 (special)	Incumbent re-elected.	▌ ✓ Randy Forbes (Republican); Uncontested
Virginia 5	Virgil Goode	Republican	1996 (Note: Goode was elected as Democrat. He left the party in January 2000 and became a Republican in August 2002.)	Incumbent re-elected.	▌ ✓ Virgil Goode (Republican) 63.48%; ▌Meredith Richards (Democratic) 36.48%
Virginia 6	Bob Goodlatte	Republican	1992	Incumbent re-elected.	▌ ✓ Bob Goodlatte (Republican); Uncontested
Virginia 7	Eric Cantor	Republican	2000	Incumbent re-elected.	▌ ✓ Eric Cantor (Republican) 69.45%; ▌Ben Jones (Democratic) 30.46%
Virginia 8	Jim Moran	Democratic	1990	Incumbent re-elected.	▌ ✓ Jim Moran (Democratic) 59.81%; ▌Scott Tate (Republican) 37.32%; ▌Ronald Crickenberger (Independent) 2.65%
Virginia 9	Rick Boucher	Democratic	1982	Incumbent re-elected.	▌ ✓ Rick Boucher (Democratic) 65.76%; ▌Jay Katzen (Republican) 34.22%
Virginia 10	Frank Wolf	Republican	1980	Incumbent re-elected.	▌ ✓ Frank Wolf (Republican) 71.72%; ▌John B. Stevens Jr. (Democratic) 28.13%
Virginia 11	Tom Davis	Republican	1994	Incumbent re-elected.	▌ ✓ Tom Davis (Republican) 82.90%; ▌Frank Creel (Constitution) 16.47%

== Washington ==
District	Incumbent			This race	
District	Member	Party	First elected	Results	Candidates
Washington 1	Jay Inslee	Democratic	1992; 1994 (defeated); 1998	Incumbent re-elected.	▌ ✓ Jay Inslee (Democratic) 55.64%; ▌Joe Marine (Republican) 41.31%; ▌Mark B. Wilson (Libertarian) 3.05%
Washington 2	Rick Larsen	Democratic	2000	Incumbent re-elected.	▌ ✓ Rick Larsen (Democratic) 50.07%; ▌Norma Smith (Republican) 45.77%; ▌Bruce Guthrie (Libertarian) 2.14%; ▌Bern Haggerty (Green) 2.02%
Washington 3	Brian Baird	Democratic	1998	Incumbent re-elected.	▌ ✓ Brian Baird (Democratic) 61.69%; ▌Joseph Zarelli (Republican) 38.31%
Washington 4	Doc Hastings	Republican	1994	Incumbent re-elected.	▌ ✓ Doc Hastings (Republican) 66.90%; ▌Craig Mason (Democratic) 33.10%
Washington 5	George Nethercutt	Republican	1994	Incumbent re-elected.	▌ ✓ George Nethercutt (Republican) 62.66%; ▌Bart Haggin (Democratic) 32.21%; ▌Rob Chase (Libertarian) 5.13%
Washington 6	Norm Dicks	Democratic	1976	Incumbent re-elected.	▌ ✓ Norm Dicks (Democratic) 64.20%; ▌Bob Lawrence (Republican) 31.35%; ▌John A. Bennett (Libertarian) 4.45%
Washington 7	Jim McDermott	Democratic	1988	Incumbent re-elected.	▌ ✓ Jim McDermott (Democratic) 74.07%; ▌Carol Thorne Cassady (Republican) 21.92%; ▌Stan Lippmann (Libertarian) 4.00%
Washington 8	Jennifer Dunn	Republican	1992	Incumbent re-elected.	▌ ✓ Jennifer Dunn (Republican) 59.82%; ▌Heidi Behrens-Benedict (Democratic) 37.34%; ▌Mark Taff (Libertarian) 2.84%
Washington 9	Adam Smith	Democratic	1996	Incumbent re-elected.	▌ ✓ Adam Smith (Democratic) 58.52%; ▌Sarah Casada (Republican) 38.57%; ▌J. Mills (Libertarian) 2.91%

== West Virginia ==
District	Incumbent			This race	
District	Member	Party	First elected	Results	Candidates
West Virginia 1	Alan Mollohan	Democratic	1982	Incumbent re-elected.	▌ ✓ Alan Mollohan (Democratic); Uncontested
West Virginia 2	Shelley Moore Capito	Republican	2000	Incumbent re-elected.	▌ ✓ Shelley Moore Capito (Republican) 60.04%; ▌Jim Humphreys (Democratic) 39.96%
West Virginia 3	Nick Rahall	Democratic	1976	Incumbent re-elected.	▌ ✓ Nick Rahall (Democratic) 70.22%; ▌Paul Chapman (Republican) 29.78%

== Wisconsin ==
The state lost one seat in reapportionment.

District	Incumbent			This race	
District	Member	Party	First elected	Results	Candidates
Wisconsin 1	Paul Ryan	Republican	1998	Incumbent re-elected.	▌ ✓ Paul Ryan (Republican) 67.19%; ▌Jeffrey C. Thomas (Democratic) 30.63%; ▌George Meyers (Libertarian) 2.11%
Wisconsin 2	Tammy Baldwin	Democratic	1998	Incumbent re-elected.	▌ ✓ Tammy Baldwin (Democratic) 66.01%; ▌Ron Greer (Republican) 33.83%
Wisconsin 3	Ron Kind	Democratic	1996	Incumbent re-elected.	▌ ✓ Ron Kind (Democratic) 62.82%; ▌Bill Arndt (Republican) 33.54%; ▌George Meyers (Libertarian) 3.20%
Wisconsin 4	Jerry Kleczka	Democratic	1984	Incumbent re-elected.	▌ ✓ Jerry Kleczka (Democratic) 86.32%; ▌Brian Verdin (Green) 12.96%
Wisconsin 4	Tom Barrett; Redistricted from the 5th district	Democratic	1992	Incumbent retired to run for Governor of Wisconsin. Democratic loss.	▌ ✓ Jerry Kleczka (Democratic) 86.32%; ▌Brian Verdin (Green) 12.96%
Wisconsin 5	Jim Sensenbrenner; Redistricted from the 9th district	Republican	1978	Incumbent re-elected.	▌ ✓ Jim Sensenbrenner (Republican) 86.13%; ▌Robert R. Raymond (Independent) 13.32%
Wisconsin 6	Tom Petri	Republican	1979 (special)	Incumbent re-elected.	▌ ✓ Tom Petri (Republican); Uncontested
Wisconsin 7	Dave Obey	Democratic	1969 (special)	Incumbent re-elected.	▌ ✓ Dave Obey (Democratic) 64.21%; ▌Joe Rothbauer (Republican) 35.76%
Wisconsin 8	Mark Green	Republican	1998	Incumbent re-elected.	▌ ✓ Mark Green (Republican) 72.58%; ▌Andrew Becker (Democratic) 23.89%; ▌Dick Kaiser (Green) 3.49%

== Wyoming ==
District	Incumbent			This race	
District	Member	Party	First elected	Results	Candidates
Wyoming at-large	Barbara Cubin	Republican	1994	Incumbent re-elected.	▌ ✓ Barbara Cubin (Republican) 60.51%; ▌Ron Akin (Democratic) 36.21%; ▌Lewis Stock (Libertarian) 3.27%

== See also ==
- 2002 United States elections
  - 2002 United States gubernatorial elections
  - 2002 United States Senate elections
- 107th United States Congress
- 108th United States Congress
