= 2002 United States Senate election in Iowa =

- November 5, 2002
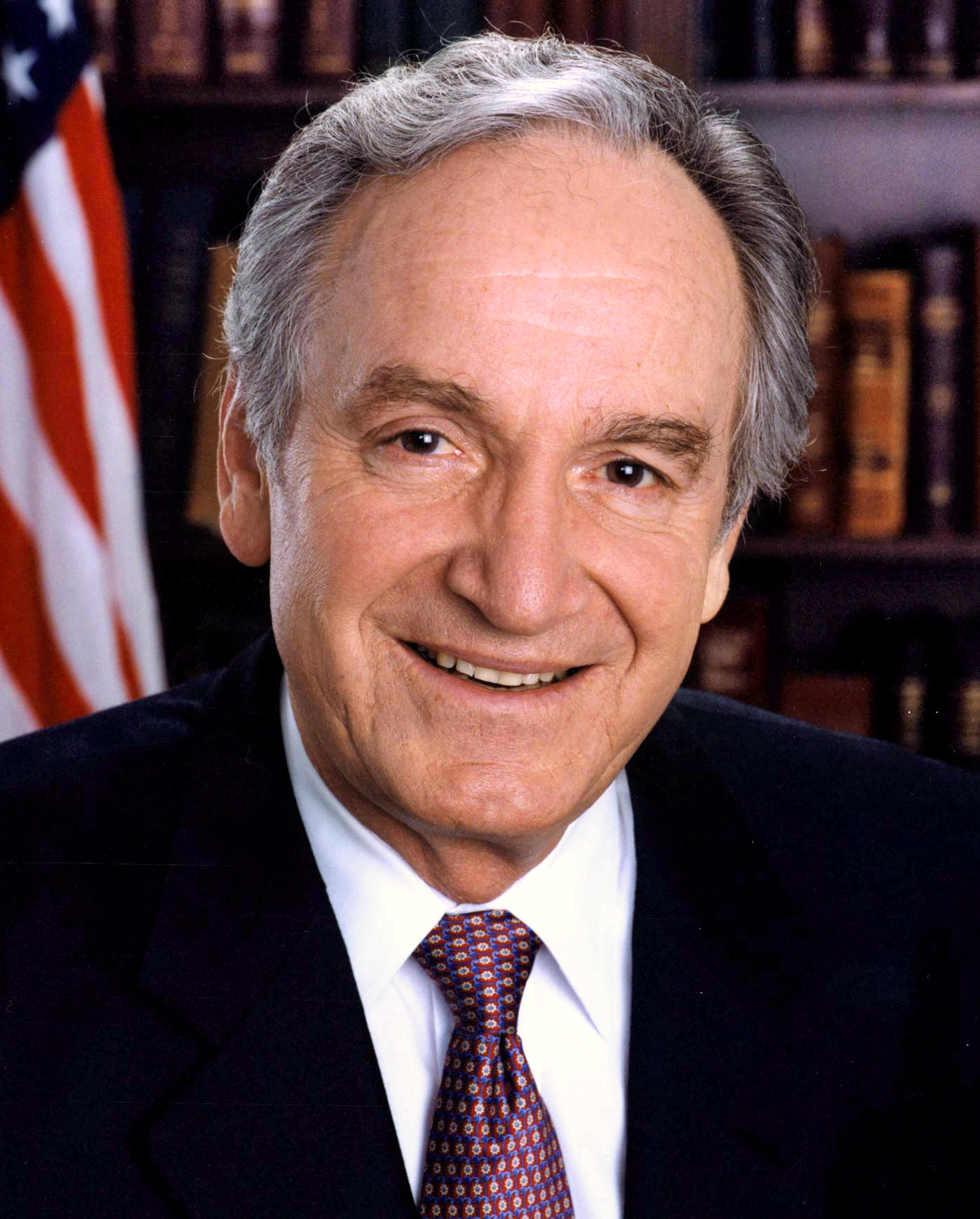

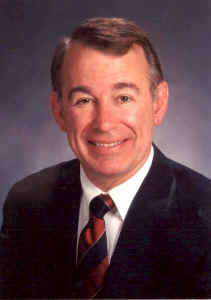
Nominee	Tom Harkin	Greg Ganske
Party	Democratic	Republican
Popular vote	554,278	447,892
Percentage	54.18%	43.78%
- County results Harkin: 40–50% 50–60% 60–70% Ganske: 40–50% 50–60% 60–70% 80–90%
U.S. senator before election
Tom Harkin
Democratic
Elected U.S. Senator
Tom Harkin
Democratic

The 2002 United States Senate election in Iowa was held on November 5, 2002. Incumbent Democratic U.S. Senator Tom Harkin sought re-election to a fourth term in office. Harkin was opposed in the general election by U.S. Congressman Greg Ganske, who fought off a difficult challenger in the Republican primary. Though Harkin narrowly defeated his opponent six years earlier, he was able to defeat Ganske by a comfortable margin to win re-election.

== Democratic primary ==
=== Candidates ===
- Tom Harkin, incumbent United States senator

=== Results ===
Democratic primary results
Party	Candidate	Votes	%
Democratic	Tom Harkin (incumbent)	83,505	99.34%
Democratic	Write-ins	555	0.66%
Total votes		84,060	100.00%

== Republican primary ==
=== Candidates ===
- Greg Ganske, U.S. representative from Des Moines
- Bill Salier, hog farmer

=== Results ===
Republican primary results
Party	Candidate	Votes	%
Republican	Greg Ganske	116,229	58.97%
Republican	Bill Salier	80,700	40.95%
Republican	Write-ins	167	0.08%
Total votes		197,096	100.00%

== General election ==
=== Debates ===
- Complete video of debate, October 6, 2002

=== Predictions ===
Source	Ranking	As of
Sabato's Crystal Ball	Lean D	November 4, 2002

=== Polling ===
Poll source	Date(s) administered	Sample size (Note: Key: A – all adults RV – registered voters LV – likely voters V – unclear)	Margin of error	Tom Harkin (D)	Greg Ganske (R)	Other / Undecided
SurveyUSA	October 27–29, 2002	605 (LV)	± 4.1%	60%	38%	2%

=== Results ===
United States Senate election in Iowa, 2002
Party	Candidate	Votes	%	±%
Democratic	Tom Harkin (incumbent)	554,278	54.18%	+2.37%
Republican	Greg Ganske	447,892	43.78%	−2.94%
Green	Timothy A. Harthan	11,340	1.11%	
Libertarian	Richard J. Moore	8,864	0.87%	
Write-in		701	0.06%	
Majority		106,386	10.40%	+5.30%
Turnout		1,023,075		
Democratic hold		Swing		

==== Counties that flipped from Republican to Democratic ====
- Adair (largest city: Greenfield)
- Adams (largest city: Corning)
- Allamakee (largest city: Waukon)
- Audubon (largest city: Audubon)
- Calhoun (largest city: Rockwell City)
- Carroll (largest city: Carroll)
- Cherokee (largest city: Cherokee)
- Clay (largest city: Spencer)
- Decatur (largest city: Lamoni)
- Franklin (largest city: Hampton)
- Guthrie (largest city: Guthrie Center)
- Hancock (largest city: Garner)
- Hardin (largest city: Iowa Falls)
- Kossuth (largest city: Algona)
- Monona (largest city: Onawa)
- Pocahontas (largest city: Pocahontas)
- Ringgold (largest city: Mount Ayr)
- Taylor (largest city: Bedford)
- Union (largest city: Creston)
- Woodbury (largest city: Sioux City)
- Wright (largest city: Eagle Grove)
- Louisa (largest city: Wapello)
- Buena Vista (largest city: Storm Lake)
- Humboldt (largest city: Humboldt)
- Ida (largest city: Ida Grove)
- Sac (largest city: Sac City)
- Dickinson (largest city: Spirit Lake)
- Wayne (largest city: Corydon)

==== Counties that flipped from Democratic to Republican ====
- Delaware (largest city: Manchester)

== See also ==
- 2002 United States Senate elections
