= Greg Ganske =

American politician (born 1949)

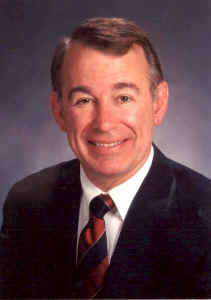

Member of the U.S. House of Representatives from Iowa's 4th district
- In office January 3, 1995 – January 3, 2003
- Preceded by: Neal Smith
- Succeeded by: Leonard Leroy Boswell

Personal details
- Born: John Greg Ganske; March 31, 1949 (age 77) New Hampton, Iowa, U.S.
- Party: Republican
- Education: University of Iowa (BA, MD)

John Greg Ganske (born March 31, 1949) is an American politician, plastic surgeon, and retired U.S. Army reserve lieutenant colonel from Iowa. He served as a Republican member of the United States House of Representatives from 1995 to 2003 and was the unsuccessful Republican nominee for U.S. Senator from Iowa in 2002.

== Early life and education ==
Ganske was born in New Hampton, Iowa to parents Victor and Mary Jo Ganske. He earned honors in wrestling in high school, and was an American Field Service exchange student to Costa Rica in 1966.

He graduated from the University of Iowa with a B.A.with honors in political science and general science in 1972. In 1976, Ganske graduated from the University of Iowa School of Medicine, and subsequently completed a general surgery residency in 1982 at the Oregon Health Sciences Center and a plastic and reconstructive surgery residency at Harvard in 1984, training under Nobel Laureate Dr. Joe Murray.

== Career ==
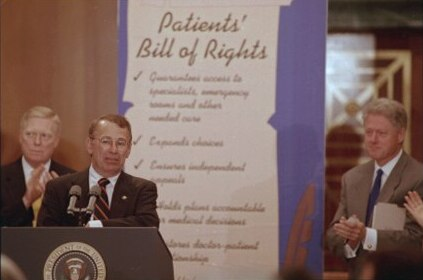
Ganske at a news conference about the Patients' rights with President Bill Clinton and Dick Gephardt in July 1998.

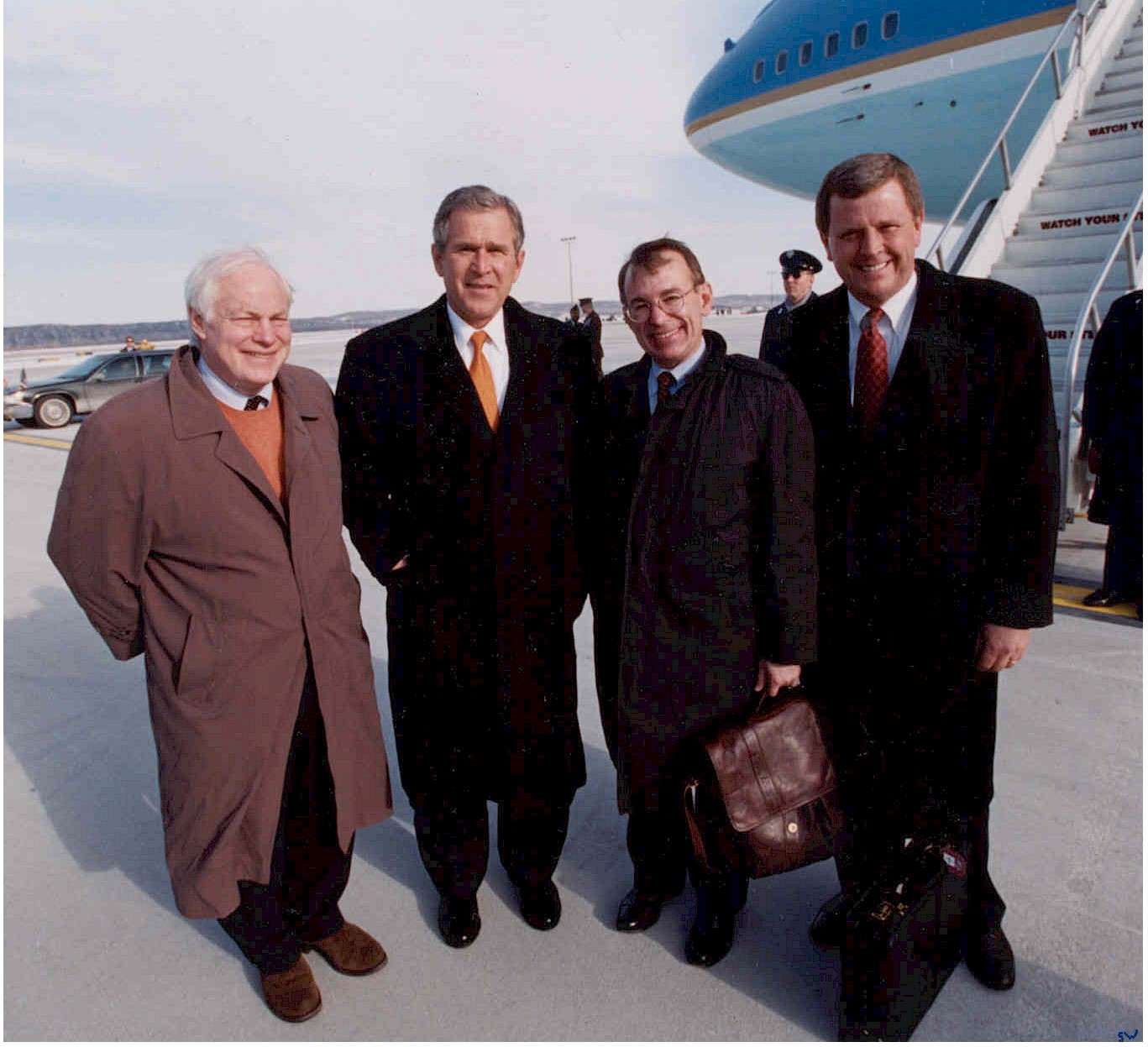
Ganske with President George W. Bush, Tom Latham, and Jim Leach in February 2001.

Ganske worked as a plastic surgeon in Des Moines until he challenged veteran Democratic Congressman Neal Smith in 1994. Ganske campaigned in a cream 1958 DeSoto (Smith having won his first congressional race in that year), playing songs from that era. Ganske was also helped by the 1990s round of redistricting. Smith had previously represented a district that was more or less coextensive with the Des Moines metropolitan area, but redistricting had pushed it into southwestern Iowa, an area Smith did not know and that did not know him. In one of the biggest upsets in recent congressional history, Ganske defeated Smith by six points, largely by running up large margins in southwestern Iowa.

Ganske was nearly defeated for reelection in 1996, but was reelected with little difficulty in 1998 and 2000. He was considered a relatively moderate Republican, which played well in a district dominated by traditionally-Democratic Des Moines.

After the 2000 round of redistricting, much of the 4th district was shifted into the 5th district, which created a district that covered all of western Iowa. However, Ganske's home city of Des Moines was drawn into the 3rd district, represented by Democrat Leonard Boswell. Rather than running for reelection, Ganske ran for the United States Senate against incumbent Democrat Tom Harkin. He easily won the Republican nomination, but lost to Harkin by 10 points. Following that election, he resumed his practice in Des Moines. Ganske was succeeded by Democrat incumbent Rep. Leonard Leroy Boswell after the redistricting.

== Legislative activity ==
According to Congress.gov, during his time in Congress Ganske sponsored 28 pieces of legislation and cosponsored hundreds more."Representative Greg Ganske — Member Activity". Congress.gov, Library of Congress.

== Elections ==
=== 1994 ===
Ganske was elected to the U.S. House from Iowa's 4th district in 1994, defeating incumbent Neal Smith."94 Congressional Election Statistics (Iowa)". Office of the Clerk, U.S. House of Representatives.

Year	Office	Candidate	Party	Votes	%
1994	U.S. House (IA-4)	Greg Ganske	Republican	111,935	52.5
1994	U.S. House (IA-4)	Neal Smith	Democratic	98,824	46.4

== 2002 U.S. Senate campaign ==
In 2002, Ganske ran for the U.S. Senate in Iowa and lost the general election to incumbent Tom Harkin."Canvass Summary FINAL — 2002 General Election (United States Senator)" (PDF). Iowa Secretary of State.

== Personal life ==
During medical school, Ganske met and married his wife, Corrine Mikkelson.

=== Op-eds ===
Ganske has written numerous opinion columns for regional and national outlets. Selected op-eds include:

- Federal assault weapons ban should be renewed — The Des Moines Register (2025).
- Stochastic Terrorism, Hate Speech and the First Amendment — Townhall (2025).
- What a Golfer's Musings on the Meaning of Life Can Teach the Rest of Us (Especially Politicians) — Townhall (2025).
- Will Proposed New FDA Nicotine Content Rule Fail Like Alcohol Prohibition? — Townhall (2025).
- Congress should cut spending more, taxes less — The Des Moines Register (2025).
- ‘Original Sin’ lets many players in Biden's scandal off the hook — The Des Moines Register (2025).
- Why so many champion wrestlers credit their faith in Jesus — The Des Moines Register (2025).
- I enjoy Iowa Public Radio, but NPR's liberal bias complicates things — The Des Moines Register (2025).
- Are DOGE, Elon Musk following the example of Iowa “useful pest” H.R. Gross? — The Des Moines Register (2025).
- Let There be Peace on Earth and let it Begin with Me — JohnKassNews (2025).
- Is Chinese Spying Killing Its Own Students? — JohnKassNews (2025).
- Bless Me, Father, For I Have Sinned! — JohnKassNews (2024).
- AI can make it hard to separate truth from fiction. Here’s how to tell the difference. — The Des Moines Register (2024).
- Test politicians, and surgeons, for competency. That's better than age limits. — The Des Moines Register (2023).
- I'm a plastic surgeon. I have concerns about prescribing puberty blockers for children. — The Des Moines Register (2023).
- Hold a morbidity and mortality conference on our COVID-19 response — The Des Moines Register (2022).
- House Republicans Make a Commitment to America — The Wall Street Journal (2022).
- I still think marijuana should be legal. Moderation in all things. — The Des Moines Register (2022).
- Why would war in Ukraine matter to the United States? — The Des Moines Register (2022).

U.S. House of Representatives
Preceded by Neal Smith	Member of the U.S. House of Representatives from Iowa's 4th congressional district 1995–2003	Succeeded by Tom Latham
Party political offices
Preceded by Jim Ross Lightfoot	Republican nominee for U.S. Senator from Iowa (Class 2); 2002	Succeeded by Christopher Reed
U.S. order of precedence (ceremonial)
Preceded by Fred Grandy as Former U.S. Representative	Order of precedence of the United States as Former U.S. Representative	Succeeded by Bruce Braley as Former U.S. Representative
