= List of new members of the 104th United States Congress =

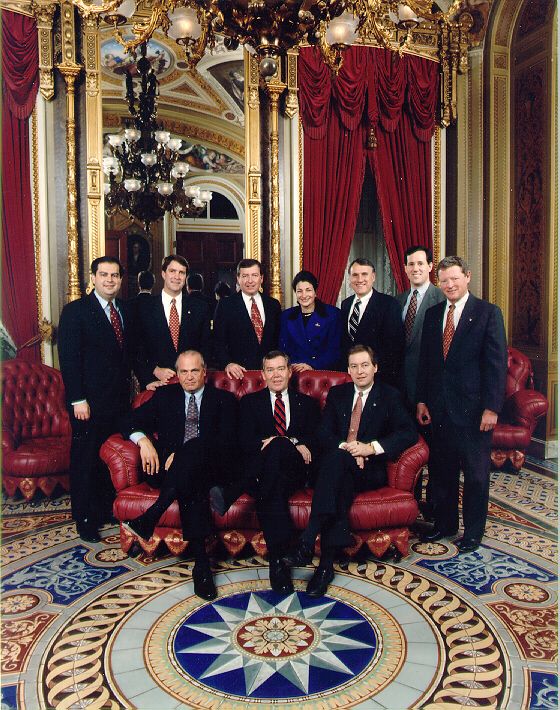
Freshman members of the United States Senate

The 104th United States Congress began on January 3, 1995. There were nine new senators (all Republicans) and 86 new representatives (13 Democrats, 73 Republicans), as well as one new delegate (an independent), at the start of the first session. Additionally, three senators (one Democrat, two Republicans) and seven representatives (four Democrats, three Republicans) took office on various dates in order to fill vacancies during the 104th Congress before it ended on January 3, 1997.

== Senate ==
=== Took office January 3, 1995 ===
State	Image	Senator	Seniority	Switched party	Prior background	Birth year
Arizona		Jon Kyl (R)	3rd (94th overall)	Yes; Open seat; replaced Dennis DeConcini (D)	U.S. House of Representatives (Note: Elected to the 100th Congress, serving from 1987 to 1995 in Arizona's 4th congressional district.)	1942
Maine		Olympia Snowe (R)	1st (92nd overall)	Yes; Open seat; replaced George J. Mitchell (D)	U.S. House of Representatives (Note: Elected to the 96th Congress, serving from 1979 to 1995 in Maine's 2nd congressional district.); Maine Senate; First Lady of Maine	1947
Michigan		Spencer Abraham (R)	8th (99th overall)	Yes; Open seat; replaced Donald Riegle (D)	Michigan Republican Party Chair	1952
Minnesota		Rod Grams (R)	6th (97th overall)	No; Open seat; replaced David Durenberger (R)	U.S. House of Representatives (Note: Elected to the 103rd Congress, serving from 1993 to 1995 in Minnesota's 2nd congressional district.)	1948
Missouri		John Ashcroft (R)	7th (98th overall)	No; Open seat; replaced John Danforth (R)	Governor of Missouri; Missouri Attorney General; State Auditor of Missouri	1942
Ohio		Mike DeWine (R)	2nd (93rd overall)	Yes; Open seat; replaced Howard Metzenbaum (D)	Lieutenant Governor of Ohio; U.S. House of Representatives (Note: Elected to the 98th Congress, serving from 1983 to 1991 in Ohio's 7th congressional district.); Ohio Senate	1947
Pennsylvania		Rick Santorum (R)	5th (96th overall)	Yes; Defeated Harris Wofford (D)	U.S. House of Representatives (Note: Elected to the 102nd Congress, serving from 1991 to 1995 in Pennsylvania's 18th congressional district.)	1958
Tennessee		Bill Frist (R)	9th (100th overall)	Yes; Defeated Jim Sasser (D)	Surgeon	1952
Wyoming		Craig L. Thomas (R)	4th (95th overall)	No; Open seat; replaced Malcolm Wallop (R)	U.S. House of Representatives (Note: Elected to the 101st Congress, serving from 1989 to 1995 in Wyoming's at-large congressional district.); Wyoming House of Representatives	1933

=== Took office during the 104th Congress ===
State	Image	Senator	Took office	Switched party	Prior background	Birth year
Oregon		Ron Wyden (D)	February 5, 1996	Yes; Open seat; replaced Bob Packwood (R)	U.S. House of Representatives (Note: Elected to the 97th Congress, serving from 1981 to 1996 in Oregon's 2nd congressional district.)	1949
Kansas		Sheila Frahm (R)	June 11, 1996	No; Appointed; replaced Bob Dole (R)	Lieutenant Governor of Kansas; Kansas Senate	1945
Kansas		Sam Brownback (R)	November 7, 1996	No; Defeated Sheila Frahm (R) in a primary	U.S. House of Representatives (Note: Elected to the 103rd Congress, serving from 1995 to 1996 in Kansas's 2nd congressional district.); Kansas Secretary of Agriculture	1956

== House of Representatives ==
=== Took office January 3, 1995 ===
District	Representative	Switched party	Prior background	Birth year
Arizona 1	Matt Salmon (R)	Yes	State Senator	1958
Arizona 4	John Shadegg (R)	No	Air National Guard	1949
Arizona 6	J. D. Hayworth (R)	Yes	Television host	1958
California 1	Frank Riggs (R)	Yes	U.S. Representative (Note: Previously elected to the 102nd Congress, serving from 1991 to 1993.)	1950
California 16	Zoe Lofgren (D)	No	Congressional staffer	1947
California 19	George Radanovich (R)	Yes	County commissioner	1955
California 22	Andrea Seastrand (R)	No	State Assemblywoman	1941
California 44	Sonny Bono (R)	No	Mayor of Palm Springs	1935
California 49	Brian Bilbray (R)	Yes	County supervisor	1951
Florida 1	Joe Scarborough (R)	Yes	Lawyer	1963
Florida 15	Dave Weldon (R)	Yes	Physician	1953
Florida 16	Mark Foley (R)	No	State Senator	1954
Georgia 7	Bob Barr (R)	Yes	U.S. Attorney	1948
Georgia 8	Saxby Chambliss (R)	Yes	Lawyer	1943
Georgia 10	Charlie Norwood (R)	Yes	Army Captain	1941
Idaho 1	Helen Chenoweth (R)	Yes	Consultant	1938
Illinois 5	Michael Patrick Flanagan (R)	Yes	Army Captain	1962
Illinois 11	Jerry Weller (R)	Yes	State Representative	1957
Illinois 18	Ray LaHood (R)	No	State Representative	1945
Indiana 2	David M. McIntosh (R)	Yes	Domestic Policy Council	1958
Indiana 4	Mark Souder (R)	Yes	Congressional aide	1950
Indiana 8	John Hostettler (R)	Yes	Engineer	1961
Iowa 4	Greg Ganske (R)	Yes	Plastic surgeon	1949
Iowa 5	Tom Latham (R)	No	Businessman	1948
Kansas 2	Sam Brownback (R)	Yes	Kansas Secretary of Agriculture	1956
Kansas 4	Todd Tiahrt (R)	Yes	State Senator	1951
Kentucky 1	Ed Whitfield (R)	Yes	State Representative	1943
Kentucky 3	Mike Ward (D)	No	State Representative	1951
Maine 1	James B. Longley Jr. (R)	Yes	Lawyer	1951
Maine 2	John Baldacci (D)	Yes	State Senator	1955
Maryland 2	Bob Ehrlich (R)	No	State Delegate	1957
Michigan 8	Dick Chrysler (R)	Yes	Automobile manufacturer	1942
Michigan 13	Lynn N. Rivers (D)	No	State Representative	1956
Minnesota 1	Gil Gutknecht (R)	Yes	State Representative	1951
Minnesota 6	Bill Luther (D)	Yes	State Senator	1945
Mississippi 1	Roger Wicker (R)	Yes	State Senator	1951
Missouri 5	Karen McCarthy (D)	No	State Representative	1947
Nebraska 2	Jon Lynn Christensen (R)	Yes	Marketer	1963
Nevada 1	John Ensign (R)	Yes	Veterinarian	1958
New Hampshire 2	Charles Bass (R)	Yes	State Senator	1952
New Jersey 2	Frank LoBiondo (R)	Yes	State Assemblyman	1946
New Jersey 8	William J. Martini (R)	Yes	Chosen Freeholder	1947
New Jersey 11	Rodney Frelinghuysen (R)	No	State Assemblyman	1946
New York 1	Michael Forbes (R)	Yes	Small Business Administration	1952
New York 4	Dan Frisa (R)	No	State Assemblyman	1955
New York 19	Sue W. Kelly (R)	No	Congressional advisor	1936
North Carolina 2	David Funderburk (R)	Yes	U.S. Ambassador to Romania	1944
North Carolina 3	Walter B. Jones Jr. (R)	Yes	State Representative	1943
North Carolina 4	Fred Heineman (R)	Yes	Police chief	1929
North Carolina 5	Richard Burr (R)	Yes	Sales manager	1955
North Carolina 9	Sue Myrick (R)	No	Mayor of Charlotte	1941
Ohio 1	Steve Chabot (R)	Yes	City Councilor	1953
Ohio 6	Frank Cremeans (R)	Yes	Businessman	1943
Ohio 18	Bob Ney (R)	Yes	State Senator	1954
Ohio 19	Steve LaTourette (R)	Yes	Public defender	1954
Oklahoma 1	Steve Largent (R)	No	Professional football player	1954
Oklahoma 2	Tom Coburn (R)	Yes	Doctor	1948
Oklahoma 4	J. C. Watts (R)	Yes	College football player	1957
Oregon 2	Wes Cooley (R)	No	State Senator	1932
Oregon 5	Jim Bunn (R)	Yes	State Senator	1956
Pennsylvania 2	Chaka Fattah (D)	No	State Senator	1956
Pennsylvania 13	Jon D. Fox (R)	Yes	County Commissioner	1947
Pennsylvania 18	Mike Doyle (D)	Yes	City Councilor	1953
Pennsylvania 20	Frank Mascara (D)	No	County Commissioner	1930
Pennsylvania 21	Phil English (R)	No	City Controller	1956
Rhode Island 1	Patrick J. Kennedy (D)	Yes	State Representative	1967
South Carolina 1	Mark Sanford (R)	No	Air Force Captain	1960
South Carolina 3	Lindsey Graham (R)	Yes	State Representative	1955
Tennessee 3	Zach Wamp (R)	Yes	County party chairman	1957
Tennessee 4	Van Hilleary (R)	Yes	Air Force Reserve Command	1959
Tennessee 7	Ed Bryant (R)	No	U.S. Attorney	1948
Texas 9	Steve Stockman (R)	Yes	Salesman	1956
Texas 10	Lloyd Doggett (D)	No	Supreme Court Justice	1946
Texas 13	Mac Thornberry (R)	Yes	Congressional staffer	1958
Texas 18	Sheila Jackson Lee (D)	No	City Councilor	1950
Texas 25	Ken Bentsen Jr. (D)	No	Investment banker	1959
Utah 2	Enid Greene Waldholtz (R)	Yes	Lawyer	1958
Virginia 11	Tom Davis (R)	Yes	County Supervisor	1949
Washington 1	Rick White (R)	Yes	Lawyer	1953
Washington 2	Jack Metcalf (R)	Yes	State Senator	1927
Washington 3	Linda Smith (R)	Yes	State Senator	1950
Washington 4	Doc Hastings (R)	Yes	State Representative	1941
Washington 5	George Nethercutt (R)	Yes	Attorney	1944
Washington 9	Randy Tate (R)	Yes	State Representative	1965
Wisconsin 1	Mark Neumann (R)	Yes	Home builder	1954
Wyoming at-large	Barbara Cubin (R)	No	State Senator	1946

==== Non-voting members ====
District	Delegate	Switched party	Prior background	Birth year
U.S. Virgin Islands at-large	Victor O. Frazer (I)	Yes	Lawyer	1943

=== Took office during the 104th Congress ===
District	Representative	Took office	Switched party	Prior background	Birth year
California 15	Tom Campbell (R)	December 12, 1995	Yes	U.S. Representative	1952
Illinois 2	Jesse Jackson Jr. (D)	December 12, 1995	No	Campaign manager	1965
California 37	Juanita Millender-McDonald (D)	March 26, 1996	No	State Assemblywoman	1938
Maryland 7	Elijah Cummings (D)	April 16, 1996	No	State Delegate	1951
Oregon 3	Earl Blumenauer (D)	May 21, 1996	No	City Commissioner	1948
Missouri 8	Jo Ann Emerson (R)	November 5, 1996	No	None	1950
Kansas 2	Jim Ryun (R)	November 27, 1996	No	Olympic athlete	1947

== See also ==
- List of United States representatives in the 104th Congress
- List of United States senators in the 104th Congress

== Notes ==
Preceded by New members of the 103rd Congress	New members of the 104th Congress; 1995–1997	Succeeded by New members of the 105th Congress
