= List of new members of the 105th United States Congress =

The 105th United States Congress began on January 3, 1997. There were fourteen new senators (six Democrats, eight Republicans) and 72 new representatives (42 Democrats, 30 Republicans) at the start of the first session. Additionally, nine representatives (five Democrats, four Republicans) took office on various dates in order to fill vacancies during the 105th Congress before it ended on January 3, 1999.

== Senate ==
State	Image	Senator	Seniority	Switched party	Prior background	Birth year
Alabama		Jeff Sessions (R)	10th (96th overall)	Yes; Open seat; replaced Howell Heflin (D)	Alabama Attorney General; U.S. Attorney	1946
Arkansas		Tim Hutchinson (R)	7th (93rd overall)	Yes; Open seat; replaced David Pryor (D)	U.S. House of Representatives (Note: Elected in the 103rd Congress, serving from 1993 to 1997 in the Arkansas's 3rd congressional district.); Arkansas House of Representatives	1949
Colorado		Wayne Allard (R)	5th (91st overall)	No; Open seat; replaced Hank Brown (R)	U.S. House of Representatives (Note: Elected in the 102nd Congress, serving from 1991 to 1997 in the Colorado's 4th congressional district.); Colorado Senate	1943
Georgia		Max Cleland (D)	8th (94th overall)	No; Open seat; replaced Sam Nunn (D)	Georgia Secretary of State; Administrator of Veterans Affairs; Georgia State Senate	1942
Illinois		Dick Durbin (D)	2nd (88th overall)	No; Open seat; replaced Paul Simon (D)	U.S. House of Representatives (Note: Elected in the 98th Congress, serving from 1983 to 1997 in the Illinois's 20th congressional district.)	1944
Kansas		Pat Roberts (R)	1st (87th overall)	No; Open seat; replaced Nancy Kassebaum (R)	U.S. House of Representatives (Note: Elected in the 97th Congress, serving from 1981 to 1997 in the Kansas's 1st congressional district.)	1936
Louisiana		Mary Landrieu (D)	9th (95th overall)	No; Open seat; replaced J. Bennett Johnston (D)	Louisiana State Treasurer; Louisiana House of Representatives	1955
Maine		Susan Collins (R)	13th (99th overall)	No; Open seat; replaced William Cohen (R)	None	1952
Nebraska		Chuck Hagel (R)	12th (98th overall)	Yes; Open seat; replaced J. James Exon (D)	None	1946
New Jersey		Robert Torricelli (D)	3rd (89th overall)	No; Open seat; replaced Bill Bradley (D)	U.S. House of Representatives (Note: Elected in the 98th Congress, serving from 1983 to 1997 in the New Jersey's 9th congressional district.)	1951
Oregon		Gordon H. Smith (R)	11th (97th overall)	No; Open seat; replaced Mark Hatfield (R)	Oregon State Senate	1952
Rhode Island		Jack Reed (D)	6th (92nd overall)	No; Open seat; replaced Claiborne Pell (D)	U.S. House of Representatives (Note: Elected in the 102nd Congress, serving from 1991 to 1997 in the Rhode Island's 2nd congressional district.); Rhode Island Senate	1949
South Dakota		Tim Johnson (D)	4th (90th overall)	Yes; Defeated Larry Pressler (R)	U.S. House of Representatives (Note: Elected in the 100th Congress, serving from 1987 to 1997 in the South Dakota's at-large congressional district.); South Dakota Senate; South Dakota House of Representatives	1946
Wyoming		Mike Enzi (R)	14th (100th overall)	No; Open seat; replaced Alan Simpson (R)	Wyoming Senate; Wyoming House of Representatives; Mayor of Gillette	1944

== House of Representatives ==
=== Took office January 3, 1997 ===
District	Representative	Switched party	Prior background	Birth year
Alabama 3	Bob Riley (R)	Yes	Businessman	1944
Alabama 4	Robert Aderholt (R)	Yes	Judge	1965
Arkansas 1	Robert Marion Berry (D)	No	Domestic Policy Council	1942
Arkansas 2	Vic Snyder (D)	No	State Senator	1947
Arkansas 3	Asa Hutchinson (R)	No	U.S. Attorney	1950
California 10	Ellen Tauscher (D)	Yes	Campaign chair	1951
California 22	Walter Capps (D)	Yes	Professor	1934
California 24	Brad Sherman (D)	No	State Board of Equalization	1954
California 27	James E. Rogan (R)	No	State Assemblyman	1957
California 46	Loretta Sanchez (D)	Yes	Financial analyst	1960
Colorado 1	Diana DeGette (D)	No	State Representative	1957
Colorado 4	Bob Schaffer (R)	No	State Senator	1962
Connecticut 5	James H. Maloney (D)	Yes	State Senator	1948
Florida 2	Allen Boyd (D)	No	State Representative	1945
Florida 11	Jim Davis (D)	No	State Representative	1957
Florida 19	Robert Wexler (D)	No	State Senator	1961
Illinois 5	Rod Blagojevich (D)	Yes	State Representative	1956
Illinois 7	Danny K. Davis (D)	No	County Commissioner	1941
Illinois 20	John Shimkus (R)	Yes	Army Lieutenant colonel	1958
Indiana 7	Edward A. Pease (R)	No	State Senator	1951
Indiana 10	Julia Carson (D)	No	State Senator	1938
Iowa 3	Leonard Boswell (D)	Yes	State Senator	1934
Kansas 1	Jerry Moran (R)	No	State Senator	1954
Kansas 3	Vince Snowbarger (R)	No	State Representative	1949
Kentucky 3	Anne Northup (R)	Yes	State Representative	1948
Louisiana 5	John Cooksey (R)	Yes	Air Force Reserve Command	1941
Louisiana 7	Chris John (D)	Yes	State Representative	1960
Maine 1	Tom Allen (D)	Yes	Mayor of Portland	1945
Massachusetts 3	Jim McGovern (D)	Yes	Congressional staffer	1959
Massachusetts 6	John F. Tierney (D)	Yes	Attorney	1951
Massachusetts 10	Bill Delahunt (D)	No	District attorney	1941
Michigan 8	Debbie Stabenow (D)	Yes	State Senator	1950
Michigan 15	Carolyn Cheeks Kilpatrick (D)	No	State Representative	1945
Mississippi 3	Chip Pickering (R)	Yes	Businessman	1963
Missouri 7	Roy Blunt (R)	No	Secretary of State of Missouri	1950
Missouri 9	Kenny Hulshof (R)	Yes	Prosecutor	1958
Montana at-large	Rick Hill (R)	Yes	Surety	1946
Nevada 2	Jim Gibbons (R)	No	State Assemblyman	1944
New Hampshire 1	John E. Sununu (R)	No	Mechanical engineer	1964
New Jersey 8	Bill Pascrell (D)	Yes	State Assemblyman	1937
New Jersey 9	Steve Rothman (D)	No	Mayor of Englewood	1952
New Jersey 12	Michael James Pappas (R)	No	Chosen Freeholder	1960
New York 4	Carolyn McCarthy (D)	Yes	Licensed practical nurse	1944
North Carolina 2	Bob Etheridge (D)	Yes	Superintendent of Public Instruction	1941
North Carolina 4	David Price (D)	Yes	Professor	1940
North Carolina 7	Mike McIntyre (D)	No	Lawyer	1956
Ohio 6	Ted Strickland (D)	Yes	U.S. Representative (Note: Previously elected in the 103rd Congress, serving from 1993 to 1995.)	1941
Ohio 10	Dennis Kucinich (D)	Yes	State Senator	1946
Oklahoma 3	Wes Watkins (R)	Yes	Air National Guard	1938
Oregon 2	Robert Freeman Smith (R)	No	U.S. Representative (Note: Previously elected in the 98th Congress, serving from 1983 to 1995.)	1931
Oregon 5	Darlene Hooley (D)	Yes	State Representative	1939
Pennsylvania 5	John E. Peterson (R)	No	State Senator	1938
Pennsylvania 16	Joe Pitts (R)	No	State Representative	1939
Rhode Island 2	Robert Weygand (D)	No	Lieutenant Governor of Rhode Island	1948
South Dakota at-large	John Thune (R)	Yes	Legislative aide	1961
Tennessee 1	Bill Jenkins (R)	No	State Representative	1936
Tennessee 9	Harold Ford Jr. (D)	No	Congressional staffer	1970
Texas 1	Max Sandlin (D)	No	County judge	1952
Texas 2	Jim Turner (D)	No	State Senator	1946
Texas 5	Pete Sessions (R)	Yes	Marketing manager	1955
Texas 8	Kevin Brady (R)	No	State Representative	1955
Texas 9	Nick Lampson (D)	Yes	Tax assessor	1945
Texas 12	Kay Granger (R)	Yes	Mayor of Fort Worth	1943
Texas 14	Ron Paul (R)	No	U.S. Representative (Note: Previously elected in the 94th Congress, serving from 1976 to 1977 in the Texas's 22nd congressional district, and elected again in the 96th Congress, serving from 1979 to 1985 in the same 22nd district.)	1935
Texas 15	Rubén Hinojosa (D)	No	State Board of Education	1940
Texas 16	Silvestre Reyes (D)	No	U.S. Border Patrol	1944
Utah 2	Merrill Cook (R)	No	Explosives manufacturer	1946
Utah 3	Chris Cannon (R)	Yes	Venture capitalist	1950
Virginia 5	Virgil Goode (D)	No	State Senator	1946
Washington 9	Adam Smith (D)	Yes	State Senator	1965
Wisconsin 3	Ron Kind (D)	Yes	District attorney	1963
Wisconsin 8	Jay W. Johnson (D)	Yes	Broadcaster	1943

=== Took office during the 105th Congress ===
District	Representative	Took office	Switched party	Prior background	Birth year
New York 13	Vito Fossella (R)	April 11, 1997	No	City Councilor	1965
Texas 28	Ciro Rodriguez (D)	April 12, 1997	No	State Representative	1946
New Mexico 3	Bill Redmond (R)	May 13, 1997	Yes	Chaplain	1955
New York 6	Gregory Meeks (D)	February 3, 1998	No	State Assemblyman	1953
California 22	Lois Capps (D)	March 17, 1998	No	Nurse	1938
California 44	Mary Bono (R)	April 7, 1998	No	Waitress	1961
California 9	Barbara Lee (D)	April 21, 1998	No	State Senator	1946
Pennsylvania 1	Bob Brady (D)	May 19, 1998	No	Professor	1945
New Mexico 1	Heather Wilson (R)	June 25, 1998	No	Air Force Captain	1960

== See also ==
- List of United States representatives in the 105th Congress
- List of United States senators in the 105th Congress

== Notes ==
Preceded by New members of the 104th Congress	New members of the 105th Congress; 1997–1999	Succeeded by New members of the 106th Congress
