= 1996 United States House of Representatives elections in North Carolina =

- November 5, 1996

All 12 North Carolina seats in the United States House of Representatives
	Majority party	Minority party
Party	Republican	Democratic
Last election	8	4
Seats won	6	6
Seat change	▼2	▲2
Popular vote	1,339,515	1,135,731
Percentage	53.29%	45.18%

Republican
40–50%
50–60%
60–70%
70–80%
Democratic
40–50%
50–60%
60–70%
70–80%
80–90%

The United States House of Representative elections of 1996 in North Carolina were held on 5 November 1996 as part of the biennial election to the United States House of Representatives. All twelve seats in North Carolina, and 435 nationwide, were elected.

The Democrats made strong gains, recouping much of the losses sustained in the Republican Revolution of 1994, in which the Republicans had gained four districts. In 1996, parties won six representatives from the state. Two Republican incumbents first elected in 1994 – Fred Heineman in the 4th district and David Funderburk in the 2nd – failed to hold their seats.

It is not to be confused with the election to the North Carolina House of Representatives, which was held on the same day.

== Summary ==
1996 United States House of Representative elections in North Carolina – Summary
Party	Seats	Gains	Losses	Net gain/loss	Seats %	Votes %	Votes	+/−
Republican	6	0	2	–2	50.00	53.29	1,339,515	
Democratic	6	2	0	+2	50.00	45.18	1,135,731	
Libertarian	0	0	0	±0	0	0.92	23,016	
Natural Law	0	0	0	±0	0	0.60	15,189	

== Results ==
1996 United States House of Representatives North Carolina 1st District election
Party	Candidate	Votes	%	±%
Democratic	Eva M. Clayton (incumbent)	108,759	65.90	
Republican	Ted Tyler	54,666	33.13	
Libertarian	Todd Murphrey	1,072	0.65	
Natural Law	Joseph Boxerman	531	0.32	
Turnout		165,028		

1996 United States House of Representatives North Carolina 2nd District election
Party	Candidate	Votes	%	±%
Democratic	Bob Etheridge	113,820	52.54	
Republican	David Funderburk (incumbent)	98,951	45.68	
Libertarian	Mark Jackson	2,892	1.34	
Natural Law	Robert Argy, Jr.	966	0.45	
Turnout		216,629		

1996 United States House of Representatives North Carolina 3rd District election
Party	Candidate	Votes	%	±%
Republican	Walter B. Jones Jr. (incumbent)	118,159	62.66	
Democratic	George Parrott	68,887	36.53	
Natural Law	Edward Downey	1,533	0.81	
Turnout		188,579		

1996 United States House of Representatives North Carolina 4th District election
Party	Candidate	Votes	%	±%
Democratic	David Price	157,194	54.39	
Republican	Fred Heineman (incumbent)	126,466	43.76	
Libertarian	David Allen Walker	4,132	1.43	
Natural Law	Russell Wollman	1,201	0.42	
Turnout		288,993		

1996 United States House of Representatives North Carolina 5th District election
Party	Candidate	Votes	%	±%
Republican	Richard Burr (incumbent)	130,177	62.08	
Democratic	Neil Grist Cashion, Jr.	74,320	35.44	
Libertarian	Barbara Howe	4,193	2.00	
Natural Law	Craig Berg	1,008	0.48	
Turnout		209,698		

1996 United States House of Representatives North Carolina 6th District election
Party	Candidate	Votes	%	±%
Republican	Howard Coble (incumbent)	167,828	73.43	
Democratic	Mark Costley	58,022	25.39	
Libertarian	Gary Goodson	2,693	1.18	
Turnout		228,543		

1996 United States House of Representatives North Carolina 7th District election
Party	Candidate	Votes	%	±%
Democratic	Mike McIntyre	87,487	52.88	
Republican	Bill Caster	75,811	45.82	
Libertarian	Chris Nubel	1,573	0.95	
Natural Law	Garrison King Frantz	569	0.34	
Turnout		165,440		

1996 United States House of Representatives North Carolina 8th District election
Party	Candidate	Votes	%	±%
Democratic	Bill Hefner (incumbent)	103,129	55.18	
Republican	Curtis Blackwood	81,676	43.70	
Natural Law	Thomas W. Carlisle	2,103	1.13	
Turnout		186,908		

1996 United States House of Representatives North Carolina 9th District election
Party	Candidate	Votes	%	±%
Republican	Sue Wilkins Myrick (incumbent)	147,755	62.95	
Democratic	Mike Daisley	83,078	35.40	
Libertarian	David L. Knight	2,280	0.97	
Natural Law	Jeannine Austin	1,499	0.64	
Independent	Gene Gay (write-in)	98	0.04	
Turnout		234,710		

1996 United States House of Representatives North Carolina 10th District election
Party	Candidate	Votes	%	±%
Republican	Cass Ballenger (incumbent)	158,585	69.99	
Democratic	Ben Neill	65,103	28.73	
Natural Law	Richard Kahn	2,909	1.28	
Turnout				

1996 United States House of Representatives North Carolina 11th District election
Party	Candidate	Votes	%	±%
Republican	Charles H. Taylor (incumbent)	132,860	58.27	
Democratic	James Mark Ferguson	91,257	40.02	
Libertarian	Phil McCanless	2,307	1.01	
Natural Law	Milton Burrill	1,601	0.70	
Turnout		228,025		

1996 United States House of Representatives North Carolina 12th District election
Party	Candidate	Votes	%	±%
Democratic	Mel Watt (incumbent)	124,675	71.49	
Republican	Joseph A. Martino, Jr.	46,581	26.71	
Libertarian	Roger L. Kohn	1,874	1.07	
Natural Law	Walter Lewis	1,269	0.73	
Turnout		174,399		
