= List of United States representatives in the 104th Congress =

This is a complete list of United States representatives during the 104th United States Congress listed by seniority.

As an historical article, the districts and party affiliations listed reflect those during the 104th Congress (January 3, 1995 – January 3, 1997). Seats and party affiliations on similar lists for other congresses will be different for certain members.

Seniority depends on the date on which members were sworn into office. Since many members are sworn in on the same day, subsequent ranking is based on previous congressional service of the individual and then by alphabetical order by the last name of the representative.

Committee chairmanship in the House is often associated with seniority. However, party leadership is typically not associated with seniority.

Note: The "*" indicates that the representative/delegate may have served one or more non-consecutive terms while in the House of Representatives of the United States Congress.

== U.S. House seniority list ==
U.S. House seniority
Rank	Representative	Party	District	Seniority date (previous service, if any)	No. of terms	Notes
1	John Dingell	D	MI-16	December 13, 1955	21st term	Dean of the House
2	Henry B. González	D	TX-20	November 4, 1961	18th term	
3	Sam Gibbons	D	FL-11	January 3, 1963	17th term	Left the House in 1997.
4	Joseph M. McDade	R	PA-10	January 3, 1963	17th term	
5	Jimmy Quillen	R	TN-01	January 3, 1963	17th term	Left the House in 1997.
6	Sidney R. Yates	D	IL-09	January 3, 1965; Previous service: 1949–1963.	23rd term*	
7	John Conyers	D	MI-14	January 3, 1965	16th term	
8	Kika de la Garza	D	TX-15	January 3, 1965	16th term	Left the House in 1997.
9	Lee H. Hamilton	D	IN-09	January 3, 1965	16th term	
10	Tom Bevill	D	AL-04	January 3, 1967	15th term	Left the House in 1997.
11	Sonny Montgomery	D	MS-03	January 3, 1967	15th term	Left the House in 1997.
12	John T. Myers	R	IN-07	January 3, 1967	15th term	Left the House in 1997.
13	Bill Clay	D	MO-01	January 3, 1969	14th term	
14	Louis Stokes	D	OH-11	January 3, 1969	14th term	
15	Dave Obey	D	WI-07	April 1, 1969	14th term	
16	Phil Crane	R	IL-08	November 25, 1969	14th term	
17	Bill Archer	R	TX-07	January 3, 1971	13th term	
18	Ron Dellums	D	CA-09	January 3, 1971	13th term	
19	Charles Rangel	D	NY-15	January 3, 1971	13th term	
20	Floyd Spence	R	SC-02	January 3, 1971	13th term	
21	Bill Young	R	FL-10	January 3, 1971	13th term	
22	George Brown Jr.	D	CA-42	January 3, 1973; Previous service: 1963–1971.	16th term*	
23	Benjamin Gilman	R	NY-20	January 3, 1973	12th term	
24	Ralph Regula	R	OH-16	January 3, 1973	12th term	
25	Charlie Rose	D	NC-07	January 3, 1973	12th term	Left the House in 1997.
26	Joe Moakley	D	MA-09	January 3, 1973	12th term	
27	Carlos Moorhead	R	CA-27	January 3, 1973	12th term	Left the House in 1997.
28	Pat Schroeder	D	CO-01	January 3, 1973	12th term	Left the House in 1997.
29	Bud Shuster	R	PA-09	January 3, 1973	12th term	
30	Pete Stark	D	CA-13	January 3, 1973	12th term	
31	Gerry Studds	D	MA-10	January 3, 1973	12th term	Left the House in 1997.
32	Charlie Wilson	D	TX-02	January 3, 1973	12th term	Left the House in 1997.
33	Don Young	R	AK-AL	March 6, 1973	12th term	
34	Cardiss Collins	D	IL-07	June 5, 1973	12th term	Left the House in 1997.
35	John Murtha	D	PA-12	February 5, 1974	12th term	
36	Andrew Jacobs Jr.	D	IN-10	January 3, 1975; Previous service: 1965–1973.	15th term*	Left the House in 1997.
37	Harold Ford Sr.	D	TN-09	January 3, 1975	11th term	Left the House in 1997.
38	William F. Goodling	R	PA-19	January 3, 1975	11th term	
39	Bill Hefner	D	NC-08	January 3, 1975	11th term	
40	Henry Hyde	R	IL-06	January 3, 1975	11th term	
41	John LaFalce	D	NY-29	January 3, 1975	11th term	
42	George Miller	D	CA-07	January 3, 1975	11th term	
43	Norman Mineta	D	CA-15	January 3, 1975	11th term	Resigned on October 10, 1995.
44	Jim Oberstar	D	MN-08	January 3, 1975	11th term	
45	Henry Waxman	D	CA-29	January 3, 1975	11th term	
46	Ed Markey	D	MA-07	November 2, 1976	11th term	
47	Anthony Beilenson	D	CA-24	January 3, 1977	10th term	Left the House in 1997.
48	David Bonior	D	MI-10	January 3, 1977	10th term	
49	Norm Dicks	D	WA-06	January 3, 1977	10th term	
50	Dick Gephardt	D	MO-03	January 3, 1977	10th term	
51	Dale Kildee	D	MI-09	January 3, 1977	10th term	
52	Jim Leach	R	IA-01	January 3, 1977	10th term	
53	Nick Rahall	D	WV-03	January 3, 1977	10th term	
54	Ike Skelton	D	MO-04	January 3, 1977	10th term	
55	Bob Stump	R	AZ-03	January 3, 1977	10th term	
56	Bruce Vento	D	MN-04	January 3, 1977	10th term	
57	Harold Volkmer	D	MO-09	January 3, 1977	10th term	Left the House in 1997.
58	Bob Walker	R	PA-16	January 3, 1977	10th term	Left the House in 1997.
59	Bob Livingston	R	LA-01	August 27, 1977	10th term	
60	Doug Bereuter	R	NE-01	January 3, 1979	9th term	
61	William F. Clinger Jr.	R	PA-05	January 3, 1979	9th term	Left the House in 1997.
62	Julian Dixon	D	CA-32	January 3, 1979	9th term	
63	Vic Fazio	D	CA-03	January 3, 1979	9th term	
64	Martin Frost	D	TX-24	January 3, 1979	9th term	
65	Newt Gingrich	R	GA-06	January 3, 1979	9th term	Speaker of the House
66	Tony P. Hall	D	OH-03	January 3, 1979	9th term	
67	Jerry Lewis	R	CA-40	January 3, 1979	9th term	
68	Bob Matsui	D	CA-05	January 3, 1979	9th term	
69	Toby Roth	R	WI-08	January 3, 1979	9th term	Left the House in 1997.
70	Martin Olav Sabo	D	MN-05	January 3, 1979	9th term	
71	Jim Sensenbrenner	R	WI-09	January 3, 1979	9th term	
72	Gerald Solomon	R	NY-22	January 3, 1979	9th term	
73	Charles Stenholm	D	TX-17	January 3, 1979	9th term	
74	Bill Thomas	R	CA-21	January 3, 1979	9th term	
75	Pat Williams	D	MT-AL	January 3, 1979	9th term	Left the House in 1997.
76	Tom Petri	R	WI-06	April 3, 1979	9th term	
77	John Porter	R	IL-10	January 22, 1980	9th term	
78	Billy Tauzin	D	LA-03	May 22, 1980	9th term	Switched to Republican on August 8, 1995.
79	Thomas J. Bliley Jr.	R	VA-07	January 3, 1981	8th term	
80	William J. Coyne	D	PA-14	January 3, 1981	8th term	
81	David Dreier	R	CA-26	January 3, 1981	8th term	
82	Bill Emerson	R	MO-08	January 3, 1981	8th term	Died on June 22, 1996.
83	Jack Fields	R	TX-08	January 3, 1981	8th term	Left the House in 1997.
84	Thomas M. Foglietta	D	PA-01	January 3, 1981	8th term	
85	Barney Frank	D	MA-04	January 3, 1981	8th term	
86	Sam Gejdenson	D	CT-02	January 3, 1981	8th term	
87	Steve Gunderson	R	WI-03	January 3, 1981	8th term	Left the House in 1997.
88	Ralph Hall	D	TX-04	January 3, 1981	8th term	
89	James V. Hansen	R	UT-01	January 3, 1981	8th term	
90	Duncan L. Hunter	R	CA-52	January 3, 1981	8th term	
91	Tom Lantos	D	CA-12	January 3, 1981	8th term	
92	Bill McCollum	R	FL-08	January 3, 1981	8th term	
93	Pat Roberts	R	KS-01	January 3, 1981	8th term	Left the House in 1997.
94	Hal Rogers	R	KY-05	January 3, 1981	8th term	
95	Marge Roukema	R	NJ-05	January 3, 1981	8th term	
96	Chuck Schumer	D	NY-09	January 3, 1981	8th term	
97	Clay Shaw	R	FL-22	January 3, 1981	8th term	
98	Joe Skeen	R	NM-02	January 3, 1981	8th term	
99	Chris Smith	R	NJ-04	January 3, 1981	8th term	
100	Frank Wolf	R	VA-10	January 3, 1981	8th term	
101	Ron Wyden	D	OR-03	January 3, 1981	8th term	Resigned on February 5, 1996.
102	Steny Hoyer	D	MD-05	May 19, 1981	8th term	
103	Mike Oxley	R	OH-04	June 25, 1981	8th term	
104	Barbara B. Kennelly	D	CT-01	January 12, 1982	8th term	
105	Matthew G. Martínez	D	CA-31	July 13, 1982	8th term	
106	Herbert H. Bateman	R	VA-01	January 3, 1983	7th term	
107	Howard Berman	D	CA-28	January 3, 1983	7th term	
108	Michael Bilirakis	R	FL-09	January 3, 1983	7th term	
109	Sherwood Boehlert	R	NY-23	January 3, 1983	7th term	
110	Robert A. Borski Jr.	D	PA-03	January 3, 1983	7th term	
111	Rick Boucher	D	VA-09	January 3, 1983	7th term	
112	John Bryant	D	TX-05	January 3, 1983	7th term	Left the House in 1997.
113	Dan Burton	R	IN-06	January 3, 1983	7th term	
114	Ronald D. Coleman	D	TX-16	January 3, 1983	7th term	Left the House in 1997.
115	Dick Durbin	D	IL-20	January 3, 1983	7th term	Left the House in 1997.
116	Lane Evans	D	IL-17	January 3, 1983	7th term	
117	George Gekas	R	PA-17	January 3, 1983	7th term	
118	Nancy Johnson	R	CT-06	January 3, 1983	7th term	
119	Marcy Kaptur	D	OH-09	January 3, 1983	7th term	
120	John Kasich	R	OH-12	January 3, 1983	7th term	
121	Sander Levin	D	MI-12	January 3, 1983	7th term	
122	Bill Lipinski	D	IL-03	January 3, 1983	7th term	
123	Alan Mollohan	D	WV-01	January 3, 1983	7th term	
124	Solomon P. Ortiz	D	TX-27	January 3, 1983	7th term	
125	Major Owens	D	NY-11	January 3, 1983	7th term	
126	Ron Packard	R	CA-48	January 3, 1983	7th term	
127	Bill Richardson	D	NM-03	January 3, 1983	7th term	
128	Norman Sisisky	D	VA-04	January 3, 1983	7th term	
129	John Spratt	D	SC-05	January 3, 1983	7th term	
130	Esteban Torres	D	CA-34	January 3, 1983	7th term	
131	Robert Torricelli	D	NJ-09	January 3, 1983	7th term	Left the House in 1997.
132	Edolphus Towns	D	NY-10	January 3, 1983	7th term	
133	Barbara Vucanovich	R	NV-02	January 3, 1983	7th term	Left the House in 1997.
134	Bob Wise	D	WV-02	January 3, 1983	7th term	
135	Gary Ackerman	D	NY-05	March 1, 1983	7th term	
136	Daniel Schaefer	R	CO-06	March 29, 1983	7th term	
137	Jerry Kleczka	D	WI-04	April 3, 1984	7th term	
138	Jim Saxton	R	NJ-03	November 6, 1984	7th term	
139	Bob Dornan	R	CA-46	January 3, 1985; Previous service: 1977–1983.	9th term*	Left the House in 1997.
140	Dick Armey	R	TX-26	January 3, 1985	6th term	
141	Joe Barton	R	TX-06	January 3, 1985	6th term	
142	Sonny Callahan	R	AL-01	January 3, 1985	6th term	
143	Howard Coble	R	NC-06	January 3, 1985	6th term	
144	Larry Combest	R	TX-19	January 3, 1985	6th term	
145	Tom DeLay	R	TX-22	January 3, 1985	6th term	
146	Harris W. Fawell	R	IL-13	January 3, 1985	6th term	
147	Bart Gordon	D	TN-06	January 3, 1985	6th term	
148	Paul Kanjorski	D	PA-11	January 3, 1985	6th term	
149	Jim Kolbe	R	AZ-05	January 3, 1985	6th term	
150	Jim Ross Lightfoot	R	IA-03	January 3, 1985	6th term	Left the House in 1997.
151	Thomas J. Manton	D	NY-07	January 3, 1985	6th term	
152	Jan Meyers	R	KS-03	January 3, 1985	6th term	Left the House in 1997.
153	James Traficant	D	OH-17	January 3, 1985	6th term	
154	Pete Visclosky	D	IN-01	January 3, 1985	6th term	
155	Jim Chapman	D	TX-01	August 3, 1985	6th term	Left the House in 1997.
156	Cass Ballenger	R	NC-10	November 4, 1986	6th term	
157	Richard Baker	R	LA-06	January 3, 1987	5th term	
158	Jim Bunning	R	KY-04	January 3, 1987	5th term	
159	Ben Cardin	D	MD-03	January 3, 1987	5th term	
160	Peter DeFazio	D	OR-04	January 3, 1987	5th term	
161	Floyd Flake	D	NY-06	January 3, 1987	5th term	
162	Elton Gallegly	R	CA-23	January 3, 1987	5th term	
163	Dennis Hastert	R	IL-14	January 3, 1987	5th term	
164	Jimmy Hayes	D	LA-07	January 3, 1987	5th term	Switched to Republican on December 1, 1995. Left the House in 1997.
165	Joel Hefley	R	CO-05	January 3, 1987	5th term	
166	Wally Herger	R	CA-02	January 3, 1987	5th term	
167	Amo Houghton	R	NY-31	January 3, 1987	5th term	
168	Tim Johnson	D	SD-AL	January 3, 1987	5th term	Left the House in 1997.
169	Joseph P. Kennedy II	D	MA-08	January 3, 1987	5th term	
170	John Lewis	D	GA-05	January 3, 1987	5th term	
171	Kweisi Mfume	D	MD-07	January 3, 1987	5th term	Resigned on February 15, 1996
172	Connie Morella	R	MD-08	January 3, 1987	5th term	
173	Owen B. Pickett	D	VA-02	January 3, 1987	5th term	
174	Thomas C. Sawyer	D	OH-14	January 3, 1987	5th term	
175	David Skaggs	D	CO-02	January 3, 1987	5th term	
176	Louise Slaughter	D	NY-28	January 3, 1987	5th term	
177	Lamar Smith	R	TX-21	January 3, 1987	5th term	
178	Fred Upton	R	MI-06	January 3, 1987	5th term	
179	Curt Weldon	R	PA-07	January 3, 1987	5th term	
180	Nancy Pelosi	D	CA-08	June 2, 1987	5th term	
181	Chris Shays	R	CT-04	August 18, 1987	5th term	
182	Bob Clement	D	TN-05	January 19, 1988	5th term	
183	Jim McCrery	R	LA-05	April 16, 1988	5th term	
184	Lewis F. Payne Jr.	D	VA-05	June 14, 1988	5th term	Left the House in 1997.
185	Jerry Costello	D	IL-12	August 9, 1988	5th term	
186	Jimmy Duncan	R	TN-02	November 8, 1988	5th term	
187	Frank Pallone	D	NJ-06	November 8, 1988	5th term	
188	Mel Hancock	R	MO-07	January 3, 1989	4th term	Left the House in 1997.
189	Christopher Cox	R	CA-47	January 3, 1989	4th term	
190	Eliot Engel	D	NY-17	January 3, 1989	4th term	
191	Paul Gillmor	R	OH-05	January 3, 1989	4th term	
192	Porter Goss	R	FL-14	January 3, 1989	4th term	
193	Harry Johnston	D	FL-19	January 3, 1989	4th term	Left the House in 1997.
194	Greg Laughlin	D	TX-14	January 3, 1989	4th term	Switched to Republican on June 26, 1995. Left the House in 1997.
195	Nita Lowey	D	NY-18	January 3, 1989	4th term	
196	Jim McDermott	D	WA-07	January 3, 1989	4th term	
197	Michael R. McNulty	D	NY-21	January 3, 1989	4th term	
198	Richard Neal	D	MA-02	January 3, 1989	4th term	
199	Michael Parker	D	MS-04	January 3, 1989	4th term	Switched to Republican on November 10, 1995.
200	Bill Paxon	R	NY-27	January 3, 1989	4th term	
201	Donald M. Payne	D	NJ-10	January 3, 1989	4th term	
202	Glenn Poshard	D	IL-19	January 3, 1989	4th term	
203	Dana Rohrabacher	R	CA-45	January 3, 1989	4th term	
204	Steven Schiff	R	NM-01	January 3, 1989	4th term	
205	Cliff Stearns	R	FL-06	January 3, 1989	4th term	
206	John S. Tanner	D	TN-08	January 3, 1989	4th term	
207	James T. Walsh	R	NY-25	January 3, 1989	4th term	
208	Glen Browder	D	AL-03	April 4, 1989	4th term	Left the House in 1997.
209	Ileana Ros-Lehtinen	R	FL-18	August 29, 1989	4th term	
210	Gary Condit	D	CA-18	September 12, 1989	4th term	
211	Pete Geren	D	TX-12	September 12, 1989	4th term	Left the House in 1997.
212	Gene Taylor	D	MS-05	October 17, 1989	4th term	
213	Susan Molinari	R	NY-13	March 20, 1990	4th term	
214	José E. Serrano	D	NY-16	March 20, 1990	4th term	
215	Patsy Mink	D	HI-02	September 22, 1990; Previous service: 1965–1977.	10th term*	
216	Rob Andrews	D	NJ-01	November 6, 1990	4th term	
217	Neil Abercrombie	D	HI-01	January 3, 1991; Previous service: 1986–1987.	4th term*	
218	Wayne Allard	R	CO-04	January 3, 1991	3rd term	Left the House in 1997.
219	Bill Barrett	R	NE-03	January 3, 1991	3rd term	
220	John Boehner	R	OH-08	January 3, 1991	3rd term	
221	William K. Brewster	D	OK-03	January 3, 1991	3rd term	Left the House in 1997.
222	Barbara-Rose Collins	D	MI-15	January 3, 1991	3rd term	Left the House in 1997.
223	Dave Camp	R	MI-04	January 3, 1991	3rd term	
224	Bud Cramer	D	AL-05	January 3, 1991	3rd term	
225	Duke Cunningham	R	CA-50	January 3, 1991	3rd term	
226	Rosa DeLauro	D	CT-03	January 3, 1991	3rd term	
227	John Doolittle	R	CA-04	January 3, 1991	3rd term	
228	Cal Dooley	D	CA-20	January 3, 1991	3rd term	
229	Chet Edwards	D	TX-11	January 3, 1991	3rd term	
230	Gary Franks	R	CT-05	January 3, 1991	3rd term	Left the House in 1997.
231	Wayne Gilchrest	R	MD-01	January 3, 1991	3rd term	
232	Dave Hobson	R	OH-07	January 3, 1991	3rd term	
233	William J. Jefferson	D	LA-02	January 3, 1991	3rd term	
234	Scott L. Klug	R	WI-02	January 3, 1991	3rd term	
235	Jim Moran	D	VA-08	January 3, 1991	3rd term	
236	Jim Nussle	R	IA-02	January 3, 1991	3rd term	
237	Bill Orton	D	UT-03	January 3, 1991	3rd term	Left the House in 1997.
238	Collin Peterson	D	MN-07	January 3, 1991	3rd term	
239	Pete Peterson	D	FL-02	January 3, 1991	3rd term	Left the House in 1997.
240	Jim Ramstad	R	MN-03	January 3, 1991	3rd term	
241	Jack Reed	D	RI-02	January 3, 1991	3rd term	Left the House in 1997.
242	Tim Roemer	D	IN-03	January 3, 1991	3rd term	
243	Bernie Sanders	I	VT-AL	January 3, 1991	3rd term	
244	Charles H. Taylor	R	NC-11	January 3, 1991	3rd term	
245	Ray Thornton	D	AR-02	January 3, 1991; Previous service: 1973–1979.	6th term*	Resigned on January 1, 1997.
246	Maxine Waters	D	CA-35	January 3, 1991	3rd term	
247	Bill Zeliff	R	NH-01	January 3, 1991	3rd term	Left the House in 1997.
248	Dick Zimmer	R	NJ-12	January 3, 1991	3rd term	Left the House in 1997.
249	Sam Johnson	R	TX-03	May 8, 1991	3rd term	
250	John Olver	D	MA-01	June 18, 1991	3rd term	
251	Thomas W. Ewing	R	IL-15	July 2, 1991	3rd term	
252	Ed Pastor	D	AZ-02	October 3, 1991	3rd term	
253	Eva Clayton	D	NC-01	November 3, 1992	3rd term	
254	Jerry Nadler	D	NY-08	November 3, 1992	3rd term	
255	Spencer Bachus	R	AL-06	January 3, 1993	2nd term	
256	William P. Baker	R	CA-10	January 3, 1993	2nd term	Left the House in 1997.
257	James A. Barcia	D	MI-05	January 3, 1993	2nd term	
258	Tom Barrett	D	WI-05	January 3, 1993	2nd term	
259	Roscoe Bartlett	R	MD-06	January 3, 1993	2nd term	
260	Xavier Becerra	D	CA-30	January 3, 1993	2nd term	
261	Scotty Baesler	D	KY-06	January 3, 1993	2nd term	
262	Sanford Bishop	D	GA-02	January 3, 1993	2nd term	
263	Peter I. Blute	R	MA-03	January 3, 1993	2nd term	Left the House in 1997.
264	Henry Bonilla	R	TX-23	January 3, 1993	2nd term	
265	Corrine Brown	D	FL-03	January 3, 1993	2nd term	
266	Sherrod Brown	D	OH-13	January 3, 1993	2nd term	
267	Steve Buyer	R	IN-05	January 3, 1993	2nd term	
268	Charles T. Canady	R	FL-12	January 3, 1993	2nd term	
269	Ken Calvert	R	CA-43	January 3, 1993	2nd term	
270	Mike Castle	R	DE-AL	January 3, 1993	2nd term	
271	Jim Clyburn	D	SC-06	January 3, 1993	2nd term	
272	Mac Collins	R	GA-03	January 3, 1993	2nd term	
273	Mike Crapo	R	ID-02	January 3, 1993	2nd term	
274	Pat Danner	D	MO-06	January 3, 1993	2nd term	
275	Nathan Deal	D	GA-09	January 3, 1993	2nd term	Switched to Republican on April 11, 1995.
276	Peter Deutsch	D	FL-20	January 3, 1993	2nd term	
277	Lincoln Díaz-Balart	R	FL-21	January 3, 1993	2nd term	
278	Jay Dickey	R	AR-04	January 3, 1993	2nd term	
279	Jennifer Dunn	R	WA-08	January 3, 1993	2nd term	
280	Anna Eshoo	D	CA-14	January 3, 1993	2nd term	
281	Terry Everett	R	AL-02	January 3, 1993	2nd term	
282	Cleo Fields	D	LA-04	January 3, 1993	2nd term	Left the House in 1997.
283	Bob Filner	D	CA-51	January 3, 1993	2nd term	
284	Tillie Fowler	R	FL-04	January 3, 1993	2nd term	
285	Bob Franks	R	NJ-07	January 3, 1993	2nd term	
286	Elizabeth Furse	D	OR-01	January 3, 1993	2nd term	
287	Bob Goodlatte	R	VA-06	January 3, 1993	2nd term	
288	Gene Green	D	TX-29	January 3, 1993	2nd term	
289	James C. Greenwood	R	PA-08	January 3, 1993	2nd term	
290	Luis Gutiérrez	D	IL-04	January 3, 1993	2nd term	
291	Jane Harman	D	CA-36	January 3, 1993	2nd term	
292	Alcee Hastings	D	FL-23	January 3, 1993	2nd term	
293	Earl Hilliard	D	AL-07	January 3, 1993	2nd term	
294	Maurice Hinchey	D	NY-26	January 3, 1993	2nd term	
295	Pete Hoekstra	R	MI-02	January 3, 1993	2nd term	
296	Martin Hoke	R	OH-10	January 3, 1993	2nd term	Left the House in 1997.
297	Tim Holden	D	PA-06	January 3, 1993	2nd term	
298	Steve Horn	R	CA-38	January 3, 1993	2nd term	
299	Bob Inglis	R	SC-04	January 3, 1993	2nd term	
300	Ernest Istook	R	OK-05	January 3, 1993	2nd term	
301	Eddie Bernice Johnson	D	TX-30	January 3, 1993	2nd term	
302	Tim Hutchinson	R	AR-03	January 3, 1993	2nd term	Left the House in 1997.
303	Jay Kim	R	CA-41	January 3, 1993	2nd term	
304	Peter T. King	R	NY-03	January 3, 1993	2nd term	
305	Jack Kingston	R	GA-01	January 3, 1993	2nd term	
306	Ron Klink	D	PA-04	January 3, 1993	2nd term	
307	Joe Knollenberg	R	MI-11	January 3, 1993	2nd term	
308	Rick Lazio	R	NY-02	January 3, 1993	2nd term	
309	Blanche Lincoln	D	AR-01	January 3, 1993	2nd term	Left the House in 1997.
310	John Linder	R	GA-11	January 3, 1993	2nd term	
311	Carolyn Maloney	D	NY-14	January 3, 1993	2nd term	
312	Don Manzullo	R	IL-16	January 3, 1993	2nd term	
313	Paul McHale	D	PA-15	January 3, 1993	2nd term	
314	John M. McHugh	R	NY-24	January 3, 1993	2nd term	
315	Scott McInnis	R	CO-03	January 3, 1993	2nd term	
316	Buck McKeon	R	CA-25	January 3, 1993	2nd term	
317	Cynthia McKinney	D	GA-04	January 3, 1993	2nd term	
318	Marty Meehan	D	MA-05	January 3, 1993	2nd term	
319	Carrie Meek	D	FL-17	January 3, 1993	2nd term	
320	Bob Menendez	D	NJ-13	January 3, 1993	2nd term	
321	John Mica	R	FL-07	January 3, 1993	2nd term	
322	Dan Miller	R	FL-13	January 3, 1993	2nd term	
323	David Minge	D	MN-02	January 3, 1993	2nd term	
324	Richard Pombo	R	CA-11	January 3, 1993	2nd term	
325	Earl Pomeroy	D	ND-AL	January 3, 1993	2nd term	
326	Deborah Pryce	R	OH-15	January 3, 1993	2nd term	
327	Jack Quinn	R	NY-30	January 3, 1993	2nd term	
328	Mel Reynolds	D	IL-02	January 3, 1993	2nd term	Resigned on October 1, 1995.
329	Lucille Roybal-Allard	D	CA-33	January 3, 1993	2nd term	
330	Ed Royce	R	CA-39	January 3, 1993	2nd term	
331	Bobby Rush	D	IL-01	January 3, 1993	2nd term	
332	Bobby Scott	D	VA-03	January 3, 1993	2nd term	
333	Nick Smith	R	MI-07	January 3, 1993	2nd term	
334	Bart Stupak	D	MI-01	January 3, 1993	2nd term	
335	Frank Tejeda	D	TX-28	January 3, 1993	2nd term	
336	Jim Talent	R	MO-02	January 3, 1993	2nd term	
337	Karen Thurman	D	FL-05	January 3, 1993	2nd term	
338	Peter G. Torkildsen	R	MA-06	January 3, 1993	2nd term	Left the House in 1997.
339	Walter R. Tucker III	D	CA-37	January 3, 1993	2nd term	Resigned on December 15, 1995.
340	Nydia Velázquez	D	NY-12	January 3, 1993	2nd term	
341	Mel Watt	D	NC-12	January 3, 1993	2nd term	
342	Lynn Woolsey	D	CA-06	January 3, 1993	2nd term	
343	Albert Wynn	D	MD-04	January 3, 1993	2nd term	
344	Bennie Thompson	D	MS-02	April 13, 1993	2nd term	
345	Rob Portman	R	OH-02	May 4, 1993	2nd term	
346	Sam Farr	D	CA-17	June 8, 1993	2nd term	
347	Vern Ehlers	R	MI-03	December 7, 1993	2nd term	
348	Frank Lucas	R	OK-06	May 10, 1994	2nd term	
349	Ron Lewis	R	KY-02	May 24, 1994	2nd term	
350	Steve Largent	R	OK-01	November 29, 1994	2nd term	
351	John Baldacci	D	ME-02	January 3, 1995	1st term	
352	Charles Bass	R	NH-02	January 3, 1995	1st term	
353	Bob Barr	R	GA-07	January 3, 1995	1st term	
354	Ken Bentsen Jr.	D	TX-25	January 3, 1995	1st term	
355	Brian Bilbray	R	CA-49	January 3, 1995	1st term	
356	Sonny Bono	R	CA-44	January 3, 1995	1st term	
357	Sam Brownback	R	KS-02	January 3, 1995	1st term	Resigned on November 7, 1996.
358	Ed Bryant	R	TN-07	January 3, 1995	1st term	
359	Richard Burr	R	NC-05	January 3, 1995	1st term	
360	Jim Bunn	R	OR-05	January 3, 1995	1st term	Left the House in 1997.
361	Steve Chabot	R	OH-01	January 3, 1995	1st term	
362	Saxby Chambliss	R	GA-08	January 3, 1995	1st term	
363	Helen Chenoweth	R	ID-01	January 3, 1995	1st term	
364	Jon Christensen	R	NE-02	January 3, 1995	1st term	
365	Dick Chrysler	R	MI-08	January 3, 1995	1st term	Left the House in 1997.
366	Tom Coburn	R	OK-02	January 3, 1995	1st term	
367	Wes Cooley	R	OR-02	January 3, 1995	1st term	Left the House in 1997.
368	Frank Cremeans	R	OH-06	January 3, 1995	1st term	Left the House in 1997.
369	Barbara Cubin	R	WY-AL	January 3, 1995	1st term	
370	Tom Davis	R	VA-11	January 3, 1995	1st term	
371	Lloyd Doggett	D	TX-10	January 3, 1995	1st term	
372	Mike Doyle	D	PA-18	January 3, 1995	1st term	
373	Bob Ehrlich	R	MD-02	January 3, 1995	1st term	
374	Phil English	R	PA-21	January 3, 1995	1st term	
375	John Ensign	R	NV-01	January 3, 1995	1st term	
376	Chaka Fattah	D	PA-02	January 3, 1995	1st term	
377	Michael Flanagan	R	IL-05	January 3, 1995	1st term	Left the House in 1997.
378	Mark Foley	R	FL-16	January 3, 1995	1st term	
379	Michael Forbes	R	NY-01	January 3, 1995	1st term	
380	Jon D. Fox	R	PA-13	January 3, 1995	1st term	
381	Rodney Frelinghuysen	R	NJ-11	January 3, 1995	1st term	
382	Dan Frisa	R	NY-04	January 3, 1995	1st term	Left the House in 1997.
383	David Funderburk	R	NC-02	January 3, 1995	1st term	Left the House in 1997.
384	Greg Ganske	R	IA-04	January 3, 1995	1st term	
385	Lindsey Graham	R	SC-03	January 3, 1995	1st term	
386	Enid Greene Waldholtz	R	UT-02	January 3, 1995	1st term	Left the House in 1997.
387	Gil Gutknecht	R	MN-01	January 3, 1995	1st term	
388	Doc Hastings	R	WA-04	January 3, 1995	1st term	
389	J. D. Hayworth	R	AZ-06	January 3, 1995	1st term	
390	Fred Heineman	R	NC-04	January 3, 1995	1st term	Left the House in 1997.
391	Van Hilleary	R	TN-04	January 3, 1995	1st term	
392	John Hostettler	R	IN-08	January 3, 1995	1st term	
393	Sheila Jackson Lee	D	TX-18	January 3, 1995	1st term	
394	Walter B. Jones Jr.	R	NC-03	January 3, 1995	1st term	
395	Sue W. Kelly	R	NY-19	January 3, 1995	1st term	
396	Patrick J. Kennedy	D	RI-01	January 3, 1995	1st term	
397	Ray LaHood	R	IL-18	January 3, 1995	1st term	
398	Tom Latham	R	IA-05	January 3, 1995	1st term	
399	Steve LaTourette	R	OH-19	January 3, 1995	1st term	
400	Frank LoBiondo	R	NJ-02	January 3, 1995	1st term	
401	Zoe Lofgren	D	CA-16	January 3, 1995	1st term	
402	James B. Longley Jr.	R	ME-01	January 3, 1995	1st term	Left the House in 1997.
403	Bill Luther	D	MN-06	January 3, 1995	1st term	
404	William J. Martini	R	NJ-08	January 3, 1995	1st term	Left the House in 1997.
405	Frank Mascara	D	PA-20	January 3, 1995	1st term	
406	Karen McCarthy	D	MO-05	January 3, 1995	1st term	
407	David M. McIntosh	R	IN-02	January 3, 1995	1st term	
408	Jack Metcalf	R	WA-02	January 3, 1995	1st term	
409	Sue Myrick	R	NC-09	January 3, 1995	1st term	
410	George Nethercutt	R	WA-05	January 3, 1995	1st term	
411	Mark Neumann	R	WI-01	January 3, 1995	1st term	
412	Bob Ney	R	OH-18	January 3, 1995	1st term	
413	Charlie Norwood	R	GA-10	January 3, 1995	1st term	
414	George Radanovich	R	CA-19	January 3, 1995	1st term	
415	Frank Riggs	R	CA-01	January 3, 1995; Previous service: 1991–1993.	2nd term*	
416	Lynn N. Rivers	D	MI-13	January 3, 1995	1st term	
417	Matt Salmon	R	AZ-01	January 3, 1995	1st term	
418	Mark Sanford	R	SC-01	January 3, 1995	1st term	
419	Joe Scarborough	R	FL-01	January 3, 1995	1st term	
420	Andrea Seastrand	R	CA-22	January 3, 1995	1st term	Left the House in 1997.
421	John Shadegg	R	AZ-04	January 3, 1995	1st term	
422	Linda Smith	R	WA-03	January 3, 1995	1st term	
423	Mark Souder	R	IN-04	January 3, 1995	1st term	
424	Steve Stockman	R	TX-09	January 3, 1995	1st term	Left the House in 1997.
425	Randy Tate	R	WA-09	January 3, 1995	1st term	Left the House in 1997.
426	Mac Thornberry	R	TX-13	January 3, 1995	1st term	
427	Todd Tiahrt	R	KS-04	January 3, 1995	1st term	
428	Zach Wamp	R	TN-03	January 3, 1995	1st term	
429	Mike Ward	D	KY-03	January 3, 1995	1st term	Left the House in 1997.
430	J. C. Watts	R	OK-04	January 3, 1995	1st term	
431	Dave Weldon	R	FL-15	January 3, 1995	1st term	
432	Jerry Weller	R	IL-11	January 3, 1995	1st term	
433	Rick White	R	WA-01	January 3, 1995	1st term	
434	Ed Whitfield	R	KY-01	January 3, 1995	1st term	
435	Roger Wicker	R	MS-01	January 3, 1995	1st term	
	Tom Campbell	R	CA-15	December 12, 1995; Previous service: 1989–1993.	3rd term*	
	Jesse Jackson Jr.	D	IL-02	December 12, 1995	1st term	
	Juanita Millender-McDonald	D	CA-37	March 26, 1996	1st term	
	Elijah Cummings	D	MD-07	April 16, 1996	1st term	
	Earl Blumenauer	D	OR-03	May 21, 1996	1st term	
	Jo Ann Emerson	R	MO-08	November 5, 1996	1st term	
	Jim Ryun	R	KS-02	November 27, 1996	1st term	

== Delegates ==
Rank	Delegate	Party	District	Seniority date (previous service, if any)	No. of terms	Notes
1	Eni Faleomavaega	D	AS	January 3, 1989	4th term	
2	Eleanor Holmes Norton	D	DC	January 3, 1991	3rd term	
3	Carlos Romero Barceló	D	PR	January 3, 1993	2nd term	
4	Robert A. Underwood	D	GU	January 3, 1993	2nd term	
5	Victor O. Frazer	D	VI	January 3, 1995	1st term	

== See also ==
- 104th United States Congress
- List of United States congressional districts
- List of United States senators in the 104th Congress
