= List of United States representatives in the 105th Congress =

This is a complete list of United States representatives during the 105th United States Congress listed by seniority.

As a historical article, the districts and party affiliations listed reflect those during the 105th Congress (January 3, 1997 – January 3, 1999). Seats and party affiliations on similar lists for other congresses will be different for certain members.

Seniority depends on the date on which members were sworn into office. Since many members are sworn in on the same day, subsequent ranking is based on previous congressional service of the individual and then by alphabetical order by the last name of the representative.

Committee chairmanship in the House is often associated with seniority. However, party leadership is typically not associated with seniority.

Note: The "*" indicates that the representative/delegate may have served one or more non-consecutive terms while in the House of Representatives of the United States Congress.

== U.S. House seniority list ==
U.S. House seniority
Rank	Representative	Party	District	Seniority date (previous service, if any)	No. of term(s)	Notes
1	John Dingell	D	MI-16	December 13, 1955	22nd term	
2	Henry B. González	D	TX-20	November 4, 1961	19th term	Left the House in 1999.
3	Joseph M. McDade	R	PA-10	January 3, 1963	18th term	Left the House in 1999.
4	Sidney R. Yates	D	IL-09	January 3, 1965; Previous service, 1949–1963.	24th term*	Left the House in 1999.
5	John Conyers	D	MI-14	January 3, 1965	17th term	
6	Lee H. Hamilton	D	IN-09	January 3, 1965	17th term	Left the House in 1999.
7	Bill Clay	D	MO-01	January 3, 1969	15th term	
8	Louis Stokes	D	OH-11	January 3, 1969	15th term	Left the House in 1999.
9	Dave Obey	D	WI-07	April 1, 1969	15th term	
10	Phil Crane	R	IL-08	November 25, 1969	15th term	
11	Bill Archer	R	TX-07	January 3, 1971	14th term	
12	Ron Dellums	D	CA-09	January 3, 1971	14th term	Resigned on February 6, 1998.
13	Charles Rangel	D	NY-15	January 3, 1971	14th term	
14	Floyd Spence	R	SC-02	January 3, 1971	14th term	
15	Bill Young	R	FL-10	January 3, 1971	14th term	
16	George Brown Jr.	D	CA-42	January 3, 1973; Previous service, 1963–1971.	17th term*	
17	Benjamin Gilman	R	NY-20	January 3, 1973	13th term	
18	Ralph Regula	R	OH-16	January 3, 1973	13th term	
19	Bud Shuster	R	PA-09	January 3, 1973	13th term	
20	Joe Moakley	D	MA-09	January 3, 1973	13th term	
21	Pete Stark	D	CA-13	January 3, 1973	13th term	
22	Don Young	R	AK-AL	March 6, 1973	13th term	
23	John Murtha	D	PA-12	February 5, 1974	13th term	
24	William F. Goodling	R	PA-19	January 3, 1975	12th term	
25	Bill Hefner	D	NC-08	January 3, 1975	12th term	Left the House in 1999.
26	Henry Hyde	R	IL-06	January 3, 1975	12th term	
27	John LaFalce	D	NY-29	January 3, 1975	12th term	
28	George Miller	D	CA-07	January 3, 1975	12th term	
29	Jim Oberstar	D	MN-08	January 3, 1975	12th term	
30	Henry Waxman	D	CA-29	January 3, 1975	12th term	
31	Ed Markey	D	MA-07	November 2, 1976	12th term	
32	David Bonior	D	MI-10	January 3, 1977	11th term	
33	Norm Dicks	D	WA-06	January 3, 1977	11th term	
34	Dick Gephardt	D	MO-03	January 3, 1977	11th term	
35	Dale Kildee	D	MI-09	January 3, 1977	11th term	
36	Jim Leach	R	IA-01	January 3, 1977	11th term	
37	Nick Rahall	D	WV-03	January 3, 1977	11th term	
38	Ike Skelton	D	MO-04	January 3, 1977	11th term	
39	Bob Stump	R	AZ-03	January 3, 1977	11th term	
40	Bruce Vento	D	MN-04	January 3, 1977	11th term	
41	Bob Livingston	R	LA-01	August 27, 1977	11th term	
42	Doug Bereuter	R	NE-01	January 3, 1979	10th term	
43	Julian Dixon	D	CA-32	January 3, 1979	10th term	
44	Vic Fazio	D	CA-03	January 3, 1979	10th term	Left the House in 1999.
45	Martin Frost	D	TX-24	January 3, 1979	10th term	
46	Newt Gingrich	R	GA-06	January 3, 1979	10th term	Speaker of the House; Resigned on January 3, 1999.
47	Tony P. Hall	D	OH-03	January 3, 1979	10th term	
48	Jerry Lewis	R	CA-40	January 3, 1979	10th term	
49	Bob Matsui	D	CA-05	January 3, 1979	10th term	
50	Martin Olav Sabo	D	MN-05	January 3, 1979	10th term	
51	Jim Sensenbrenner	R	WI-09	January 3, 1979	10th term	
52	Gerald Solomon	R	NY-22	January 3, 1979	10th term	Left the House in 1999.
53	Charles Stenholm	D	TX-17	January 3, 1979	10th term	
54	Bill Thomas	R	CA-21	January 3, 1979	10th term	
55	Tom Petri	R	WI-06	April 3, 1979	10th term	
56	John Porter	R	IL-10	January 22, 1980	10th term	
57	Billy Tauzin	R	LA-03	May 22, 1980	10th term	
58	Thomas J. Bliley Jr.	R	VA-07	January 3, 1981	9th term	
59	William J. Coyne	D	PA-14	January 3, 1981	9th term	
60	David Dreier	R	CA-26	January 3, 1981	9th term	
61	Thomas M. Foglietta	D	PA-01	January 3, 1981	9th term	Resigned on November 11, 1997.
62	Barney Frank	D	MA-04	January 3, 1981	9th term	
63	Sam Gejdenson	D	CT-02	January 3, 1981	9th term	
64	Ralph Hall	D	TX-04	January 3, 1981	9th term	
65	James V. Hansen	R	UT-01	January 3, 1981	9th term	
66	Duncan L. Hunter	R	CA-52	January 3, 1981	9th term	
67	Tom Lantos	D	CA-12	January 3, 1981	9th term	
68	Bill McCollum	R	FL-08	January 3, 1981	9th term	
69	Hal Rogers	R	KY-05	January 3, 1981	9th term	
70	Marge Roukema	R	NJ-05	January 3, 1981	9th term	
71	Chuck Schumer	D	NY-09	January 3, 1981	9th term	Left the House in 1999.
72	Clay Shaw	R	FL-22	January 3, 1981	9th term	
73	Joe Skeen	R	NM-02	January 3, 1981	9th term	
74	Chris Smith	R	NJ-04	January 3, 1981	9th term	
75	Frank Wolf	R	VA-10	January 3, 1981	9th term	
76	Steny Hoyer	D	MD-05	May 19, 1981	9th term	
77	Mike Oxley	R	OH-04	June 25, 1981	9th term	
78	Barbara B. Kennelly	D	CT-01	January 12, 1982	9th term	Left the House in 1999.
79	Matthew G. Martínez	D	CA-31	July 13, 1982	9th term	
80	Herbert H. Bateman	R	VA-01	January 3, 1983	8th term	
81	Howard Berman	D	CA-28	January 3, 1983	8th term	
82	Michael Bilirakis	R	FL-09	January 3, 1983	8th term	
83	Sherwood Boehlert	R	NY-23	January 3, 1983	8th term	
84	Robert A. Borski Jr.	D	PA-03	January 3, 1983	8th term	
85	Rick Boucher	D	VA-09	January 3, 1983	8th term	
86	Dan Burton	R	IN-06	January 3, 1983	8th term	
87	Lane Evans	D	IL-17	January 3, 1983	8th term	
88	George Gekas	R	PA-17	January 3, 1983	8th term	
89	Nancy Johnson	R	CT-06	January 3, 1983	8th term	
90	Marcy Kaptur	D	OH-09	January 3, 1983	8th term	
91	John Kasich	R	OH-12	January 3, 1983	8th term	
92	Sander Levin	D	MI-12	January 3, 1983	8th term	
93	Bill Lipinski	D	IL-03	January 3, 1983	8th term	
94	Alan Mollohan	D	WV-01	January 3, 1983	8th term	
95	Solomon P. Ortiz	D	TX-27	January 3, 1983	8th term	
96	Major Owens	D	NY-11	January 3, 1983	8th term	
97	Ron Packard	R	CA-48	January 3, 1983	8th term	
98	Bill Richardson	D	NM-03	January 3, 1983	8th term	Resigned on February 13, 1997.
99	Norman Sisisky	D	VA-04	January 3, 1983	8th term	
100	John Spratt	D	SC-05	January 3, 1983	8th term	
101	Esteban Torres	D	CA-34	January 3, 1983	8th term	Left the House in 1999.
102	Edolphus Towns	D	NY-10	January 3, 1983	8th term	
103	Bob Wise	D	WV-02	January 3, 1983	8th term	
104	Gary Ackerman	D	NY-05	March 1, 1983	8th term	
105	Daniel Schaefer	R	CO-06	March 29, 1983	8th term	Left the House in 1999.
106	Jerry Kleczka	D	WI-04	April 3, 1984	8th term	
107	Jim Saxton	R	NJ-03	November 6, 1984	8th term	
108	Dick Armey	R	TX-26	January 3, 1985	7th term	
109	Joe Barton	R	TX-06	January 3, 1985	7th term	
110	Sonny Callahan	R	AL-01	January 3, 1985	7th term	
111	Howard Coble	R	NC-06	January 3, 1985	7th term	
112	Larry Combest	R	TX-19	January 3, 1985	7th term	
113	Tom DeLay	R	TX-22	January 3, 1985	7th term	
114	Harris W. Fawell	R	IL-13	January 3, 1985	7th term	Left the House in 1999.
115	Bart Gordon	D	TN-06	January 3, 1985	7th term	
116	Paul Kanjorski	D	PA-11	January 3, 1985	7th term	
117	Jim Kolbe	R	AZ-05	January 3, 1985	7th term	
118	Thomas J. Manton	D	NY-07	January 3, 1985	7th term	Left the House in 1999.
119	James Traficant	D	OH-17	January 3, 1985	7th term	
120	Pete Visclosky	D	IN-01	January 3, 1985	7th term	
121	Cass Ballenger	R	NC-10	November 4, 1986	7th term	
122	Richard Baker	R	LA-06	January 3, 1987	6th term	
123	Jim Bunning	R	KY-04	January 3, 1987	6th term	Left the House in 1999.
124	Ben Cardin	D	MD-03	January 3, 1987	6th term	
125	Peter DeFazio	D	OR-04	January 3, 1987	6th term	
126	Floyd Flake	D	NY-06	January 3, 1987	6th term	Resigned on November 17, 1997.
127	Elton Gallegly	R	CA-23	January 3, 1987	6th term	
128	Dennis Hastert	R	IL-14	January 3, 1987	6th term	
129	Joel Hefley	R	CO-05	January 3, 1987	6th term	
130	Wally Herger	R	CA-02	January 3, 1987	6th term	
131	Amo Houghton	R	NY-31	January 3, 1987	6th term	
132	Joseph P. Kennedy II	D	MA-08	January 3, 1987	6th term	Left the House in 1999.
133	John Lewis	D	GA-05	January 3, 1987	6th term	
134	Connie Morella	R	MD-08	January 3, 1987	6th term	
135	Owen B. Pickett	D	VA-02	January 3, 1987	6th term	
136	Thomas C. Sawyer	D	OH-14	January 3, 1987	6th term	
137	David Skaggs	D	CO-02	January 3, 1987	6th term	Left the House in 1999.
138	Louise Slaughter	D	NY-28	January 3, 1987	6th term	
139	Lamar Smith	R	TX-21	January 3, 1987	6th term	
140	Fred Upton	R	MI-06	January 3, 1987	6th term	
141	Curt Weldon	R	PA-07	January 3, 1987	6th term	
142	Nancy Pelosi	D	CA-08	June 2, 1987	6th term	
143	Chris Shays	R	CT-04	August 18, 1987	6th term	
144	Bob Clement	D	TN-05	January 19, 1988	6th term	
145	Jim McCrery	R	LA-04	April 16, 1988	6th term	
146	Jerry Costello	D	IL-12	August 9, 1988	6th term	
147	Jimmy Duncan	R	TN-02	November 8, 1988	6th term	
148	Frank Pallone	D	NJ-06	November 8, 1988	6th term	
149	Christopher Cox	R	CA-47	January 3, 1989	5th term	
150	Eliot Engel	D	NY-17	January 3, 1989	5th term	
151	Paul Gillmor	R	OH-05	January 3, 1989	5th term	
152	Porter Goss	R	FL-14	January 3, 1989	5th term	
153	Nita Lowey	D	NY-18	January 3, 1989	5th term	
154	Jim McDermott	D	WA-07	January 3, 1989	5th term	
155	Michael R. McNulty	D	NY-21	January 3, 1989	5th term	
156	Richard Neal	D	MA-02	January 3, 1989	5th term	
157	Michael Parker	R	MS-04	January 3, 1989	5th term	Left the House in 1999.
158	Bill Paxon	R	NY-27	January 3, 1989	5th term	Left the House in 1999.
159	Donald M. Payne	D	NJ-10	January 3, 1989	5th term	
160	Glenn Poshard	D	IL-19	January 3, 1989	5th term	Left the House in 1999.
161	Dana Rohrabacher	R	CA-45	January 3, 1989	5th term	
162	Steven Schiff	R	NM-01	January 3, 1989	5th term	Died on March 25, 1998.
163	Cliff Stearns	R	FL-06	January 3, 1989	5th term	
164	John S. Tanner	D	TN-08	January 3, 1989	5th term	
165	James T. Walsh	R	NY-25	January 3, 1989	5th term	
166	Ileana Ros-Lehtinen	R	FL-18	August 29, 1989	5th term	
167	Gary Condit	D	CA-18	September 12, 1989	5th term	
168	Gene Taylor	D	MS-05	October 17, 1989	5th term	
169	Susan Molinari	R	NY-13	March 20, 1990	5th term	Resigned on August 2, 1997.
170	José E. Serrano	D	NY-16	March 20, 1990	5th term	
171	Patsy Mink	D	HI-02	September 22, 1990; Previous service, 1965–1977.	11th term*	
172	Rob Andrews	D	NJ-01	November 6, 1990	5th term	
173	Neil Abercrombie	D	HI-01	January 3, 1991; Previous service, 1986–1987.	5th term*	
174	Bill Barrett	R	NE-03	January 3, 1991	4th term	
175	John Boehner	R	OH-08	January 3, 1991	4th term	
176	Dave Camp	R	MI-04	January 3, 1991	4th term	
177	Bud Cramer	D	AL-05	January 3, 1991	4th term	
178	Duke Cunningham	R	CA-50	January 3, 1991	4th term	
179	Rosa DeLauro	D	CT-03	January 3, 1991	4th term	
180	John Doolittle	R	CA-04	January 3, 1991	4th term	
181	Cal Dooley	D	CA-20	January 3, 1991	4th term	
182	Chet Edwards	D	TX-11	January 3, 1991	4th term	
183	Wayne Gilchrest	R	MD-01	January 3, 1991	4th term	
184	Dave Hobson	R	OH-07	January 3, 1991	4th term	
185	William J. Jefferson	D	LA-02	January 3, 1991	4th term	
186	Scott L. Klug	R	WI-02	January 3, 1991	4th term	Left the House in 1999.
187	Jim Moran	D	VA-08	January 3, 1991	4th term	
188	Jim Nussle	R	IA-02	January 3, 1991	4th term	
189	Collin Peterson	D	MN-07	January 3, 1991	4th term	
190	Jim Ramstad	R	MN-03	January 3, 1991	4th term	
191	Tim Roemer	D	IN-03	January 3, 1991	4th term	
192	Bernie Sanders	I	VT-AL	January 3, 1991	4th term	
193	Charles H. Taylor	R	NC-11	January 3, 1991	4th term	
194	Maxine Waters	D	CA-35	January 3, 1991	4th term	
195	Sam Johnson	R	TX-03	May 8, 1991	4th term	
196	John Olver	D	MA-01	June 18, 1991	4th term	
197	Thomas W. Ewing	R	IL-15	July 2, 1991	4th term	
198	Ed Pastor	D	AZ-02	October 3, 1991	4th term	
199	Eva Clayton	D	NC-01	November 3, 1992	4th term	
200	Jerry Nadler	D	NY-08	November 3, 1992	4th term	
201	Spencer Bachus	R	AL-06	January 3, 1993	3rd term	
202	James A. Barcia	D	MI-05	January 3, 1993	3rd term	
203	Tom Barrett	D	WI-05	January 3, 1993	3rd term	
204	Roscoe Bartlett	R	MD-06	January 3, 1993	3rd term	
205	Xavier Becerra	D	CA-30	January 3, 1993	3rd term	
206	Scotty Baesler	D	KY-06	January 3, 1993	3rd term	Left the House in 1999.
207	Sanford Bishop	D	GA-02	January 3, 1993	3rd term	
208	Henry Bonilla	R	TX-23	January 3, 1993	3rd term	
209	Corrine Brown	D	FL-03	January 3, 1993	3rd term	
210	Sherrod Brown	D	OH-13	January 3, 1993	3rd term	
211	Steve Buyer	R	IN-05	January 3, 1993	3rd term	
212	Charles T. Canady	R	FL-12	January 3, 1993	3rd term	
213	Ken Calvert	R	CA-43	January 3, 1993	3rd term	
214	Mike Castle	R	DE-AL	January 3, 1993	3rd term	
215	Jim Clyburn	D	SC-06	January 3, 1993	3rd term	
216	Mac Collins	R	GA-03	January 3, 1993	3rd term	
217	Mike Crapo	R	ID-02	January 3, 1993	3rd term	Left the House in 1999.
218	Pat Danner	D	MO-06	January 3, 1993	3rd term	
219	Nathan Deal	R	GA-09	January 3, 1993	3rd term	
220	Peter Deutsch	D	FL-20	January 3, 1993	3rd term	
221	Lincoln Díaz-Balart	R	FL-21	January 3, 1993	3rd term	
222	Jay Dickey	R	AR-04	January 3, 1993	3rd term	
223	Jennifer Dunn	R	WA-08	January 3, 1993	3rd term	
224	Anna Eshoo	D	CA-14	January 3, 1993	3rd term	
225	Terry Everett	R	AL-02	January 3, 1993	3rd term	
226	Bob Filner	D	CA-51	January 3, 1993	3rd term	
227	Tillie Fowler	R	FL-04	January 3, 1993	3rd term	
228	Bob Franks	R	NJ-07	January 3, 1993	3rd term	
229	Elizabeth Furse	D	OR-01	January 3, 1993	3rd term	Left the House in 1999.
230	Bob Goodlatte	R	VA-06	January 3, 1993	3rd term	
231	Gene Green	D	TX-29	January 3, 1993	3rd term	
232	James C. Greenwood	R	PA-08	January 3, 1993	3rd term	
233	Luis Gutiérrez	D	IL-04	January 3, 1993	3rd term	
234	Jane Harman	D	CA-36	January 3, 1993	3rd term	Left the House in 1999.
235	Alcee Hastings	D	FL-23	January 3, 1993	3rd term	
236	Earl Hilliard	D	AL-07	January 3, 1993	3rd term	
237	Maurice Hinchey	D	NY-26	January 3, 1993	3rd term	
238	Pete Hoekstra	R	MI-02	January 3, 1993	3rd term	
239	Tim Holden	D	PA-06	January 3, 1993	3rd term	
240	Steve Horn	R	CA-38	January 3, 1993	3rd term	
241	Bob Inglis	R	SC-04	January 3, 1993	3rd term	Left the House in 1999.
242	Ernest Istook	R	OK-05	January 3, 1993	3rd term	
243	Eddie Bernice Johnson	D	TX-30	January 3, 1993	3rd term	
244	Jay Kim	R	CA-41	January 3, 1993	3rd term	Left the House in 1999.
245	Peter T. King	R	NY-03	January 3, 1993	3rd term	
246	Jack Kingston	R	GA-01	January 3, 1993	3rd term	
247	Ron Klink	D	PA-04	January 3, 1993	3rd term	
248	Joe Knollenberg	R	MI-11	January 3, 1993	3rd term	
249	Rick Lazio	R	NY-02	January 3, 1993	3rd term	
250	John Linder	R	GA-11	January 3, 1993	3rd term	
251	Carolyn Maloney	D	NY-14	January 3, 1993	3rd term	
252	Don Manzullo	R	IL-16	January 3, 1993	3rd term	
253	Paul McHale	D	PA-15	January 3, 1993	3rd term	Left the House in 1999.
254	John M. McHugh	R	NY-24	January 3, 1993	3rd term	
255	Scott McInnis	R	CO-03	January 3, 1993	3rd term	
256	Buck McKeon	R	CA-25	January 3, 1993	3rd term	
257	Cynthia McKinney	D	GA-04	January 3, 1993	3rd term	
258	Marty Meehan	D	MA-05	January 3, 1993	3rd term	
259	Carrie Meek	D	FL-17	January 3, 1993	3rd term	
260	Bob Menendez	D	NJ-13	January 3, 1993	3rd term	
261	John Mica	R	FL-07	January 3, 1993	3rd term	
262	Dan Miller	R	FL-13	January 3, 1993	3rd term	
263	David Minge	D	MN-02	January 3, 1993	3rd term	
264	Richard Pombo	R	CA-11	January 3, 1993	3rd term	
265	Earl Pomeroy	D	ND-AL	January 3, 1993	3rd term	
266	Deborah Pryce	R	OH-15	January 3, 1993	3rd term	
267	Jack Quinn	R	NY-30	January 3, 1993	3rd term	
268	Lucille Roybal-Allard	D	CA-33	January 3, 1993	3rd term	
269	Ed Royce	R	CA-39	January 3, 1993	3rd term	
270	Bobby Rush	D	IL-01	January 3, 1993	3rd term	
271	Bobby Scott	D	VA-03	January 3, 1993	3rd term	
272	Nick Smith	R	MI-07	January 3, 1993	3rd term	
273	Bart Stupak	D	MI-01	January 3, 1993	3rd term	
274	Frank Tejeda	D	TX-28	January 3, 1993	3rd term	Died on January 30, 1997.
275	Jim Talent	R	MO-02	January 3, 1993	3rd term	
276	Karen Thurman	D	FL-05	January 3, 1993	3rd term	
277	Nydia Velázquez	D	NY-12	January 3, 1993	3rd term	
278	Mel Watt	D	NC-12	January 3, 1993	3rd term	
279	Lynn Woolsey	D	CA-06	January 3, 1993	3rd term	
280	Albert Wynn	D	MD-04	January 3, 1993	3rd term	
281	Bennie Thompson	D	MS-02	April 13, 1993	3rd term	
282	Rob Portman	R	OH-02	May 4, 1993	3rd term	
283	Sam Farr	D	CA-17	June 8, 1993	3rd term	
284	Vern Ehlers	R	MI-03	December 7, 1993	3rd term	
285	Frank Lucas	R	OK-06	May 10, 1994	3rd term	
286	Ron Lewis	R	KY-02	May 24, 1994	3rd term	
287	Steve Largent	R	OK-01	November 29, 1994	3rd term	
288	John Baldacci	D	ME-02	January 3, 1995	2nd term	
289	Charles Bass	R	NH-02	January 3, 1995	2nd term	
290	Bob Barr	R	GA-07	January 3, 1995	2nd term	
291	Ken Bentsen Jr.	D	TX-25	January 3, 1995	2nd term	
292	Brian Bilbray	R	CA-49	January 3, 1995	2nd term	
293	Sonny Bono	R	CA-44	January 3, 1995	2nd term	Died on January 5, 1998.
294	Ed Bryant	R	TN-07	January 3, 1995	2nd term	
295	Richard Burr	R	NC-05	January 3, 1995	2nd term	
296	Steve Chabot	R	OH-01	January 3, 1995	2nd term	
297	Saxby Chambliss	R	GA-08	January 3, 1995	2nd term	
298	Helen Chenoweth	R	ID-01	January 3, 1995	2nd term	
299	Jon Christensen	R	NE-02	January 3, 1995	2nd term	Left the House in 1999.
300	Tom Coburn	R	OK-02	January 3, 1995	2nd term	
301	Barbara Cubin	R	WY-AL	January 3, 1995	2nd term	
302	Tom Davis	R	VA-11	January 3, 1995	2nd term	
303	Lloyd Doggett	D	TX-10	January 3, 1995	2nd term	
304	Mike Doyle	D	PA-18	January 3, 1995	2nd term	
305	Bob Ehrlich	R	MD-02	January 3, 1995	2nd term	
306	Phil English	R	PA-21	January 3, 1995	2nd term	
307	John Ensign	R	NV-01	January 3, 1995	2nd term	Left the House in 1999.
308	Chaka Fattah	D	PA-02	January 3, 1995	2nd term	
309	Mark Foley	R	FL-16	January 3, 1995	2nd term	
310	Michael Forbes	R	NY-01	January 3, 1995	2nd term	
311	Jon D. Fox	R	PA-13	January 3, 1995	2nd term	Left the House in 1999.
312	Rodney Frelinghuysen	R	NJ-11	January 3, 1995	2nd term	
313	Greg Ganske	R	IA-04	January 3, 1995	2nd term	
314	Lindsey Graham	R	SC-03	January 3, 1995	2nd term	
315	Gil Gutknecht	R	MN-01	January 3, 1995	2nd term	
316	Doc Hastings	R	WA-04	January 3, 1995	2nd term	
317	J. D. Hayworth	R	AZ-06	January 3, 1995	2nd term	
318	Van Hilleary	R	TN-04	January 3, 1995	2nd term	
319	John Hostettler	R	IN-08	January 3, 1995	2nd term	
320	Sheila Jackson Lee	D	TX-18	January 3, 1995	2nd term	
321	Walter B. Jones Jr.	R	NC-03	January 3, 1995	2nd term	
322	Sue W. Kelly	R	NY-19	January 3, 1995	2nd term	
323	Patrick J. Kennedy	D	RI-01	January 3, 1995	2nd term	
324	Ray LaHood	R	IL-18	January 3, 1995	2nd term	
325	Tom Latham	R	IA-05	January 3, 1995	2nd term	
326	Steve LaTourette	R	OH-19	January 3, 1995	2nd term	
327	Frank LoBiondo	R	NJ-02	January 3, 1995	2nd term	
328	Zoe Lofgren	D	CA-16	January 3, 1995	2nd term	
329	Bill Luther	D	MN-06	January 3, 1995	2nd term	
330	Frank Mascara	D	PA-20	January 3, 1995	2nd term	
331	Karen McCarthy	D	MO-05	January 3, 1995	2nd term	
332	David M. McIntosh	R	IN-02	January 3, 1995	2nd term	
333	Jack Metcalf	R	WA-02	January 3, 1995	2nd term	
334	Sue Myrick	R	NC-09	January 3, 1995	2nd term	
335	George Nethercutt	R	WA-05	January 3, 1995	2nd term	
336	Mark Neumann	R	WI-01	January 3, 1995	2nd term	Left the House in 1999.
337	Bob Ney	R	OH-18	January 3, 1995	2nd term	
338	Charlie Norwood	R	GA-10	January 3, 1995	2nd term	
339	George Radanovich	R	CA-19	January 3, 1995	2nd term	
340	Frank Riggs	R	CA-01	January 3, 1995; Previous service, 1991–1993.	3rd term*	Left the House in 1999.
341	Lynn N. Rivers	D	MI-13	January 3, 1995	2nd term	
342	Matt Salmon	R	AZ-01	January 3, 1995	2nd term	
343	Mark Sanford	R	SC-01	January 3, 1995	2nd term	
344	Joe Scarborough	R	FL-01	January 3, 1995	2nd term	
345	John Shadegg	R	AZ-04	January 3, 1995	2nd term	
346	Linda Smith	R	WA-03	January 3, 1995	2nd term	Left the House in 1999.
347	Mark Souder	R	IN-04	January 3, 1995	2nd term	
348	Mac Thornberry	R	TX-13	January 3, 1995	2nd term	
349	Todd Tiahrt	R	KS-04	January 3, 1995	2nd term	
350	Zach Wamp	R	TN-03	January 3, 1995	2nd term	
351	J. C. Watts	R	OK-04	January 3, 1995	2nd term	
352	Dave Weldon	R	FL-15	January 3, 1995	2nd term	
353	Jerry Weller	R	IL-11	January 3, 1995	2nd term	
354	Rick White	R	WA-01	January 3, 1995	2nd term	Left the House in 1999.
355	Ed Whitfield	R	KY-01	January 3, 1995	2nd term	
356	Roger Wicker	R	MS-01	January 3, 1995	2nd term	
357	Tom Campbell	R	CA-15	December 12, 1995; Previous service, 1989–1993.	4th term*	
358	Jesse Jackson Jr.	D	IL-02	December 12, 1995	2nd term	
359	Juanita Millender-McDonald	D	CA-37	March 26, 1996	2nd term	
360	Elijah Cummings	D	MD-07	April 16, 1996	2nd term	
361	Earl Blumenauer	D	OR-03	May 21, 1996	2nd term	
362	Jo Ann Emerson	R	MO-08	November 5, 1996	2nd term	
363	Jim Ryun	R	KS-02	November 27, 1996	2nd term	
364	Robert Aderholt	R	AL-04	January 3, 1997	1st term	
365	Tom Allen	D	ME-01	January 3, 1997	1st term	
366	Rod Blagojevich	D	IL-05	January 3, 1997	1st term	
367	Marion Berry	D	AR-01	January 3, 1997	1st term	
368	Roy Blunt	R	MO-07	January 3, 1997	1st term	
369	Leonard Boswell	D	IA-03	January 3, 1997	1st term	
370	Allen Boyd	D	FL-02	January 3, 1997	1st term	
371	Kevin Brady	R	TX-08	January 3, 1997	1st term	
372	Chris Cannon	R	UT-03	January 3, 1997	1st term	
373	Walter Capps	D	CA-22	January 3, 1997	1st term	Died on October 28, 1997.
374	Julia Carson	D	IN-10	January 3, 1997	1st term	
375	Merrill Cook	R	UT-02	January 3, 1997	1st term	
376	John Cooksey	R	LA-05	January 3, 1997	1st term	
377	Danny K. Davis	D	IL-07	January 3, 1997	1st term	
378	Jim Davis	D	FL-11	January 3, 1997	1st term	
379	Diana DeGette	D	CO-01	January 3, 1997	1st term	
380	Bill Delahunt	D	MA-10	January 3, 1997	1st term	
381	Bob Etheridge	D	NC-02	January 3, 1997	1st term	
382	Harold Ford Jr.	D	TN-09	January 3, 1997	1st term	
383	Jim Gibbons	R	NV-02	January 3, 1997	1st term	
384	Virgil Goode	D	VA-05	January 3, 1997	1st term	
385	Kay Granger	R	TX-12	January 3, 1997	1st term	
386	Rick Hill	R	MT-AL	January 3, 1997	1st term	
387	Rubén Hinojosa	D	TX-15	January 3, 1997	1st term	
388	Darlene Hooley	D	OR-05	January 3, 1997	1st term	
389	Kenny Hulshof	R	MO-09	January 3, 1997	1st term	
390	Asa Hutchinson	R	AR-03	January 3, 1997	1st term	
391	Bill Jenkins	R	TN-01	January 3, 1997	1st term	
392	Chris John	D	LA-07	January 3, 1997	1st term	
393	Jay W. Johnson	D	WI-08	January 3, 1997	1st term	Left the House in 1999.
394	Carolyn Cheeks Kilpatrick	D	MI-15	January 3, 1997	1st term	
395	Ron Kind	D	WI-03	January 3, 1997	1st term	
396	Dennis Kucinich	D	OH-10	January 3, 1997	1st term	
397	Nick Lampson	D	TX-09	January 3, 1997	1st term	
398	James H. Maloney	D	CT-05	January 3, 1997	1st term	
399	Carolyn McCarthy	D	NY-04	January 3, 1997	1st term	
400	Jim McGovern	D	MA-03	January 3, 1997	1st term	
401	Mike McIntyre	D	NC-07	January 3, 1997	1st term	
402	Jerry Moran	R	KS-01	January 3, 1997	1st term	
403	Anne Northup	R	KY-03	January 3, 1997	1st term	
404	Mike Pappas	R	NJ-12	January 3, 1997	1st term	Left the House in 1999.
405	Bill Pascrell	D	NJ-08	January 3, 1997	1st term	
406	Ron Paul	R	TX-14	January 3, 1997; Previous service, 1976–1977 and 1979–1985.	5th term**	
407	Edward A. Pease	R	IN-07	January 3, 1997	1st term	
408	John E. Peterson	R	PA-05	January 3, 1997	1st term	
409	Chip Pickering	R	MS-03	January 3, 1997	1st term	
410	Joe Pitts	R	PA-16	January 3, 1997	1st term	
411	David Price	D	NC-04	January 3, 1997; Previous service, 1987–1995.	5th term*	
412	Silvestre Reyes	D	TX-16	January 3, 1997	1st term	
413	Bob Riley	R	AL-03	January 3, 1997	1st term	
414	James E. Rogan	R	CA-27	January 3, 1997	1st term	
415	Steve Rothman	D	NJ-09	January 3, 1997	1st term	
416	Loretta Sanchez	D	CA-46	January 3, 1997	1st term	
417	Max Sandlin	D	TX-01	January 3, 1997	1st term	
418	Bob Schaffer	R	CO-04	January 3, 1997	1st term	
419	Pete Sessions	R	TX-05	January 3, 1997	1st term	
420	Brad Sherman	D	CA-24	January 3, 1997	1st term	
421	John Shimkus	R	IL-20	January 3, 1997	1st term	
422	Adam Smith	D	WA-09	January 3, 1997	1st term	
423	Bob Smith	R	OR-02	January 3, 1997; Previous service, 1983–1995.	7th term*	Left the House in 1999.
424	Vince Snowbarger	R	KS-03	January 3, 1997	1st term	Left the House in 1999.
425	Vic Snyder	D	AR-02	January 3, 1997	1st term	
426	Debbie Stabenow	D	MI-08	January 3, 1997	1st term	
427	Ted Strickland	D	OH-06	January 3, 1997; Previous service, 1993–1995.	2nd term*	
428	John E. Sununu	R	NH-01	January 3, 1997	1st term	
429	Ellen Tauscher	D	CA-10	January 3, 1997	1st term	
430	John Thune	R	SD-AL	January 3, 1997	1st term	
431	John F. Tierney	D	MA-06	January 3, 1997	1st term	
432	Jim Turner	D	TX-02	January 3, 1997	1st term	
433	Wes Watkins	R	OK-03	January 3, 1997; Previous service, 1977–1991.	8th term*	
434	Robert Weygand	D	RI-02	January 3, 1997	1st term	
435	Robert Wexler	D	FL-19	January 3, 1997	1st term	
	Ciro Rodriguez	D	TX-28	April 12, 1997	1st term	
	Bill Redmond	R	NM-03	May 13, 1997	1st term	Left the House in 1999.
	Vito Fossella	R	NY-13	November 4, 1997	1st term	
	Gregory Meeks	D	NY-06	February 3, 1998	1st term	
	Lois Capps	D	CA-22	March 10, 1998	1st term	
	Mary Bono	R	CA-44	April 7, 1998	1st term	
	Barbara Lee	D	CA-09	April 7, 1998	1st term	
	Bob Brady	D	PA-01	May 19, 1998	1st term	
	Heather Wilson	R	NM-01	June 23, 1998	1st term	

== Delegates ==
Rank	Delegate	Party	District	Seniority date (Previous service, if any)	No.# of term(s)	Notes
1	Eni Faleomavaega	D	AS	January 3, 1989	5th term	
2	Eleanor Holmes Norton	D	DC	January 3, 1991	4th term	
3	Carlos Romero Barceló	D	PR	January 3, 1993	3rd term	
4	Robert A. Underwood	D	GU	January 3, 1993	3rd term	
5	Donna Christian-Christensen	D	VI	January 3, 1997	1st term	

== See also ==
- 105th United States Congress
- List of United States congressional districts
- List of United States senators in the 105th Congress
