= List of United States senators in the 105th Congress =

This is a complete list of United States senators during the 105th United States Congress listed by seniority from January 3, 1997, to January 3, 1999.

Order of service is based on the commencement of the senator's first term. Behind this is former service as a senator (only giving the senator seniority within their new incoming class), service as vice president, a House member, a cabinet secretary, or a state governor. The final factor is the population of the senator's state.

In this congress, Ernest Hollings (D-South Carolina) was the most senior junior senator and Sam Brownback (R-Kansas) was the most junior senior senator.

Senators who were sworn in during the middle of the two-year congressional term (up until the last senator who was not sworn in early after winning the November 1998 election) are listed at the end of the list with no number.

== Terms of service ==
Class	Terms of service of senators that expired in years
Class 3	Terms of service of senators that expired in 1999 (AK, AL, AR, AZ, CA, CO, CT, FL, GA, HI, IA, ID, IL, IN, KS, KY, LA, MD, MO, NC, ND, NH, NV, NY, OH, OK, OR, PA, SC, SD, UT, VT, WA, and WI.)
Class 1	Terms of service of senators that expired in 2001 (AZ, CA, CT, DE, FL, HI, IN, MA, MD, ME, MI, MN, MO, MS, MT, ND, NE, NJ, NM, NV, NY, OH, PA, RI, TN, TX, UT, VA, VT, WA, WV, WI, and WY.)
Class 2	Terms of service of senators that expired in 2003 (AK, AL, AR, CO, DE, GA, IA, ID, IL, KS, KY, LA, MA, ME, MI, MN, MS, MT, NC, NE, NH, NJ, NM, OK, OR, RI, SC, SD, TN, TX, VA, WV, and WY.)

== U.S. Senate seniority list ==
U.S. Senate seniority
Rank	Senator (party-state)	Seniority date	Other factors
1	Strom Thurmond (R-SC)	November 7, 1956	
2	Robert Byrd (D-WV)	January 3, 1959	
3	Ted Kennedy (D-MA)	November 7, 1962	
4	Daniel Inouye (D-HI)	January 3, 1963	
5	Ernest Hollings (D-SC)	November 9, 1966	
6	Ted Stevens (R-AK)	December 24, 1968	
7	Bill Roth (R-DE)	January 1, 1971	
8	Jesse Helms (R-NC)	January 3, 1973	North Carolina 12th in population (1970)
9	Pete Domenici (R-NM)	January 3, 1973	New Mexico 37th in population (1970)
10	Joe Biden (D-DE)	January 3, 1973	Delaware 46th in population (1970)
11	John Glenn (D-OH)	December 24, 1974	
12	Wendell H. Ford (D-KY)	December 28, 1974	
13	Dale Bumpers (D-AR)	January 3, 1975	Former governor
14	Patrick Leahy (D-VT)	January 3, 1975	
15	John Chafee (R-RI)	December 29, 1976	
16	Paul Sarbanes (D-MD)	January 3, 1977	Former representative
17	Daniel Patrick Moynihan (D-NY)	January 3, 1977	New York 2nd in population (1970)
18	Richard Lugar (R-IN)	January 3, 1977	Indiana 11th in population (1970)
19	Orrin Hatch (R-UT)	January 3, 1977	Utah 36th in population (1970)
20	Max Baucus (D-MT)	December 15, 1978	
21	Thad Cochran (R-MS)	December 27, 1978	
22	John Warner (R-VA)	January 2, 1979	
23	Carl Levin (D-MI)	January 3, 1979	
24	Chris Dodd (D-CT)	January 3, 1981	Former representative (6 years) - Connecticut 24th in population (1970)
25	Chuck Grassley (R-IA)	January 3, 1981	Former representative (6 years) - Iowa 25th in population (1970)
26	Al D'Amato (R-NY)	January 3, 1981	New York 2nd in population (1970)
27	Arlen Specter (R-PA)	January 3, 1981	Pennsylvania 3rd in population (1970)
28	Don Nickles (R-OK)	January 3, 1981	Oklahoma 27th in population (1970)
29	Frank Murkowski (R-AK)	January 3, 1981	Alaska 50th in population (1970)
30	Frank Lautenberg (D-NJ)	December 27, 1982	
31	Jeff Bingaman (D-NM)	January 3, 1983	
32	John Kerry (D-MA)	January 2, 1985	
33	Tom Harkin (D-IA)	January 3, 1985	Former representative (10 years)
34	Phil Gramm (R-TX)	January 3, 1985	Former representative (6 years)
35	Mitch McConnell (R-KY)	January 3, 1985	
36	Jay Rockefeller (D-WV)	January 15, 1985	
37	John Breaux (D-LA)	January 3, 1987	Former representative (14 years)
38	Barbara Mikulski (D-MD)	January 3, 1987	Former representative (10 years)
39	Richard Shelby (R-AL)	January 3, 1987	Former representative (8 years) - Alabama 22nd in population (1980)
40	Tom Daschle (D-SD)	January 3, 1987	Former representative (8 years) - South Dakota 45th in population (1980)
41	John McCain (R-AZ)	January 3, 1987	Former representative (4 years) - Arizona 29th in population (1980)
42	Harry Reid (D-NV)	January 3, 1987	Former representative (4 years) - Nevada 43rd in population (1980)
43	Bob Graham (D-FL)	January 3, 1987	Former governor - Florida 7th in population (1980)
44	Kit Bond (R-MO)	January 3, 1987	Former governor - Missouri 15th in population (1980)
45	Kent Conrad (D-ND)	January 3, 1987	
46	Slade Gorton (R-WA)	January 3, 1989	Previously a senator
47	Trent Lott (R-MS)	January 3, 1989	Former representative (16 years)
48	Jim Jeffords (R-VT)	January 3, 1989	Former representative (14 years)
49	Dan Coats (R-IN)	January 3, 1989	Former representative (8 years)
50	Connie Mack (R-FL)	January 3, 1989	Former representative (6 years)
51	Richard Bryan (D-NV)	January 3, 1989	Former governor (6 years)
52	Chuck Robb (D-VA)	January 3, 1989	Former governor (4 years) - Virginia 14th in population (1980)
53	Bob Kerrey (D-NE)	January 3, 1989	Former governor (4 years) - Nebraska 35th in population (1980)
54	Herb Kohl (D-WI)	January 3, 1989	Wisconsin 16th in population (1980)
55	Joe Lieberman (D-CT)	January 3, 1989	Connecticut 25th in population (1980)
56	Conrad Burns (R-MT)	January 3, 1989	Montana 44th in population (1980)
57	Daniel Akaka (D-HI)	May 16, 1990	
58	Bob Smith (R-NH)	December 7, 1990	
59	Larry Craig (R-ID)	January 3, 1991	Former representative
60	Paul Wellstone (D-MN)	January 3, 1991	
61	Dianne Feinstein (D-CA)	November 10, 1992	
62	Byron Dorgan (D-ND)	December 15, 1992	
63	Barbara Boxer (D-CA)	January 3, 1993	Former representative (10 years)
64	Judd Gregg (R-NH)	January 3, 1993	Former representative (8 years)
65	Ben Nighthorse Campbell (R-CO)	January 3, 1993	Former representative (6 years)
66	Carol Moseley Braun (D-IL)	January 3, 1993	Illinois 6th in population (1990)
67	Lauch Faircloth (R-NC)	January 3, 1993	North Carolina 10th in population (1990)
68	Paul Coverdell (R-GA)	January 3, 1993	Georgia 11th in population (1990)
69	Russ Feingold (D-WI)	January 3, 1993	Wisconsin 16th in population (1990)
70	Patty Murray (D-WA)	January 3, 1993	Washington 18th in population (1990)
71	Bob Bennett (R-UT)	January 3, 1993	Utah 35th in population (1990)
72	Dirk Kempthorne (R-ID)	January 3, 1993	Idaho 42nd in population (1990)
73	Kay Bailey Hutchison (R-TX)	June 14, 1993	
74	Jim Inhofe (R-OK)	November 17, 1994	
75	Fred Thompson (R-TN)	December 2, 1994	
76	Olympia Snowe (R-ME)	January 3, 1995	Former representative (16 years)
77	Mike DeWine (R-OH)	January 3, 1995	Former representative (8 years) - Ohio 7th in population (1990)
78	Jon Kyl (R-AZ)	January 3, 1995	Former representative (8 years) - Arizona 24th in population (1990)
79	Craig L. Thomas (R-WY)	January 3, 1995	Former representative (6 years)
80	Rick Santorum (R-PA)	January 3, 1995	Former representative (4 years)
81	Rod Grams (R-MN)	January 3, 1995	Former representative (2 years)
82	John Ashcroft (R-MO)	January 3, 1995	Former governor
83	Spencer Abraham (R-MI)	January 3, 1995	Michigan 8th in population (1990)
84	Bill Frist (R-TN)	January 3, 1995	Tennessee 17th in population (1990)
85	Ron Wyden (D-OR)	February 6, 1996	
86	Sam Brownback (R-KS)	November 7, 1996	
87	Pat Roberts (R-KS)	January 3, 1997	Former representative (16 years)
88	Dick Durbin (D-IL)	January 3, 1997	Former representative (14 years) - Illinois 6th in population (1990)
89	Robert Torricelli (D-NJ)	January 3, 1997	Former representative (14 years) - New Jersey 9th in population (1990)
90	Tim Johnson (D-SD)	January 3, 1997	Former representative (10 years)
91	Wayne Allard (R-CO)	January 3, 1997	Former representative (6 years) - Colorado 26th in population (1990)
92	Jack Reed (D-RI)	January 3, 1997	Former representative (6 years) - Rhode Island 43rd in population (1990)
93	Tim Hutchinson (R-AR)	January 3, 1997	Former representative (4 years)
94	Max Cleland (D-GA)	January 3, 1997	Georgia 11th in population (1990)
95	Mary Landrieu (D-LA)	January 3, 1997	Louisiana 21st in population (1990)
96	Jeff Sessions (R-AL)	January 3, 1997	Alabama 22nd in population (1990)
97	Gordon H. Smith (R-OR)	January 3, 1997	Oregon 29th in population (1990)
98	Chuck Hagel (R-NE)	January 3, 1997	Nebraska 36th in population (1990)
99	Susan Collins (R-ME)	January 3, 1997	Maine 38th in population (1990)
100	Mike Enzi (R-WY)	January 3, 1997	Wyoming 50th in population (1990)

The most senior senators by class were Robert Byrd (D-West Virginia) from Class 1, Strom Thurmond (R-South Carolina) from Class 2, and Daniel Inouye (D-Hawaii) from Class 3.

== See also ==
- 105th United States Congress
- List of United States representatives in the 105th Congress
