= List of United States senators in the 104th Congress =

This is a complete list of United States senators during the 104th United States Congress listed by seniority from January 3, 1995, to January 3, 1997.

Order of service is based on the commencement of the senator's first term. Behind this is former service as a senator (only giving the senator seniority within their new incoming class), service as vice president, a House member, a cabinet secretary, or a state governor. The final factor is the population of the senator's state.

In this congress, Ernest Hollings (D-South Carolina) was the most senior junior senator and Fred Thompson (R-Tennessee) was the most junior senior senator.

Senators who were sworn in during the middle of the two-year congressional term (up until the last senator who was not sworn in early after winning the November 1996 election) are listed at the end of the list with no number.

== Terms of service ==
Class	Terms of service of senators that expired in years
Class 2	Terms of service of senators that expired in 1997 (AK, AL, AR, CO, DE, GA, IA, ID, IL, KS, KY, LA, MA, ME, MI, MN, MS, MT, NC, NE, NH, NJ, NM, OK, OR, RI, SC, SD, TN, TX, VA, WV, and WY.)
Class 3	Terms of service of senators that expired in 1999 (AK, AL, AR, AZ, CA, CO, CT, FL, GA, HI, IA, ID, IL, IN, KS, KY, LA, MD, MO, NC, ND, NH, NV, NY, OH, OK, OR, PA, SC, SD, UT, VT, WA, and WI.)
Class 1	Terms of service of senators that expired in 2001 (AZ, CA, CT, DE, FL, HI, IN, MA, MD, ME, MI, MN, MO, MS, MT, ND, NE, NJ, NM, NV, NY, OH, PA, RI, TN, TX, UT, VA, VT, WA, WI, WV, and WY.)

== U.S. Senate seniority list ==
U.S. Senate seniority
Rank	Senator (party-state)	Seniority date	Other factors
1	Strom Thurmond (R-SC)	November 7, 1956	
2	Robert Byrd (D-WV)	January 3, 1959	
3	Claiborne Pell (D-RI)	January 3, 1961	
4	Ted Kennedy (D-MA)	November 7, 1962	
5	Daniel Inouye (D-HI)	January 3, 1963	
6	Ernest Hollings (D-SC)	November 9, 1966	
7	Mark Hatfield (R-OR)	January 10, 1967	
8	Ted Stevens (R-AK)	December 24, 1968	
9	Bob Dole (R-KS)	January 3, 1969	Former representative
10	Bob Packwood (R-OR)	January 3, 1969	
11	Bill Roth (R-DE)	January 1, 1971	
12	Sam Nunn (D-GA)	November 8, 1972	
13	Bennett Johnston Jr. (D-LA)	November 14, 1972	
14	Jesse Helms (R-NC)	January 3, 1973	North Carolina 12th in population (1970)
15	Pete Domenici (R-NM)	January 3, 1973	New Mexico 37th in population (1970)
16	Joe Biden (D-DE)	January 3, 1973	Delaware 46th in population (1970)
17	John Glenn (D-OH)	December 24, 1974	
18	Wendell H. Ford (D-KY)	December 28, 1974	
19	Dale Bumpers (D-AR)	January 3, 1975	Former governor
20	Patrick Leahy (D-VT)	January 3, 1975	
21	John Chafee (R-RI)	December 29, 1976	
22	Paul Sarbanes (D-MD)	January 3, 1977	Former representative
23	Pat Moynihan (D-NY)	January 3, 1977	New York 2nd in population (1970)
24	Richard Lugar (R-IN)	January 3, 1977	Indiana 11th in population (1970)
25	Orrin Hatch (R-UT)	January 3, 1977	Utah 36th in population
26	Max Baucus (D-MT)	December 15, 1978	
27	Nancy Kassebaum Baker (R-KS)	December 23, 1978	
28	Thad Cochran (R-MS)	December 27, 1978	
29	Alan K. Simpson (R-WY)	January 1, 1979	
30	John Warner (R-VA)	January 2, 1979	
31	David Pryor (D-AR)	January 3, 1979	Former representative (6 years, 2 months)
32	William Cohen (R-ME)	January 3, 1979	Former representative (6 years)
33	Larry Pressler (R-SD)	January 3, 1979	Former representative (4 years)
34	J. James Exon (D-NE)	January 3, 1979	Former governor
35	Carl Levin (D-MI)	January 3, 1979	Michigan 7th in population (1970)
36	Bill Bradley (D-NJ)	January 3, 1979	New Jersey 8th in population (1970)
37	Howell Heflin (D-AL)	January 3, 1979	Alabama 21st in population (1970)
38	Chris Dodd (D-CT)	January 3, 1981	Former representative (6 years) - Connecticut 24th in population (1970)
39	Chuck Grassley (R-IA)	January 3, 1981	Former representative (6 years) - Iowa 25th in population (1970)
40	Al D'Amato (R-NY)	January 3, 1981	New York 2nd in population (1970)
41	Arlen Specter (R-PA)	January 3, 1981	Pennsylvania 3rd in population (1970)
42	Don Nickles (R-OK)	January 3, 1981	Oklahoma 27th in population (1970)
43	Frank Murkowski (R-AK)	January 3, 1981	Alaska 50th in population (1970)
44	Frank Lautenberg (D-NJ)	December 27, 1982	
45	Jeff Bingaman (D-NM)	January 3, 1983	
46	John Kerry (D-MA)	January 2, 1985	
47	Paul Simon (D-IL)	January 3, 1985	Former representative (10 years) - Illinois 5th in population (1980)
48	Tom Harkin (D-IA)	January 3, 1985	Former representative (10 years) - Iowa 27th in population (1980)
49	Phil Gramm (R-TX)	January 3, 1985	Former representative (6 years)
50	Mitch McConnell (R-KY)	January 3, 1985	
51	Jay Rockefeller (D-WV)	January 15, 1985	
52	John Breaux (D-LA)	January 3, 1987	Former representative (14 years)
53	Barbara Mikulski (D-MD)	January 3, 1987	Former representative (10 years)
54	Richard Shelby (R-AL)	January 3, 1987	Former representative (8 years) - Alabama 22nd in population (1980)
55	Tom Daschle (D-SD)	January 3, 1987	Former representative (8 years) - South Dakota 45th in population (1980)
56	John McCain (R-AZ)	January 3, 1987	Former representative (4 years) - Arizona 29th in population (1980)
57	Harry Reid (D-NV)	January 3, 1987	Former representative (4 years) - Nevada 43rd in population (1980)
58	Bob Graham (D-FL)	January 3, 1987	Former governor - Florida 7th in population (1980)
59	Kit Bond (R-MO)	January 3, 1987	Former governor - Missouri 15th in population (1980)
60	Kent Conrad (D-ND)	January 3, 1987	
61	Slade Gorton (R-WA)	January 3, 1989	Previously a senator
62	Trent Lott (R-MS)	January 3, 1989	Former representative (16 years)
63	Jim Jeffords (R-VT)	January 3, 1989	Former representative (14 years)
64	Dan Coats (R-IN)	January 3, 1989	Former representative (8 years)
65	Connie Mack (R-FL)	January 3, 1989	Former representative (6 years)
66	Richard Bryan (D-NV)	January 3, 1989	Former governor (6 years)
67	Chuck Robb (D-VA)	January 3, 1989	Former governor (4 years) - Virginia 14th in population (1980)
68	Bob Kerrey (D-NE)	January 3, 1989	Former governor (4 years) - Nebraska 35th in population (1980)
69	Herb Kohl (D-WI)	January 3, 1989	Wisconsin 16th in population (1980)
70	Joe Lieberman (D-CT)	January 3, 1989	Connecticut 25th in population (1980)
71	Conrad Burns (R-MT)	January 3, 1989	Montana 44th in population (1980)
72	Daniel Akaka (D-HI)	May 16, 1990	
73	Bob Smith (R-NH)	December 7, 1990	
74	Hank Brown (R-CO)	January 3, 1991	Former representative (10 years)
75	Larry Craig (R-ID)	January 3, 1991	Former representative (6 years)
76	Paul Wellstone (D-MN)	January 3, 1991	
77	Dianne Feinstein (D-CA)	November 10, 1992	
78	Byron Dorgan (D-ND)	December 15, 1992	
79	Barbara Boxer (D-CA)	January 3, 1993	Former representative (10 years)
80	Judd Gregg (R-NH)	January 3, 1993	Former representative (8 years)
81	Ben Nighthorse Campbell (D, R-CO)	January 3, 1993	Former representative (6 years)
82	Carol Moseley Braun (D-IL)	January 3, 1993	Illinois 6th in population (1990)
83	Lauch Faircloth (R-NC)	January 3, 1993	North Carolina 10th in population (1990)
84	Paul Coverdell (R-GA)	January 3, 1993	Georgia 11th in population (1990)
85	Russ Feingold (D-WI)	January 3, 1993	Wisconsin 16th in population (1990)
86	Patty Murray (D-WA)	January 3, 1993	Washington 18th in population (1990)
87	Bob Bennett (R-UT)	January 3, 1993	Utah 35th in population (1990)
88	Dirk Kempthorne (R-ID)	January 3, 1993	Idaho 42nd in population (1990)
89	Kay Bailey Hutchison (R-TX)	June 14, 1993	
90	Jim Inhofe (R-OK)	November 17, 1994	
91	Fred Thompson (R-TN)	December 2, 1994	
92	Olympia Snowe (R-ME)	January 3, 1995	Former representative (16 years)
93	Mike DeWine (R-OH)	January 3, 1995	Former representative (8 years) - Ohio 7th in population (1990)
94	Jon Kyl (R-AZ)	January 3, 1995	Former representative (8 years) - Arizona 24th in population (1990)
95	Craig L. Thomas (R-WY)	January 3, 1995	Former representative (6 years)
96	Rick Santorum (R-PA)	January 3, 1995	Former representative (4 years)
97	Rod Grams (R-MN)	January 3, 1995	Former representative (2 years)
98	John Ashcroft (R-MO)	January 3, 1995	Former governor
99	Spencer Abraham (R-MI)	January 3, 1995	Michigan 8th in population (1990)
100	Bill Frist (R-TN)	January 3, 1995	Tennessee 17th in population (1990)
	Ron Wyden (D-OR)	February 6, 1996	
	Sheila Frahm (R-KS)	June 11, 1996	
	Sam Brownback (R-KS)	November 7, 1996	

The most senior senators by class were Robert Byrd (D-West Virginia) from Class 1, Strom Thurmond (R-South Carolina) from Class 2, and Daniel Inouye (D-Hawaii) from Class 3.

== See also ==
- 104th United States Congress
- List of United States representatives in the 104th Congress
