= David Price (American politician) =

American politician (born 1940)

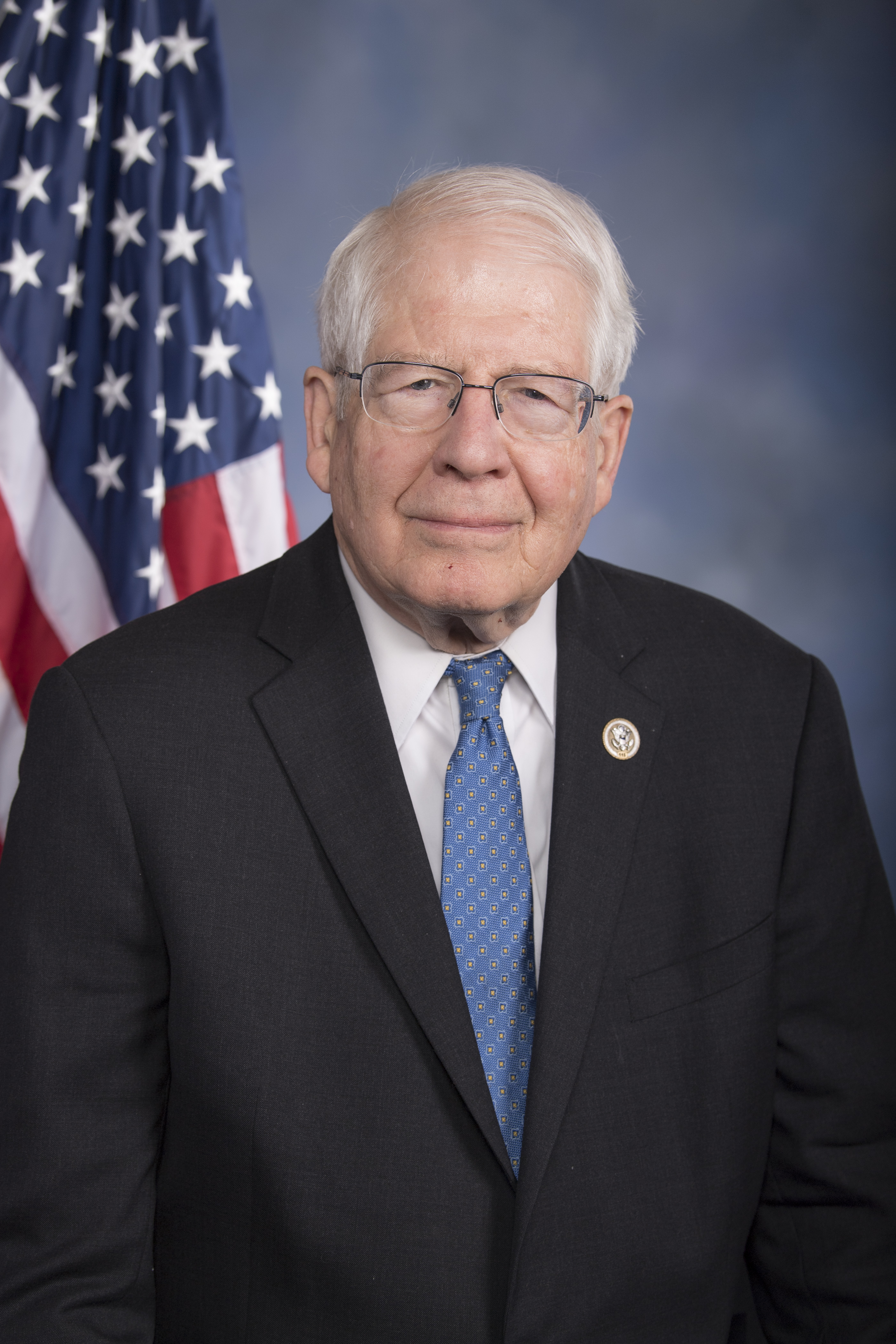

Member of the U.S. House of Representatives from North Carolina's 4th district
- In office January 3, 1997 – January 3, 2023
- Preceded by: Fred Heineman
- Succeeded by: Valerie Foushee
- In office January 3, 1987 – January 3, 1995
- Preceded by: Bill Cobey
- Succeeded by: Fred Heineman

Personal details
- Born: David Eugene Price; August 17, 1940 (age 86) Erwin, Tennessee, U.S.
- Party: Democratic
- Spouse: Lisa Kanwit (m. 1968; died 2022)
- Children: 2
- Education: Mars Hill University; University of North Carolina, Chapel Hill (BA); Yale University (BDiv, PhD)
- Price's voice Price on emergency supplemental appropriations for border security. Recorded July 28, 2010

David Eugene Price (born August 17, 1940) is an American politician who was the U.S. representative for North Carolina's 4th congressional district from 1997 to 2023, previously holding the position from 1987 to 1995. A member of the Democratic Party, he represented a district covering much of the heart of the Triangle, including all of Orange County and parts of Wake, Durham, Chatham, and adjacent counties. This district included Chapel Hill and, at various times, all or part of Durham, Raleigh, Cary, Hillsborough, and Fayetteville. Price was the dean of North Carolina's delegation to the House of Representatives. He retired from Congress in 2022.

== Early life and education ==
Born in Erwin, Tennessee, Price attended Mars Hill College when it was a junior college. He later transferred to the University of North Carolina at Chapel Hill after winning a Morehead Scholarship and became a member of the Dialectic and Philanthropic Societies. He also served in the student legislature, was president of the Baptist Student Union, and was inducted into Phi Beta Kappa and the Order of the Golden Fleece. He earned his degree in 1961. Originally intent on becoming an engineer, Price continued his education at Yale University, where he received a theology degree (1964) and a Ph.D. in political science (1969).

== Career ==
Price served as an aide to Alaska Senator Bob Bartlett in the summers from 1963 to 1967 and on the campaign staff of Senator Albert Gore, Sr. (D-TN) in 1970. He taught political science and American studies at Yale from 1969-73, and then served as a political science and public policy professor at Duke University from 1973 until his first campaign for Congress in 1986. He also served as a Duke professor during 1995 and 1996, when he was not in Congress.

Price has written a political science account, The Congressional Experience, from the perspective of a candidate for office and then a member of Congress. He took this book through four editions. Price also served as executive director (in 1980) and then state chair (in 1984) of the North Carolina Democratic Party before his election to Congress. In 1981-82 he was staff director of the Commission on Presidential Nomination, chaired by NC Governor Jim Hunt, for the Democratic National Committee.

== U.S. House of Representatives ==
=== Elections ===
1986–1992

Price first entered Congress in 1987 after defeating one-term Representative Bill Cobey, 56% to 44%. He was reelected in 1988 and 1990 with 58% of the vote. In 1992, he was reelected with 65%.

1994

In 1994, Price lost to the Republican nominee, former Raleigh police chief Fred Heineman, by a margin of less than 1% during the Republican Revolution, in part due to lower-than-expected turnout in the Democratic stronghold of Orange County (home to Chapel Hill), but despite the fact that heavily Republican Randolph County had been eliminated from the fourth district during redistricting.

1996

In 1996, Price defeated Heineman in a rematch, 54% to 44%. He was helped in part by voters who were not happy with the lack of progress made by the freshman class on the goals of the Contract with America.

1998–2006

The district reverted to form, and Price was reelected by wide margins in 1998 (57%), 2000 (62%), 2002 (61%), 2004 (64%), and 2006 (65%).

2008–2020

Price's opponent in the 2008 election was Republican B.J. Lawson. Lawson was called the most formidable opposition Price had faced since he lost to Heineman in 1994. For example, he ran television ads, which Price's opponents hadn't done in at least a decade. Despite Lawson's increased efforts and expenditures, Price defeated him, 63% to 37%.

Price launched his 2010 reelection campaign on September 8 of that year. Price defeated Lawson in a rematch, 56% to 44%.

In 2012, Price defeated the Republican nominee, businessman Tim D'Annunzio. In 2014, he defeated Republican Paul Wright, a trial lawyer, former District Court and Superior Court judge and 2012 candidate for governor of North Carolina. In 2016, Price defeated Republican nominee Sue Googe. In 2018, he defeated Republican nominee Steve Von Loor and Libertarian nominee Barbara Howe. The 4th district was reconfigured as a result of court-mandated redistricting in 2019. The new district shed much of its Raleigh sections in exchange for all of Durham County and several other more rural counties. In 2020, Price defeated Republican nominee Robert Thomas with more than 67% of the vote.

=== Tenure ===
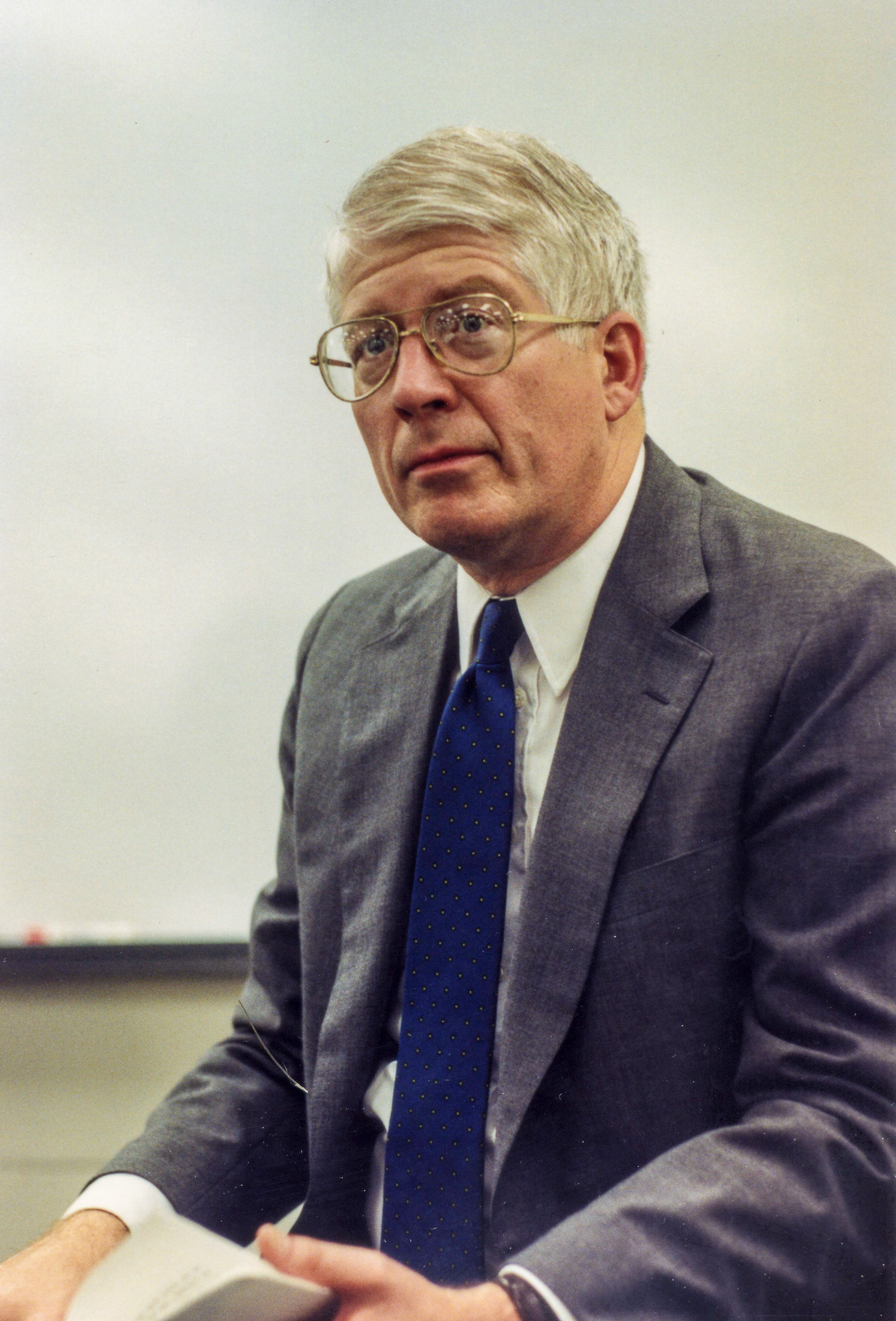
Price in 1992

The first bill that Price authored required disclosure of the terms of home equity loans. On the Appropriations Committee, he successfully pursued funding for the Environmental Protection Agency laboratory in Research Triangle Park and the NC National Guard and Emergency Operations headquarters in Raleigh.

Price was an early opponent of the Iraq War of 2003 and sponsored a bill to bring the conduct of private military companies working in Iraq under legal jurisdiction of the United States. He has also introduced legislation to prohibit contractors from performing interrogations of prisoners in the custody of intelligence agencies.

As chairman of the 2008 House subcommittee responsible for determining the budget for the Department of Homeland Security, Price sought to focus immigration enforcement efforts on criminal convicts.

Price authored a provision of the Taxpayer Relief Act of 1997 that made the interest on student loans tax-deductible, and legislation creating the Advanced Technological Education program at the National Science Foundation, which provides grants for high-tech education in community colleges and was enacted in 1993. He voted for the Emergency Economic Stabilization Act of 2008, reasoning that "the harmful effects of the credit crisis on all North Carolinians were too great for the federal government to sit on the sidelines." and for "[defending] critical emergency management and homeland security priorities" received an award from the association of state emergency managers. In December 2009, he voted for the Wall Street Reform and Consumer Protection Act, which enacted more stringent regulations on the financial industry to protect consumers and taxpayers from another financial crisis.

Price was the author of legislation to reform the public financing system for presidential campaigns.

Price has opposed concentration of media ownership. He worked on legislative initiatives to roll back the FCC's 2003 rules and co-sponsored an unsuccessful bill to overturn another 2008 FCC approval of media consolidation. Price voted for the 2006 "Markey amendment" to establish network neutrality in the Communication Act of 1934.

In 2013, Price voted against the amendment to the Patriot Act that would have eliminated Section 215 and curtailed the National Security Agency's controversial data collection program.

Price became ranking Democrat on the Transportation-HUD Appropriations Subcommittee in 2015 and chairman in 2019. His work then focused on intercity rail, mass transit, housing for the elderly and disabled, and the Choice Neighborhoods comprehensive redevelopment grants.

His foreign policy efforts focused on promoting and defending the Iran Nuclear Agreement and supporting a negotiated two-state solution to the Israeli-Palestinian conflict. He initiated and chaired the House Democracy Partnership (HDP), a bipartisan commission that engages peer-to-peer with parliaments in emerging democracies to share best practices and encourage the development of the effective institutions democracy requires.

On October 18, 2021, Price announced that he would not seek reelection.

=== Committee assignments ===
- Committee on Appropriations
  - Subcommittee on State, Foreign Operations, and Related Programs
  - Subcommittee on Homeland Security
  - Subcommittee on the Legislative Branch
  - Subcommittee on Transportation, Housing and Urban Development, and Related Agencies (Chair)

=== Caucus memberships ===
- Congressional Humanities Caucus (Co-Chair)
- United States Congressional International Conservation Caucus
- National Service Caucus (Co-Chair)
- Congressional Arts Caucus
- Veterinary Medicine Caucus
- House Baltic Caucus
- Afterschool Caucuses
- Congressional Taiwan Caucus
- Congressional NextGen 9-1-1 Caucus
- America's Languages Caucus (Co-Chair)
- Congressional Moldova Caucus (Co-Chair)
- Congressional Study Group on Germany (Chair, 1990)
- Multiple Sclerosis Caucus (Co-Chair)
- Congressional Vision Caucus (Co-Chair)

Price also chaired the House Democracy Assistance Commission (later House Democracy Partnership.

== Personal life ==
Price was married to Lisa Kanwit from 1968 until her death in 2022. Together they were longtime Democratic Party activists, and had two children: Karen, a filmmaker; and Michael, a professor of Evolutionary Psychology at Brunel University in London. Price has three grandchildren. He currently resides in Chapel Hill and is a member of the Binkley Memorial Baptist Church.

He received the 2011 John Tyler Caldwell Award for the Humanities from the North Carolina Humanities Council. Other recognitions include the American Political Science Association's Hubert Humphrey Award, Yale Divinity School's William Sloane Coffin Award for Peace and Justice, the Coast Guard's Bertholf Award, the National Guard's Charles Dick Medal, and the National Service Hall of Fame. In 2023 he received the North Carolina Award for Public Service.

Price is a Baptist.

== Electoral history ==
1986 North Carolina U.S. Representative 4th congressional district election
Primary election
Party	Candidate	Votes	%
Democratic	David Price	32,098	48.30
Democratic	Wilma Woodard	21,422	32.23
Democratic	William W. Webb	6,488	9.76
Democratic	Kirsten Nyrop	6,450	9.71
Total votes		66,458	100.00
General election
Democratic	David Price	92,216	55.66
Republican	Bill Cobey (incumbent)	73,469	44.34
Total votes		165,685	100.00
Democratic gain from Republican			

1988 North Carolina U.S. Representative 4th congressional district election
Party	Candidate	Votes	%
Democratic	David Price (incumbent)	131,896	58.01
Republican	Tom Fetzer	95,482	41.99
Total votes		227,378	100.00
Democratic hold			

1990 North Carolina U.S. Representative 4th congressional district election
Primary election
Party	Candidate	Votes	%
Democratic	David Price (incumbent)	51,122	91.32
Democratic	Robert B. Coats	2,482	4.43
Democratic	Paul E. Moore	2,377	4.25
Total votes		55,981	100.00
General election
Democratic	David Price (incumbent)	139,396	58.07
Republican	John H. Carrington	100,661	41.93
Total votes		240,057	100.00
Democratic hold			

1992 North Carolina U.S. Representative 4th congressional district election
Party	Candidate	Votes	%
Democratic	David Price (incumbent)	171,299	64.63
Republican	LaVinia "Vicky" Rothrock Goudie	89,345	33.71
Libertarian	Eugene Paczelt	4,416	1.67
Total votes		265,060	100.00
Democratic hold			

1994 North Carolina U.S. Representative 4th congressional district election
Party	Candidate	Votes	%
Republican	Fred Heineman	77,773	50.39
Democratic	David Price (incumbent)	76,558	49.61
Total votes		154,331	100.00
Republican gain from Democratic			

1996 North Carolina U.S. Representative 4th congressional district election
Party	Candidate	Votes	%
Democratic	David Price	157,194	54.39
Republican	Fred Heineman (incumbent)	126,466	43.76
Libertarian	David Allen Walker	4,132	1.43
Natural Law	Russell Wollman	1,201	0.42
Total votes		288,993	100.00
Democratic gain from Republican			

1998 North Carolina U.S. Representative 4th congressional district election
Primary election
Party	Candidate	Votes	%
Democratic	David Price (incumbent)	17,282	86.60
Democratic	Ralph M. McKinney Jr.	2,675	13.40
Total votes		19,957	100.00
General election
Democratic	David Price (incumbent)	129,157	57.43
Republican	Tom Roberg	93,469	41.56
Libertarian	Gary Goodson	2,284	1.02
Total votes		224,910	100.00
Democratic hold			

2000 North Carolina U.S. Representative 4th congressional district election
Primary election
Party	Candidate	Votes	%
Democratic	David Price (incumbent)	56,886	89.16
Democratic	John W. Winters Jr.	6,919	10.84
Total votes		63,805	100.00
General election
Democratic	David Price (incumbent)	200,885	61.65
Republican	Jess Ward	119,412	36.64
Libertarian	C. Brian Towey	5,573	1.71
Total votes		325,870	100.00
Democratic hold			

2002 North Carolina U.S. Representative 4th congressional district election
Party	Candidate	Votes	%
Democratic	David Price (incumbent)	132,185	61.18
Republican	Tuan A. Nguyen	78,095	36.15
Libertarian	Ken Nelson	5,766	2.67
Total votes		216,046	100.00
Democratic hold			

2004 North Carolina U.S. Representative 4th congressional district election
Party	Candidate	Votes	%
Democratic	David Price (incumbent)	217,441	64.10
Republican	Todd Batchelor	121,717	35.88
Libertarian	Maximilian Longley (write-in)	76	0.02
Total votes		339,234	100.00
Democratic hold			

2006 North Carolina U.S. Representative 4th congressional district election
Primary election
Party	Candidate	Votes	%
Democratic	David Price (incumbent)	39,520	89.52
Democratic	Kent Kanoy	2,756	6.24
Democratic	Oscar Lewis	1,873	4.24
Total votes		44,149	100.00
General election
Democratic	David Price (incumbent)	127,340	64.99
Republican	Steven Acuff	68,599	35.01
Total votes		195,939	100.00
Democratic hold			

2008 North Carolina U.S. Representative 4th congressional district election
Party	Candidate	Votes	%
Democratic	David Price (incumbent)	265,751	63.32
Republican	B.J. Lawson	153,947	36.68
Total votes		419,698	100.00
Democratic hold			

2010 North Carolina U.S. Representative 4th congressional district election
Party	Candidate	Votes	%
Democratic	David Price (incumbent)	155,384	57.16
Republican	B.J. Lawson	116,448	42.84
Total votes		271,832	100.00
Democratic hold			

2012 North Carolina U.S. Representative 4th congressional district election
Party	Candidate	Votes	%
Democratic	David Price (incumbent)	259,534	74.47
Republican	Tim D'Annunzio	88,951	25.53
Total votes		348,485	100.00
Democratic hold			

2014 North Carolina U.S. Representative 4th congressional district election
Party	Candidate	Votes	%
Democratic	David Price (incumbent)	169,946	74.75
Republican	Paul Wright	57,416	25.25
Total votes		227,362	100.00
Democratic hold			

2016 North Carolina U.S. Representative 4th congressional district election
Party	Candidate	Votes	%
Democratic	David Price (incumbent)	279,380	68.22
Republican	Sue Googe	130,161	31.78
Total votes		409,541	100.00
Democratic hold			

2018 North Carolina U.S. Representative 4th congressional district election
Primary election
Party	Candidate	Votes	%
Democratic	David Price (incumbent)	52,203	77.09
Democratic	Michelle Laws	11,120	16.42
Democratic	Richard L. Watkins	4,391	6.49
Total votes		67,714	100.00
General election
Democratic	David Price (incumbent)	242,067	71.96
Republican	Steve A. "Von" Loor	82,052	24.39
Libertarian	Barbara Howe	12,284	3.65
Total votes		336,403	100.00
Democratic hold			

2020 North Carolina U.S. Representative 4th congressional district election
Primary election
Party	Candidate	Votes	%
Democratic	David Price (incumbent)	153,322	86.68
Democratic	Daniel Ulysses Lockwood	23,564	13.32
Total votes		176,886	100.00
General election
Democratic	David Price (incumbent)	332,421	67.33
Republican	Robert Thomas	161,298	32.67
Total votes		493,719	100.00
Democratic hold			

U.S. House of Representatives
Preceded by Bill Cobey	Member of the U.S. House of Representatives from North Carolina's 4th congressional district 1987–1995	Succeeded by Fred Heineman
Preceded by Fred Heineman	Member of the U.S. House of Representatives from North Carolina's 4th congressional district 1997–2023	Succeeded by Valerie Foushee
New office	Ranking Member of the House Democracy Partnership; 2005–2007	Succeeded by David Dreier
Preceded by David Dreier	Chair of the House Democracy Partnership; 2007–2011	Succeeded by David Dreier
Preceded by David Dreier	Ranking Member of the House Democracy Partnership; 2011–2019	Succeeded by Vern Buchanan
Preceded by Peter Roskam	Chair of the House Democracy Partnership; 2019–2023	Succeeded by Vern Buchanan
U.S. order of precedence (ceremonial)
Preceded by Frank Wolf as Former U.S. Representative	Order of precedence of the United States as Former U.S. Representative	Followed by Joe Barton as Former U.S. Representative
