= Fred Heineman =

American politician

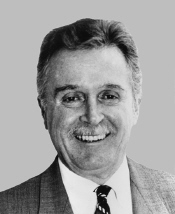

Member of the U.S. House of Representatives from North Carolina's 4th district
- In office January 3, 1995 – January 3, 1997
- Preceded by: David Price
- Succeeded by: David Price

Personal details
- Born: December 28, 1929 New York City, U.S.
- Died: March 20, 2010 (aged 80) Raleigh, North Carolina, U.S.
- Party: Republican
- Children: 5

Frederick K. Heineman (December 28, 1929 – March 20, 2010) was an American law enforcement officer and politician who one term served as a Republican U.S. Congressman from North Carolina, serving in the 104th United States Congress from 1995 to 1997.

== Early life and career ==
Born in New York City, New York, Heineman attended Mt. St. Michael High School in The Bronx. He then studied at Concordia Junior College, Westchester Community College, the University of Bridgeport, St. Francis College, and John Jay College.

=== Military service ===
Heineman served in the United States Marine Corps from 1951 to 1954, and worked as a New York City police officer between 1955 and 1979.

=== Law enforcement ===
In 1979, Heineman came to Raleigh, North Carolina as that city's chief of police. He served for 15 years, a time when Raleigh began an explosive period of growth that continues today. He promoted many women and minorities to senior positions for the first time, and cut a distinct figure with his thick New York accent.

== Congress ==
In 1994, he stepped down as chief of police and ran for Congress as a Republican against incumbent Democrat David Price, besting Price in the "Republican Revolution" of 1994. After a single term in the 104th Congress (January 3, 1995 – January 3, 1997), Heineman was defeated for re-election in 1996 by Price.

Two bills introduced by Heineman were passed by the House of Representatives: H.R. 1499, The Consumer Fraud Prevention Act of 1995 passed on September 25, 1996; and H.R. 3852, The Comprehensive Methamphetamine Control Act of 1996 passed on September 26, 1996. He also co-sponsored 174 bills during the 104th Congress. Heineman cast 1,287 votes (95.8%) and did not vote 56 times (4.2%).

He compiled an unshakably conservative voting record, with a lifetime record of 92 from the American Conservative Union. He came under fire when he claimed that despite making a combined $183,000 from his NYPD and Raleigh pensions and his congressional salary, he was part of the "lower middle class." He further argued that anyone making between $300,000 and $750,000 was a member of the middle class.

== Death ==
Fred Heineman died on March 20, 2010, at his home in Raleigh.

U.S. House of Representatives
Preceded by David Price	Member of the U.S. House of Representatives from North Carolina's 4th congressional district 1995–1997	Succeeded by David Price
