= 2000 United States House of Representatives elections =

House elections for the 107th U.S. Congress

- November 7, 2000

All 435 seats in the United States House of Representatives 218 seats needed for a majority
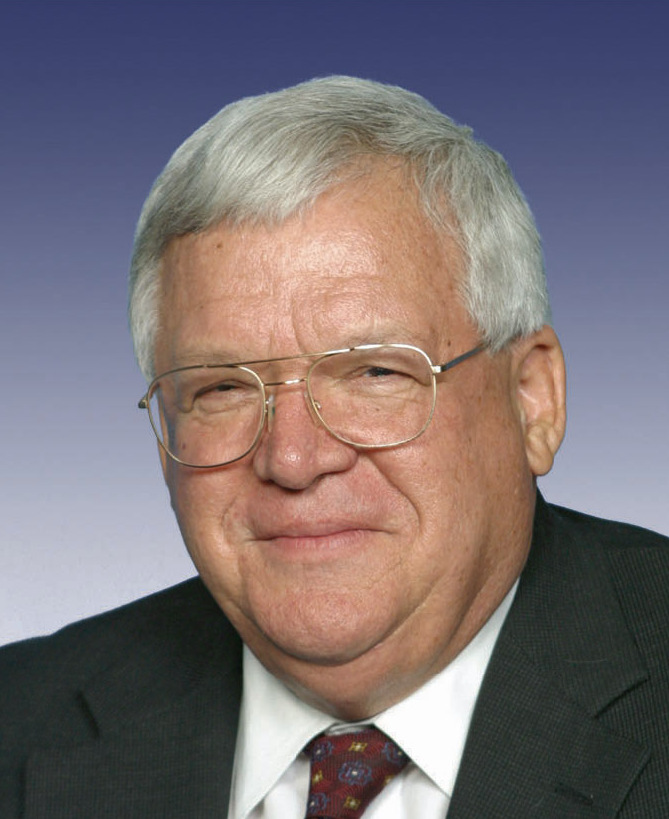

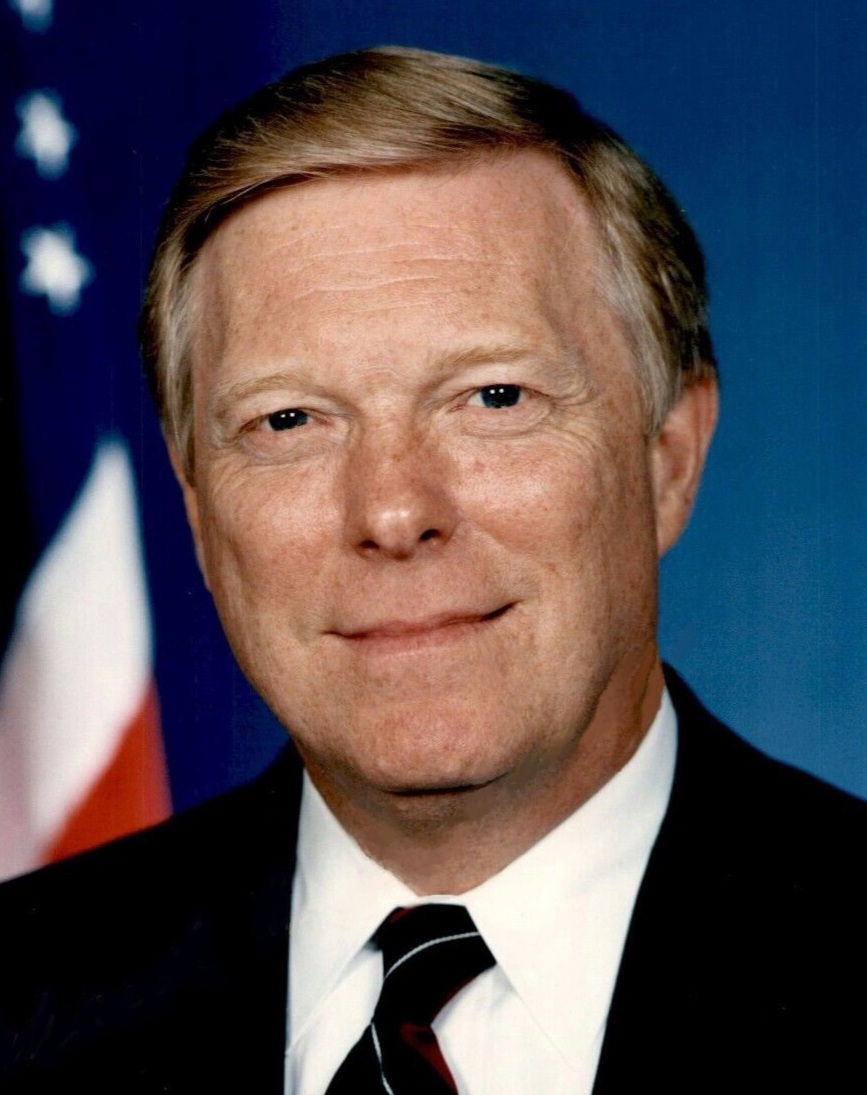
	Majority party	Minority party
Leader	Dennis Hastert	Dick Gephardt
Party	Republican	Democratic
Leader since	January 3, 1999	January 3, 1995
Leader's seat	Illinois 14th	Missouri 3rd
Last election	223 seats, 48.4%	211 seats, 47.3%
Seats won	221	212
Seat change	▼2	▲1
Popular vote	46,992,383	46,582,167
Percentage	47.6%	47.1%
Swing	▼0.8pp	▼0.2pp
	Third party
Party	Independent
Last election	1 seat
Seats won	2
Seat change	▲1
Popular vote	683,098
Percentage	0.7%
Swing	▲0.1pp
- Results: Democratic hold Democratic gain Republican hold Republican gain Independent hold Independent gain
Speaker before election
Dennis Hastert
Republican
Elected Speaker
Dennis Hastert
Republican

The 2000 United States House of Representatives elections were held on November 7, 2000, to elect U.S. Representatives to serve in the 107th United States Congress. They coincided with the election of George W. Bush as President of the United States. The Republican Party won 221 seats, while the Democratic Party won 212 and independents won two.

This marked the first time since 1992 that the victorious presidential party lost seats in the House, and the first since 1988 that they lost seats in both chambers of Congress. This resulted in the smallest Republican majority since 1952, something that would not occur again until 2024.

== Results ==
=== Federal ===
↓
221	2	212
Republican	I	Democratic

Parties	Seats				Popular vote		
Parties	1998	2000	Net change	Strength	Vote	%	Change
Republican Party	223	221	▼2	50.8%	46,992,383	47.6%	-0.8%
Democratic Party	211	212	▲1	48.7%	46,582,167	47.1%	-0.2%
Libertarian Party	-	-	-	-	1,610,292	1.6%	+0.3%
Independent	1	2	▲1	0.5%	683,098	0.7%	+0.1%
Natural Law Party	-	-	-	-	443,896	0.4%	+0.1%
Green Party	-	-	-	-	260,087	0.3%	+0.2%
Reform Party	-	-	-	-	176,269	0.2%	-0.2%
Constitution Party	-	-	-	-	122,936	0.1%	-
Independence Party	-	-	-	-	95,864	0.1%	+0.1%
Conservative Party	-	-	-	-	52,335	0.1%	-
Others	-	-	-	-	1,780,636	1.8%	+0.6%
Totals	435	435	0	100.0%	98,799,963	100.0%	-
Source: Election Statistics - Office of the Clerk

Popular vote
Republican	47.56%
Democratic	47.15%
Libertarian	1.63%
Green	0.26%
Others	3.40%

House seats
Republican	50.80%
Democratic	48.74%
Independent	0.46%

=== Maps ===
Popular vote and seats total by states

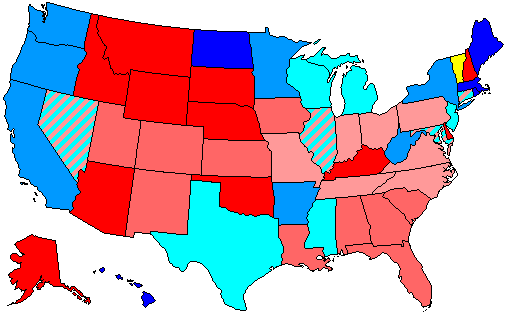
House seats by party holding plurality in state
80+% to 100% Democratic
80+% to 100% Republican
60+% to 80% Democratic
60+% to 80% Republican
Up to 60% Democratic
Up to 60% Republican
100% Independent

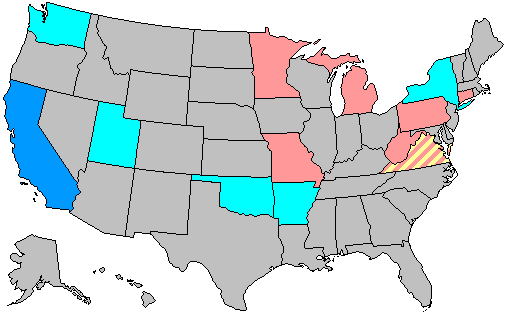
Summary of party change of U.S. House seats in the 2000 House election
6+ Democratic gain
6+ Republican gain
3–5 Democratic gain
3–5 Republican gain
1–2 Democratic gain
1–2 Republican gain
no net change
1–2 Independent gain

== Retirements ==
Retiring incumbents by district Democratic incumbent ran Democratic incumbent retired or lost renomination Republican incumbent ran Republican incumbent retired or lost renomination Independent incumbent ran Vacant district

In the November general elections, thirty incumbents did not seek re-election, either to retire or to seek other positions.

=== Democrats ===
Seven Democrats did not seek re-election.

1. Michigan 8: Debbie Stabenow retired to run for U.S. Senator.
2. Missouri 1: Bill Clay retired.
3. Missouri 6: Pat Danner retired.
4. Pennsylvania 4: Ron Klink retired to run for U.S. Senator.
5. Rhode Island 2: Robert Weygand retired to run for U.S. Senator.
6. Virginia 2: Owen B. Pickett retired.
7. West Virginia 2: Bob Wise retired to run for Governor of West Virginia.

=== Republicans ===
Twenty-three Republicans did not seek re-election.

1. Arizona 1: Matt Salmon retired to run for Governor of Arizona.
2. California 15: Tom Campbell retired to run for U.S. Senator.
3. California 48: Ron Packard retired.
4. Florida 4: Tillie Fowler retired.
5. Florida 8: Bill McCollum retired to run for U.S. Senator.
6. Florida 12: Charles T. Canady retired.
7. Idaho 1: Helen Chenoweth retired.
8. Illinois 10: John Porter retired.
9. Illinois 15: Thomas W. Ewing retired.
10. Indiana 2: David M. McIntosh retired to run for Governor of Indiana.
11. Indiana 7: Edward A. Pease retired.
12. Missouri 2: Jim Talent retired to run for Governor of Missouri.
13. Montana at-large: Rick Hill retired.
14. Nebraska 3: Bill Barrett retired.
15. New Jersey 7: Bob Franks retired to run for U.S. Senator.
16. New York 2: Rick Lazio retired to run for U.S. Senator.
17. Ohio 12: John Kasich retired to run for U.S. President.
18. Oklahoma 2: Tom Coburn retired.
19. Pennsylvania 19: William F. Goodling retired.
20. South Carolina 1: Mark Sanford retired to run for Governor of South Carolina.
21. Texas 7: Bill Archer retired.
22. Virginia 7: Thomas J. Bliley Jr. retired.
23. Washington 2: Jack Metcalf retired.

== Deaths ==
Two seats opened early due to deaths and were not filled until the November elections.

=== Democrats ===
One Democrat died.

1. Minnesota 4: Bruce Vento died October 10, 2000.

=== Republicans ===
One Republican died.

1. Virginia 1: Herbert H. Bateman died September 11, 2000.

== Incumbents defeated ==
=== In primary elections ===
==== Democrats ====
Three Democrats lost renomination, including a non-voting resident commissioner.

1. California 31: Matthew G. Martínez lost renomination to Hilda Solis, who then won the general election. He then switched parties to become a Republican on July 27, 2000.
2. New York 1: Michael Forbes lost to Regina Seltzer who lost the general election to Felix Grucci.
3. Puerto Rico at-large: Carlos Romero Barceló lost renomination to Aníbal Acevedo Vilá, who then won the general election.

==== Republicans ====
One Republican lost renomination.

1. Utah 2: Merrill Cook lost renomination to Derek Smith, who then lost the general election to Jim Matheson.

=== In the general election ===
==== Democrats ====
Two Democrats lost re-election to Republicans.

1. Connecticut 2: Sam Gejdenson lost to Rob Simmons.
2. Minnesota 2: David Minge lost to Mark Kennedy.

==== Republicans ====
Four Republicans lost re-election to Democrats.

1. Arkansas 4: Jay Dickey lost to Mike Ross.
2. California 27: James E. Rogan lost to Adam Schiff.
3. California 36: Steven T. Kuykendall lost to Jane Harman.
4. California 49: Brian Bilbray lost to Susan Davis.

== Open seats that changed parties ==
=== Democratic seats won by Republicans ===
Five Democratic seats were won by Republicans.

1. Michigan 8: Won by Mike Rogers.
2. Missouri 6: Won by Sam Graves.
3. Pennsylvania 4: Won by Melissa Hart.
4. Virginia 2: Won by Ed Schrock.
5. West Virginia 2: Won by Shelley Moore Capito.

=== Republican seats won by Democrats ===
Four Republican seats were won by Democrats.

1. California 15: Won by Mike Honda.
2. New York 2: Won by Steve Israel.
3. Oklahoma 2: Won by Brad Carson.
4. Washington 2: Won by Rick Larsen.

== Open seats that parties held ==
=== Democratic seats held by Democrats ===
Three held five of their open seats.

1. Minnesota 4: Won by Betty McCollum.
2. Missouri 1: Won by Lacy Clay.
3. Rhode Island 2: Won by James Langevin.

=== Republican seats held by Republicans ===
Twenty held fourteen of their open seats.

1. Arizona 1: Won by Jeff Flake.
2. California 48: Won by Darrell Issa.
3. Florida 4: Won by Ander Crenshaw.
4. Florida 8: Won by Ric Keller.
5. Florida 12: Won by Adam Putnam.
6. Idaho 1: Won by Butch Otter.
7. Illinois 10: Won by Mark Kirk.
8. Illinois 15: Won by Tim Johnson.
9. Indiana 2: Won by Mike Pence.
10. Indiana 7: Won by Brian Kerns.
11. Missouri 2: Won by Todd Akin.
12. Montana at-large: Won by Denny Rehberg.
13. Nebraska 3: Won by Tom Osborne.
14. New Jersey 7: Won by Mike Ferguson.
15. Ohio 12: Won by Pat Tiberi.
16. Pennsylvania 19: Won by Todd Russell Platts.
17. South Carolina 1: Won by Henry E. Brown Jr.
18. Texas 7: Won by John Culberson.
19. Virginia 1: Won by Jo Ann Davis.
20. Virginia 7: Won by Eric Cantor.

== Generic congressional ballot polls ==
Poll source	Date(s)	Sample size	Margin of error	Republican	Democratic	Other / undecided (Note: Calculated by taking the difference of 100% and all other candidates combined.)
Gallup	November 6, 2000	2,350	—	45%	49%	6%
Lake Research Partners/The Tarrance Group	November 6, 2000	1,000	—	42%	44%	14%
Rasmussen Reports	November 5, 2000	3,750	—	43.9%	41.4%	14.7%
CBS News/The New York Times	November 4, 2000	1,273	—	38%	41%	21%
Pew Research Center	November 4, 2000	1,829 (RV)	—	42%	48%	10%
CBS News/The New York Times	November 3, 2000	1,158	—	39%	40%	21%
Pew Research Center	November 3, 2000	1,805 (RV)	—	43%	47%	10%
Opinion Dynamics	November 2, 2000	1,000	—	42%	45%	13%
Lake Research Partners/The Tarrance Group	November 1, 2000	1,000	—	42%	41%	17%
Polling Company/Global Strategy Group	November 1, 2000	1,000	—	42%	39%	19%
Princeton Survey Research Associates International	November 1, 2000	600 (RV) (Note: Sample size unavailable; 600 is a default estimate used in the source dataset.)	—	41%	50%	9%
Rasmussen Reports	November 1, 2000	3,750	—	41%	41.2%	17.8%
GQR (D) (Note: Poll conducted for an unspecified Democratic sponsor.)	October 31, 2000	1,016	—	44%	49%	7%
CBS News/The New York Times	October 30, 2000	965	—	37%	44%	19%
Gallup	October 28, 2000	600 (RV)	—	45%	47%	8%
Lake Research Partners/The Tarrance Group	October 27, 2000	1,000	—	38%	42%	20%
Princeton Survey Research Associates International	October 26, 2000	600	—	37%	43%	20%
Princeton Survey Research Associates International	October 26, 2000	709 (Note: Average of multiple versions or turnout models listed in the poll.)	—	40.5%	44.5%	15%
Yankelovich Partners Inc.	October 26, 2000	1,076	—	45%	46%	9%
GQR (D)	October 25, 2000	998	—	42%	47%	11%
Gallup	October 25, 2000	600 (RV)	—	47%	45%	8%
Zogby Analytics	October 24, 2000	1,209	—	38%	45%	17%
Rasmussen Reports	October 22, 2000	3,750	—	41.2%	39.3%	19.5%
Lake Research Partners/The Tarrance Group	October 21, 2000	1,000	—	40%	42%	18%
Zogby Analytics	October 21, 2000	1,204	—	42%	40%	18%
American Viewpoint	October 20, 2000	800	—	41%	40%	19%
CBS News/The New York Times	October 20, 2000	825	—	38%	38%	24%
Princeton Survey Research Associates International	October 19, 2000	800	—	43%	47%	10%
Zogby Analytics	October 18, 2000	1,200	—	39%	39%	22%
Gallup	October 17, 2000	706	—	50%	45%	5%

== Closest races ==
Forty-two races were decided by 10% or lower.

District	Winner	Margin
Michigan 8th	Republican (flip)	0.04%
Minnesota 2nd	Republican (flip)	0.05%
New Jersey 12th	Democratic	0.22%
Florida 22nd	Republican	0.28%
California 38th	Republican	0.98%
Connecticut 2nd	Republican (flip)	1.27% (Note: This seat was the tipping point seat for a Republican majority.)
Minnesota 6th	Democratic	1.53%
Florida 8th	Republican	1.61%
California 36th	Democratic (flip)	1.86%
Arkansas 4th	Democratic (flip)	1.94%
Illinois 10th	Republican	2.38%
West Virginia 2nd	Republican (flip)	2.57%
Wisconsin 2nd	Democratic	2.80%
Kansas 3rd	Democratic	3.19%
California 49th	Democratic (flip)	3.45%
Virginia 2nd	Republican (flip)	4.00%
Missouri 6th	Republican (flip)	4.08%
Washington 2nd	Democratic (flip)	4.08%
Indiana 3rd	Democratic	4.17%
Pennsylvania 10th	Republican	5.16%
Montana at-large	Republican	5.22%
New Jersey 7th	Republican	6.01%
Illinois 15th	Republican	6.45%
Maryland 8th	Republican	6.46%
Pennsylvania 15th	Republican	6.50%
California 20th	Democratic	6.85%
Georgia 2nd	Democratic	6.97%
Pennsylvania 13th	Democratic	7.06%
New Mexico 1st	Republican	7.09%
Indiana 8th	Republican	7.38%
Nevada 1st	Democratic	7.50%
New Hampshire 1st	Republican	7.80%
Ohio 1st	Republican	8.37%
North Dakota at-large	Democratic	8.37%
California 10th	Democratic	8.39%
Kentucky 3rd	Republican	8.64%
California 22nd	Democratic	8.80%
California 27th	Democratic (flip)	8.89%
Ohio 12th	Republican	9.04%
Connecticut 5th	Democratic	9.33%
Texas 5th	Republican	9.60%
Illinois 17th	Democratic	9.78%

== Alabama ==
District	Incumbent			Results	Candidates
District	Member	Party	First elected	Results	Candidates
Alabama 1	Sonny Callahan	Republican	1984	Incumbent re-elected.	▌ ✓ Sonny Callahan (Republican) 91.3%; ▌Dick Coffee (Libertarian) 8.5%
Alabama 2	Terry Everett	Republican	1992	Incumbent re-elected.	▌ ✓ Terry Everett (Republican) 68.2%; ▌Charles Woods (Democratic) 29.2%; ▌Wallace B. McGahan (Libertarian) 1.8%
Alabama 3	Bob Riley	Republican	1996	Incumbent re-elected.	▌ ✓ Bob Riley (Republican) 86.9%; ▌John Sophocleus (Libertarian) 8.5%
Alabama 4	Robert Aderholt	Republican	1996	Incumbent re-elected.	▌ ✓ Robert Aderholt (Republican) 60.6%; ▌Marsha Folsom (Democratic) 37.4%; ▌Craig Goodrich (Libertarian) 1.5%
Alabama 5	Robert E. Cramer	Democratic	1990	Incumbent re-elected.	▌ ✓ Robert E. Cramer (Democratic) 88.8%; ▌Alan F. Barksdale (Libertarian) 10.5%
Alabama 6	Spencer Bachus	Republican	1992	Incumbent re-elected.	▌ ✓ Spencer Bachus (Republican) 87.9%; ▌Terry Reagin (Libertarian) 11.7%
Alabama 7	Earl Hilliard	Democratic	1992	Incumbent re-elected.	▌ ✓ Earl Hilliard (Democratic) 74.6%; ▌Ed Martin (Republican) 23.2%; ▌Ken Hager (Libertarian) 1.9%

== Alaska ==
District	Incumbent			Results	Candidates
District	Member	Party	First elected	Results	Candidates
Alaska at-large	Don Young	Republican	1973 (Special)	Incumbent re-elected.	▌ ✓ Don Young (Republican) 71%; ▌Clifford Greene (Democratic) 17%; ▌Anna Young (Green) 8%; ▌Jim Dore (AIP) 4%; ▌Leonard Karpinski (Libertarian) 2%

== Arizona ==
District	Incumbent			Results	Candidates
District	Member	Party	First elected	Results	Candidates
Arizona 1	Matt Salmon	Republican	1994	Incumbent retired. Republican hold.	▌ ✓ Jeff Flake (Republican) 53.6%; ▌David Mendoza (Democratic) 42.4%; ▌Jon Burroughs (Libertarian) 4%
Arizona 2	Ed Pastor	Democratic	1991 (Special)	Incumbent re-elected.	▌ ✓ Ed Pastor (Democratic) 68.5%; ▌Bill Barenholtz (Republican) 26.9%; ▌Geoffrey Weber (Libertarian) 2.6%; ▌Barbara Shelor (Natural Law) 2%
Arizona 3	Bob Stump	Republican	1976 (Note: Stump was originally elected as a Democrat. He switched parties in 1982 and was re-elected as such that year.)	Incumbent re-elected.	▌ ✓ Bob Stump (Republican) 65.7%; ▌Gene Scharer (Democratic) 31.4%; ▌Edward R. Carlson (Libertarian) 3%
Arizona 4	John Shadegg	Republican	1994	Incumbent re-elected.	▌ ✓ John Shadegg (Republican) 64%; ▌Ben Jankowski (Democratic) 32.7%; ▌Ernest Hancock (Libertarian) 3.3%
Arizona 5	Jim Kolbe	Republican	1984	Incumbent re-elected.	▌ ✓ Jim Kolbe (Republican) 60.1%; ▌George Cunningham (Democratic) 35.3%; ▌Michael Jay Green (Green) 3.1%; ▌Aage Nost (Libertarian) 1.4%
Arizona 6	J. D. Hayworth	Republican	1994	Incumbent re-elected.	▌ ✓ J. D. Hayworth (Republican) 61.4%; ▌Larry Nelson (Democratic) 35.6%; ▌Richard Duncan (Libertarian) 3%

== Arkansas ==
District	Incumbent			Results	Candidates
District	Member	Party	First elected	Results	Candidates
Arkansas 1	Marion Berry	Democratic	1996	Incumbent re-elected.	▌ ✓ Marion Berry (Democratic) 60.1%; ▌Susan Myshka (Republican) 39.7%
Arkansas 2	Vic Snyder	Democratic	1996	Incumbent re-elected.	▌ ✓ Vic Snyder (Democratic) 57.5%; ▌Bob Thomas (Republican) 42.5%
Arkansas 3	Asa Hutchinson	Republican	1996	Incumbent re-elected.	▌ ✓ Asa Hutchinson (Republican) Uncontested
Arkansas 4	Jay Dickey	Republican	1992	Incumbent lost re-election. Democratic gain.	▌ ✓ Mike Ross (Democratic) 51.0%; ▌Jay Dickey (Republican) 49.0%

== California ==
District	Incumbent			Results	Candidates
District	Member	Party	First elected	Results	Candidates
California 1	Mike Thompson	Democratic	1998	Incumbent re-elected.	▌ ✓ Mike Thompson (Democratic) 65.1%; ▌Russel Chase (Republican) 28%; ▌Cheryl Kreier (Natural Law) 3%; ▌Emil Rossi (Libertarian) 2.6%; ▌Pamela Elizondo (Reform) 1.3%
California 2	Wally Herger	Republican	1988	Incumbent re-elected.	▌ ✓ Wally Herger (Republican) 65.8%; ▌Stan Morgan (Democratic) 28.2%; ▌John McDermott (Natural Law) 3.4%; ▌Charles R. Martin (Libertarian) 2.6%
California 3	Doug Ose	Republican	1998	Incumbent re-elected.	▌ ✓ Doug Ose (Republican) 56.2%; ▌Bob Kent (Democratic) 40.5%; ▌Douglas Arthur Tuma (Libertarian) 2.2%; ▌Channing Jones (Natural Law) 1.1%
California 4	John Doolittle	Republican	1990	Incumbent re-elected.	▌ ✓ John Doolittle (Republican) 63.5%; ▌Mark Norberg (Democratic) 31.5%; ▌William Fritz Frey (Libertarian) 3%; ▌Robert Ray (Natural Law) 2%
California 5	Bob Matsui	Democratic	1978	Incumbent re-elected.	▌ ✓ Bob Matsui (Democratic) 68.7%; ▌Ken Payne (Republican) 26.2%; ▌Ken Adams (Green) 2.9%; ▌Cullene Lang (Libertarian) 1.3%; ▌Charles Kersey (Natural Law) 0.9%
California 6	Lynn Woolsey	Democratic	1992	Incumbent re-elected.	▌ ✓ Lynn Woolsey (Democratic) 64.4%; ▌Ken McAuliffe (Republican) 28.4%; ▌Justin Moscoso (Green) 4.6%; ▌Richard O. Barton (Libertarian) 1.6%; ▌Alan Roy Barreca (Natural Law) 1%
California 7	George Miller	Democratic	1974	Incumbent re-elected.	▌ ✓ George Miller (Democratic) 76.5%; ▌Christopher Hoffman (Republican) 21.2%; ▌Martin Sproul (Natural Law) 2.3%
California 8	Nancy Pelosi	Democratic	1987	Incumbent re-elected.	▌ ✓ Nancy Pelosi (Democratic) 84.5%; ▌Adam Sparks (Republican) 11.7%; ▌Erik Bauman (Libertarian) 2.6%; ▌David Smithstein (Natural Law) 1.2%
California 9	Barbara Lee	Democratic	1998	Incumbent re-elected.	▌ ✓ Barbara Lee (Democratic) 85%; ▌Arneze Washington (Republican) 9.8%; ▌Fred Foldvary (Libertarian) 3.3%; ▌Ellen Jefferds (Natural Law) 1.9%
California 10	Ellen Tauscher	Democratic	1996	Incumbent re-elected.	▌ ✓ Ellen Tauscher (Democratic) 52.7%; ▌Claude B. Hutchison Jr. (Republican) 44.2%; ▌Valerie Janlois (Libertarian) 3.1%
California 11	Richard Pombo	Republican	1992	Incumbent re-elected.	▌ ✓ Richard Pombo (Republican) 57.9%; ▌Tom Santos (Democratic) 38.1%; ▌Kathryn Russow (Libertarian) 2.4%; ▌Jon Kurey (Natural Law) 1.6%
California 12	Tom Lantos	Democratic	1980	Incumbent re-elected.	▌ ✓ Tom Lantos (Democratic) 74.6%; ▌Mike Garza (Republican) 20.8%; ▌Barbara Less (Libertarian) 3%; ▌Rifkin Young (Natural Law) 1.6%
California 13	Pete Stark	Democratic	1972	Incumbent re-elected.	▌ ✓ Pete Stark (Democratic) 70.5%; ▌James Goetz (Republican) 24.3%; ▌Howard Mora (Libertarian) 2.6%; ▌Timothy Hoehner (Natural Law) 1.4%; ▌Don Grundmann (American Independent) 1.2%
California 14	Anna Eshoo	Democratic	1992	Incumbent re-elected.	▌ ✓ Anna Eshoo (Democratic) 70.3%; ▌Bill Quraishi (Republican) 25.8%; ▌Joseph Dehn III (Libertarian) 2%; ▌John H. Black (Natural Law) 1.9%
California 15	Tom Campbell	Republican	1988; 1992 (Defeated); 1995 (Special)	Incumbent retired to run for U.S. Senator. Democratic gain.	▌ ✓ Mike Honda (Democratic) 54.3%; ▌Jim Cunneen (Republican) 42.2%; ▌Ed Wimmers (Libertarian) 2%; ▌Douglas Gorney (Natural Law) 1.5%
California 16	Zoe Lofgren	Democratic	1994	Incumbent re-elected.	▌ ✓ Zoe Lofgren (Democratic) 72.1%; ▌Horace Gene Thayn (Republican) 23.3%; ▌Dennis Michael Umphress (Libertarian) 3%; ▌Edward Klein (Natural Law) 1.6%
California 17	Sam Farr	Democratic	1993	Incumbent re-elected.	▌ ✓ Sam Farr (Democratic) 68.7%; ▌Clint Engler (Republican) 24.7%; ▌E. Craig Coffin (Green) 4%; ▌Rick Garrett (Libertarian) 1.2%; ▌Larry Fenton (Reform) 1%; ▌Scott Hartley (Natural Law) 0.4%
California 18	Gary Condit	Democratic	1989	Incumbent re-elected.	▌ ✓ Gary Condit (Democratic) 67.2%; ▌Steve Wilson (Republican) 31.3%; ▌Page Roth Riskin (Natural Law) 1.5%
California 19	George Radanovich	Republican	1994	Incumbent re-elected.	▌ ✓ George Radanovich (Republican) 65%; ▌Dan Rosenberg (Democratic) 31.8%; ▌Elizabeth Taylor (Libertarian) 1.9%; Others: ▌Bob Miller (Natural Law) 0.8%; ▌Edmon Kaiser (American Independent) 0.5%
California 20	Cal Dooley	Democratic	1990	Incumbent re-elected.	▌ ✓ Cal Dooley (Democratic) 52.4%; ▌Rich Rodriguez (Republican) 45.5%; ▌Walter Kenneth Ruehlig (Natural Law) 1.1%; ▌Arnold Kriegbaum (Libertarian) 1%
California 21	Bill Thomas	Republican	1978	Incumbent re-elected.	▌ ✓ Bill Thomas (Republican) 71.6%; ▌Pedro Martinez Jr. (Democratic) 24.8%; ▌James R. S. Manion (Libertarian) 3.6%
California 22	Lois Capps	Democratic	1998	Incumbent re-elected.	▌ ✓ Lois Capps (Democratic) 53.2%; ▌Mike Stoker (Republican) 44.4%; Others: ▌Dick Porter (Reform) 0.9%; ▌Joe Furcinite (Libertarian) 0.8%; ▌Carlos Aguirre (Natural Law) 0.7%
California 23	Elton Gallegly	Republican	1986	Incumbent re-elected.	▌ ✓ Elton Gallegly (Republican) 54.1%; ▌Michael Case (Democratic) 40.7%; ▌Cary Savitch (Reform) 3%; ▌Roger Peebles (Libertarian) 1.6%; ▌Stephen Hospodar (Natural Law) 0.6%
California 24	Brad Sherman	Democratic	1996	Incumbent re-elected.	▌ ✓ Brad Sherman (Democratic) 66.1%; ▌Jerry Doyle (Republican) 29.8%; ▌Juan Carlos Ros (Libertarian) 2.9%; ▌Michael Cuddehe (Natural Law) 1.2%
California 25	Buck McKeon	Republican	1992	Incumbent re-elected.	▌ ✓ Buck McKeon (Republican) 62.3%; ▌Sid Gold (Democratic) 33.2%; ▌Bruce Acker (Libertarian) 3.2%; ▌Mews Small (Natural Law) 1.3%
California 26	Howard Berman	Democratic	1982	Incumbent re-elected.	▌ ✓ Howard Berman (Democratic) 84.1%; ▌Bill Farley (Libertarian) 11.4%; ▌David Cossak (Natural Law) 4.5%
California 27	James E. Rogan	Republican	1996	Incumbent lost re-election. Democratic gain.	▌ ✓ Adam Schiff (Democratic) 52.7%; ▌James E. Rogan (Republican) 43.9%; ▌Ted Brown (Libertarian) 1.7%; ▌Miriam Hospodar (Natural Law) 1.7%
California 28	David Dreier	Republican	1980	Incumbent re-elected.	▌ ✓ David Dreier (Republican) 56.9%; ▌Janice Nelson (Democratic) 39.9%; ▌Randall Weissbuch (Libertarian) 1.3%; ▌M. Lawrence Allison (Natural Law) 1%; ▌Joe Haytas (American Independent) 0.9%
California 29	Henry Waxman	Democratic	1974	Incumbent re-elected.	▌ ✓ Henry Waxman (Democratic) 75.7%; ▌Jim Scileppi (Republican) 19.3%; ▌Jack C. Anderson (Libertarian) 3.3%; ▌Bruce Currivan (Natural Law) 1.7%
California 30	Xavier Becerra	Democratic	1992	Incumbent re-elected.	▌ ✓ Xavier Becerra (Democratic) 83.3%; ▌Tony Goss (Republican) 11.8%; ▌Jason Heath (Libertarian) 2.9%; ▌Gary Hearne (Natural Law) 2%
California 31	Matthew G. Martínez	Republican	1982 (Note: Martínez switched parties in July 2000 after losing the Democratic nomination to Hilda Solis.)	Incumbent lost renomination. Democratic gain.	▌ ✓ Hilda Solis (Democratic) 79.4%; ▌Krista Lieberg-Wong (Green) 9.1%; ▌Michael McGuire (Libertarian) 6.3%; ▌Richard Griffin (Natural Law) 5.2%
California 32	Julian Dixon	Democratic	1978	Incumbent re-elected.	▌ ✓ Julian Dixon (Democratic) 83.6%; ▌Kathy Williamson (Republican) 12.2%; ▌Bob Weber (Libertarian) 2.3%; ▌Rashied Jibri (Natural Law) 1.9%
California 33	Lucille Roybal-Allard	Democratic	1992	Incumbent re-elected.	▌ ✓ Lucille Roybal-Allard (Democratic) 84.6%; ▌Wayne Miller (Republican) 11.6%; ▌Nathan Craddock (Libertarian) 2.2%; ▌William Harpur (Natural Law) 1.6%
California 34	Grace Napolitano	Democratic	1998	Incumbent re-elected.	▌ ✓ Grace Napolitano (Democratic) 71.3%; ▌Robert Arthur Canales (Republican) 22.5%; ▌Julia Simon (Natural Law) 6.2%
California 35	Maxine Waters	Democratic	1990	Incumbent re-elected.	▌ ✓ Maxine Waters (Democratic) 86.6%; ▌Carl McGill (Republican) 10.9%; ▌Gordon Mego (American Independent) 1.6%; ▌Rick Dunstan (Natural Law) 0.9%
California 36	Steven T. Kuykendall	Republican	1998	Incumbent lost re-election. Democratic gain.	▌ ✓ Jane Harman (Democratic) 48.4%; ▌Steven T. Kuykendall (Republican) 46.6%; ▌Daniel Sherman (Libertarian) 2.6%; ▌John Konopka (Reform) 1.4%; ▌Matt Ornati (Natural Law) 0.9%
California 37	Juanita Millender-McDonald	Democratic	1996	Incumbent re-elected.	▌ ✓ Juanita Millender-McDonald (Democratic) 82.4%; ▌Vernon Van (Republican) 11.3%; ▌Margaret Glazer (Natural Law) 3.6%; ▌Herb Peters (Libertarian) 2.7%
California 38	Steve Horn	Republican	1992	Incumbent re-elected.	▌ ✓ Steve Horn (Republican) 48.5%; ▌Gerrie Schipske (Democratic) 47.5%; ▌Jack Neglia (Libertarian) 2%; ▌Karen Blasdell-Wilkinson (Natural Law) 2%
California 39	Ed Royce	Republican	1992	Incumbent re-elected.	▌ ✓ Ed Royce (Republican) 62.8%; ▌Gill Kanel (Democratic) 31.5%; ▌Ron Jevning (Natural Law) 3.2%; ▌Keith Gann (Libertarian) 2.5%
California 40	Jerry Lewis	Republican	1978	Incumbent re-elected.	▌ ✓ Jerry Lewis (Republican) 80%; ▌Jay Lindberg (Libertarian) 10%; ▌Frank Schmit (Natural Law) 10%
California 41	Gary Miller	Republican	1998	Incumbent re-elected.	▌ ✓ Gary Miller (Republican) 59%; ▌Rodolfo Favila (Democratic) 37.4%; ▌David Kramer (Natural Law) 3.6%
California 42	Joe Baca	Democratic	1999 (special)	Incumbent re-elected.	▌ ✓ Joe Baca (Democratic) 59.8%; ▌Eli Pirozzi (Republican) 35.2%; ▌John Ballard (Libertarian) 2.6%; ▌Gwyn Hartley (Natural Law) 2.4%
California 43	Ken Calvert	Republican	1992	Incumbent re-elected.	▌ ✓ Ken Calvert (Republican) 73.7%; ▌Bill Reed (Libertarian) 15.6%; ▌Nathaniel Adam (Natural Law) 10.7%
California 44	Mary Bono	Republican	1998	Incumbent re-elected.	▌ ✓ Mary Bono (Republican) 59.2%; ▌Ron Oden (Democratic) 38%; ▌Gene Smith (Reform) 1.9%; ▌Jim Meuer (Natural Law) 0.9%
California 45	Dana Rohrabacher	Republican	1988	Incumbent re-elected.	▌ ✓ Dana Rohrabacher (Republican) 62.2%; ▌Ted Crisell (Democratic) 32.4%; ▌Don Hull (Libertarian) 3.8%; ▌Constance Betton (Natural Law) 1.6%
California 46	Loretta Sanchez	Democratic	1996	Incumbent re-elected.	▌ ✓ Loretta Sanchez (Democratic) 60.3%; ▌Gloria Matta Tuchman (Republican) 35%; ▌Richard Boddie (Libertarian) 2.7%; ▌Larry Engwall (Natural Law) 2%
California 47	Christopher Cox	Republican	1988	Incumbent re-elected.	▌ ✓ Christopher Cox (Republican) 65.7%; ▌John Graham (Democratic) 30.1%; ▌David Nolan (Libertarian) 2.9%; ▌Iris Adam (Natural Law) 1.3%
California 48	Ron Packard	Republican	1982	Incumbent retired. Republican hold.	▌ ✓ Darrell Issa (Republican) 61.5%; ▌Peter Kouvelis (Democratic) 28.4%; ▌Eddie Rose (Reform) 4.3%; ▌Sharon Miles (Natural Law) 3.1%; ▌Joe Michael Cobb (Libertarian) 2.7%
California 49	Brian Bilbray	Republican	1994	Incumbent lost re-election. Democratic gain.	▌ ✓ Susan Davis (Democratic) 49.7%; ▌Brian Bilbray (Republican) 46.2%; ▌Doris Ball (Libertarian) 2.8%; ▌Tahir Bhatti (Natural Law) 1.3%
California 50	Bob Filner	Democratic	1992	Incumbent re-elected.	▌ ✓ Bob Filner (Democratic) 68.3%; ▌Bob Divine (Republican) 27.7%; ▌David Willoughby (Libertarian) 2.4%; ▌LeeAnn Kendall (Natural Law) 1.6%
California 51	Duke Cunningham	Republican	1990	Incumbent re-elected.	▌ ✓ Duke Cunningham (Republican) 64.4%; ▌George Jorge Barraza (Democratic) 30.4%; ▌Daniel L. Muhe (Libertarian) 2.7%; ▌Eric Hunter Bourdette (Natural Law) 2.5%
California 52	Duncan L. Hunter	Republican	1980	Incumbent re-elected.	▌ ✓ Duncan L. Hunter (Republican) 64.8%; ▌Craig Barkacs (Democratic) 31.3%; ▌Michael Benoit (Libertarian) 2.9%; ▌Robert Sherman (Natural Law) 1%

== Colorado ==
District	Incumbent			Results	Candidates
District	Member	Party	First elected	Results	Candidates
Colorado 1	Diana DeGette	Democratic	1996	Incumbent re-elected.	▌ ✓ Diana DeGette (Democratic) 68.7%; ▌Jesse Thomas (Republican) 27.3%; ▌Richard Combs (Libertarian) 2.8%; ▌Lyle Nasser (Reform) 1.2%
Colorado 2	Mark Udall	Democratic	1998	Incumbent re-elected.	▌ ✓ Mark Udall (Democratic) 55%; ▌Carolyn Cox (Republican) 38.6%; ▌Ron Forthofer (Green) 4.4%; ▌David M. Baker (Libertarian) 2%
Colorado 3	Scott McInnis	Republican	1992	Incumbent re-elected.	▌ ✓ Scott McInnis (Republican) 65.8%; ▌Curtis Imrie (Democratic) 29%; ▌Drew Sakson (Libertarian) 3.3%; ▌Victor Good (Reform) 1.8%
Colorado 4	Bob Schaffer	Republican	1996	Incumbent re-elected.	▌ ✓ Bob Schaffer (Republican) 79.5%; ▌Dan Sewell Ward (Natural Law) 7.5%; ▌Kordon Baker (Libertarian) 7.5%; ▌Leslie J. Hanks (Constitution) 3.8%
Colorado 5	Joel Hefley	Republican	1986	Incumbent re-elected.	▌ ✓ Joel Hefley (Republican) 82.7%; ▌Kerry Kantor (Libertarian) 12.3%; ▌Randy MacKenzie (Natural Law) 5%
Colorado 6	Tom Tancredo	Republican	1998	Incumbent re-elected.	▌ ✓ Tom Tancredo (Republican) 53.9%; ▌Ken Toltz (Democratic) 42.1%; ▌Adam D. Katz (Libertarian) 2.6%; ▌John Heckman (Independent) 1.4%

== Connecticut ==
District	Incumbent			Results	Candidates
District	Member	Party	First elected	Results	Candidates
Connecticut 1	John B. Larson	Democratic	1998	Incumbent re-elected.	▌ ✓ John B. Larson (Democratic) 71%; ▌Bob Backlund (Republican) 29%
Connecticut 2	Sam Gejdenson	Democratic	1980	Incumbent lost re-election. Republican gain.	▌ ✓ Rob Simmons (Republican) 51%; ▌Sam Gejdenson (Democratic) 49%
Connecticut 3	Rosa DeLauro	Democratic	1990	Incumbent re-elected.	▌ ✓ Rosa DeLauro (Democratic) 73%; ▌June Gold (Republican) 27%
Connecticut 4	Chris Shays	Republican	1987 (special)	Incumbent re-elected.	▌ ✓ Chris Shays (Republican) 58%; ▌Stephanie Sanchez (Democratic) 41%
Connecticut 5	Jim Maloney	Democratic	1996	Incumbent re-elected.	▌ ✓ Jim Maloney (Democratic) 54%; ▌Mark Nielsen (Republican) 45%
Connecticut 6	Nancy Johnson	Republican	1982	Incumbent re-elected.	▌ ✓ Nancy Johnson (Republican) 63%; ▌Paul Valenti (Democratic) 33%; ▌Audrey Cole (Green) 3%

== Delaware ==
District	Incumbent			Results	Candidates
District	Member	Party	First elected	Results	Candidates
Delaware at-large	Mike Castle	Republican	1992	Incumbent re-elected.	▌ ✓ Mike Castle (Republican) 68%; ▌Michael Miller (Democratic) 31%; Others: ▌James P. Webster (Constitution) 0.8%; ▌Brad C. Thomas (Libertarian) 0.8%

== Florida ==
District	Incumbent			Results	Candidates
District	Member	Party	First elected	Results	Candidates
Florida 1	Joe Scarborough	Republican	1994	Incumbent re-elected.	▌ ✓ Joe Scarborough (Republican) Uncontested
Florida 2	Allen Boyd	Democratic	1996	Incumbent re-elected.	▌ ✓ Allen Boyd (Democratic) 72%; ▌Doug Dodd (Republican) 28%
Florida 3	Corrine Brown	Democratic	1992	Incumbent re-elected.	▌ ✓ Corrine Brown (Democratic) 58%; ▌Jennifer Carroll (Republican) 42%
Florida 4	Tillie Fowler	Republican	1992	Incumbent retired. Republican hold.	▌ ✓ Ander Crenshaw (Republican) 67%; ▌Tom Sullivan (Democratic) 31.2%; ▌Deborah Katz Pueschel (Independent) 1.8%
Florida 5	Karen Thurman	Democratic	1992	Incumbent re-elected.	▌ ✓ Karen Thurman (Democratic) 64%; ▌Pete Enwall (Republican) 36%
Florida 6	Cliff Stearns	Republican	1988	Incumbent re-elected.	▌ ✓ Cliff Stearns (Republican) Uncontested
Florida 7	John Mica	Republican	1992	Incumbent re-elected.	▌ ✓ John Mica (Republican) 63%; ▌Dan Vaughen (Democratic) 37%
Florida 8	Bill McCollum	Republican	1980	Incumbent retired to run for U.S. Senator. Republican hold.	▌ ✓ Ric Keller (Republican) 51%; ▌Linda Chapin (Democratic) 49%
Florida 9	Michael Bilirakis	Republican	1982	Incumbent re-elected.	▌ ✓ Michael Bilirakis (Republican) 81.9%; ▌Jon Duffey (Reform) 18.1%
Florida 10	Bill Young	Republican	1970	Incumbent re-elected.	▌ ✓ Bill Young (Republican) 75.7%; ▌Josette Green (Natural Law) 13.9%; ▌Randy Heine (Independent) 10.5%
Florida 11	Jim Davis	Democratic	1996	Incumbent re-elected.	▌ ✓ Jim Davis (Democratic) 84.6%; ▌Charlie Westlake (Libertarian) 15.4%
Florida 12	Charles T. Canady	Republican	1992	Incumbent retired. Republican hold.	▌ ✓ Adam Putnam (Republican) 57%; ▌Mike Stedem (Democratic) 43%
Florida 13	Dan Miller	Republican	1992	Incumbent re-elected.	▌ ✓ Dan Miller (Republican) 64%; ▌Daniel Dunn (Democratic) 36%
Florida 14	Porter Goss	Republican	1988	Incumbent re-elected.	▌ ✓ Porter Goss (Republican) 85.2%; ▌Sam Farling (Reform) 14.8%
Florida 15	Dave Weldon	Republican	1994	Incumbent re-elected.	▌ ✓ Dave Weldon (Republican) 58.8%; ▌Patsy Ann Kurth (Democratic) 39.2%; ▌Gerry L Newby (Independent) 1.9%
Florida 16	Mark Foley	Republican	1994	Incumbent re-elected.	▌ ✓ Mark Foley (Republican) 60.2%; ▌Jean Elliott Brown (Democratic) 37.2%; ▌John A. McGuire (Reform) 2.6%
Florida 17	Carrie Meek	Democratic	1992	Incumbent re-elected.	▌ ✓ Carrie Meek (Democratic) Uncontested
Florida 18	Ileana Ros-Lehtinen	Republican	1989	Incumbent re-elected.	▌ ✓ Ileana Ros-Lehtinen (Republican) Uncontested
Florida 19	Robert Wexler	Democratic	1996	Incumbent re-elected.	▌ ✓ Robert Wexler (Democratic) 72%; ▌ Morris Kent Thompson (Republican) 28%
Florida 20	Peter Deutsch	Democratic	1992	Incumbent re-elected.	▌ ✓ Peter Deutsch (Democratic) Uncontested
Florida 21	Lincoln Díaz-Balart	Republican	1992	Incumbent re-elected.	▌ ✓ Lincoln Díaz-Balart (Republican) Uncontested
Florida 22	Clay Shaw	Republican	1980	Incumbent re-elected.	▌ ✓ Clay Shaw (Republican) 50%; ▌ Elaine Bloom (Democratic) 50%
Florida 23	Alcee Hastings	Democratic	1992	Incumbent re-elected.	▌ ✓ Alcee Hastings (Democratic) 76%; ▌ Bill Lambert (Republican) 24%

== Georgia ==
District	Incumbent			Results	Candidates
District	Member	Party	First elected	Results	Candidates
Georgia 1	Jack Kingston	Republican	1992	Incumbent re-elected.	▌ ✓ Jack Kingston (Republican) 69%; ▌Joyce Marie Griggs (Democratic) 31%
Georgia 2	Sanford Bishop	Democratic	1992	Incumbent re-elected.	▌ ✓ Sanford Bishop (Democratic) 53%; ▌Dylan Glenn (Republican) 47%
Georgia 3	Mac Collins	Republican	1992	Incumbent re-elected.	▌ ✓ Mac Collins (Republican) 63%; ▌Gail Notti (Democratic) 37%
Georgia 4	Cynthia McKinney	Democratic	1992	Incumbent re-elected.	▌ ✓ Cynthia McKinney (Democratic) 60%; ▌Sunny Warren (Republican) 40%
Georgia 5	John Lewis	Democratic	1986	Incumbent re-elected.	▌ ✓ John Lewis (Democratic) 77%; ▌Hank Schwab (Republican) 23%
Georgia 6	Johnny Isakson	Republican	1999	Incumbent re-elected.	▌ ✓ Johnny Isakson (Republican) 75%; ▌Brett Dehart (Democratic) 25%
Georgia 7	Bob Barr	Republican	1994	Incumbent re-elected.	▌ ✓ Bob Barr (Republican) 55%; ▌Roger Kahn (Democratic) 45%
Georgia 8	Saxby Chambliss	Republican	1994	Incumbent re-elected.	▌ ✓ Saxby Chambliss (Republican) 59%; ▌Jim Marshall (Democratic) 41%
Georgia 9	Nathan Deal	Republican	1992 (Note: Deal was originally elected as a Democrat. He switched parties in April 1995.)	Incumbent re-elected.	▌ ✓ Nathan Deal (Republican) 75%; ▌James Harrington (Democratic) 25%
Georgia 10	Charlie Norwood	Republican	1994	Incumbent re-elected.	▌ ✓ Charlie Norwood (Republican) 63%; ▌Denise Freeman (Democratic) 37%
Georgia 11	John Linder	Republican	1992	Incumbent re-elected.	▌ ✓ John Linder (Republican) Uncontested

== Hawaii ==
District	Incumbent			Results	Candidates
District	Member	Party	First elected	Results	Candidates
Hawaii 1	Neil Abercrombie	Democratic	1986 (special); 1988 (lost renomination); 1990	Incumbent re-elected.	▌ ✓ Neil Abercrombie (Democratic) 62.3%; ▌Phil Meyers (Republican) 25.8%; ▌Jerry Murphy (Libertarian) 2.1%
Hawaii 2	Patsy Mink	Democratic	1964; 1976 (retired); 1990 (special)	Incumbent re-elected.	▌ ✓ Patsy Mink (Democratic) 57.3%; ▌Russ Francis (Republican) 33.4%; ▌Lawrence G. K. Duquesne (Libertarian) 2.3%

== Idaho ==
District	Incumbent			Results	Candidates
District	Member	Party	First elected	Results	Candidates
Idaho 1	Helen Chenoweth	Republican	1994	Incumbent retired. Republican hold.	▌ ✓ Butch Otter (Republican) 64.8%; ▌Linda Pall (Democratic) 31.4%; ▌Ronald G. Wittig (Libertarian) 2.3%; ▌Kevin Philip Hambsch (Reform) 1.6%
Idaho 2	Mike Simpson	Republican	1998	Incumbent re-elected.	▌ ✓ Mike Simpson (Republican) 70.7%; ▌Craig Williams (Democratic) 25.9%; ▌Donovan Bramwell (Libertarian) 3.4%

== Illinois ==
District	Incumbent			Results	Candidates
District	Member	Party	First elected	Results	Candidates
Illinois 1	Bobby Rush	Democratic	1992	Incumbent re-elected.	▌ ✓ Bobby Rush (Democratic) 88%; ▌Raymond Wardingley (Republican) 12%
Illinois 2	Jesse Jackson Jr.	Democratic	1995	Incumbent re-elected.	▌ ✓ Jesse Jackson Jr. (Democratic) 90%; ▌Robert Gordon (Republican) 10%
Illinois 3	Bill Lipinski	Democratic	1982	Incumbent re-elected.	▌ ✓ Bill Lipinski (Democratic) 76%; ▌Karl Groth (Republican) 24%
Illinois 4	Luis Gutiérrez	Democratic	1992	Incumbent re-elected.	▌ ✓ Luis Gutiérrez (Democratic) 89%; ▌Stephanie Sailor (Independent) 11%
Illinois 5	Rod Blagojevich	Democratic	1996	Incumbent re-elected.	▌ ✓ Rod Blagojevich (Democratic) 88%
Illinois 6	Henry Hyde	Republican	1974	Incumbent re-elected.	▌ ✓ Henry Hyde (Republican) 59%; ▌Brent Christensen (Democratic) 41%
Illinois 7	Danny K. Davis	Democratic	1996	Incumbent re-elected.	▌ ✓ Danny K. Davis (Democratic) 86%; ▌Robert Dallas (Republican) 14%
Illinois 8	Phil Crane	Republican	1969	Incumbent re-elected.	▌ ✓ Phil Crane (Republican) 61%; ▌Lance Pressl (Democratic) 39%
Illinois 9	Jan Schakowsky	Democratic	1998	Incumbent re-elected.	▌ ✓ Jan Schakowsky (Democratic) 76%; ▌Dennis Driscoll (Republican) 24%
Illinois 10	John Porter	Republican	1980	Incumbent retired. Republican hold.	▌ ✓ Mark Kirk (Republican) 51%; ▌Lauren Beth Gash (Democratic) 49%
Illinois 11	Jerry Weller	Republican	1994	Incumbent re-elected.	▌ ✓ Jerry Weller (Republican) 56%; ▌James Stevenson (Democratic) 44%
Illinois 12	Jerry Costello	Democratic	1988	Incumbent re-elected.	▌ ✓ Jerry Costello (Democratic) Uncontested
Illinois 13	Judy Biggert	Republican	1998	Incumbent re-elected.	▌ ✓ Judy Biggert (Republican) 66%; ▌Thomas Mason (Democratic) 34%
Illinois 14	Dennis Hastert	Republican	1986	Incumbent re-elected.	▌ ✓ Dennis Hastert (Republican) 74%; ▌Vern DelJonson (Democratic) 26%
Illinois 15	Thomas W. Ewing	Republican	1998	Incumbent retired. Republican hold.	▌ ✓ Tim Johnson (Republican) 53%; ▌Mike Kelleher (Democratic) 47%
Illinois 16	Don Manzullo	Republican	1992	Incumbent re-elected.	▌ ✓ Don Manzullo (Republican) 67%; ▌Charles Hendrickson (Democratic) 33%
Illinois 17	Lane Evans	Democratic	1982	Incumbent re-elected.	▌ ✓ Lane Evans (Democratic) 55%; ▌Mark Baker (Republican) 45%
Illinois 18	Ray LaHood	Republican	1994	Incumbent re-elected.	▌ ✓ Ray LaHood (Republican) 67%; ▌Joyce Harant (Democratic) 33%
Illinois 19	David D. Phelps	Democratic	1998	Incumbent re-elected.	▌ ✓ David D. Phelps (Democratic) 65%; ▌Jim Eatherly (Republican) 35%
Illinois 20	John Shimkus	Republican	1996	Incumbent re-elected.	▌ ✓ John Shimkus (Republican) 63%; ▌Jeffrey Cooper (Democratic) 37%

== Indiana ==
District	Incumbent			Results	Candidates
District	Member	Party	First elected	Results	Candidates
Indiana 1	Pete Visclosky	Democratic	1984	Incumbent re-elected.	▌ ✓ Pete Visclosky (Democratic) 71.6%; ▌Jack Reynolds (Republican) 27%; ▌Christopher Nelson (Libertarian) 1.4%
Indiana 2	David M. McIntosh	Republican	1994	Incumbent retired to run for Governor of Indiana. Republican hold.	▌ ✓ Mike Pence (Republican) 50.9%; ▌Robert Rock (Democratic) 38.8%; ▌Bill Frazier (Independent) 9.2%; ▌Michael E. Anderson (Libertarian) 1.2%
Indiana 3	Tim Roemer	Democratic	1990	Incumbent re-elected.	▌ ✓ Tim Roemer (Democratic) 51.6%; ▌Chris Chocola (Republican) 47.4%; ▌Scott C. Baker (Libertarian) 1%
Indiana 4	Mark Souder	Republican	1994	Incumbent re-elected.	▌ ✓ Mark Souder (Republican) 62.3%; ▌Michael Dewayne Foster (Democratic) 35.4%; ▌Michael Donlan (Libertarian) 2.3%
Indiana 5	Steve Buyer	Republican	1992	Incumbent re-elected.	▌ ✓ Steve Buyer (Republican) 60.9%; ▌Greg Goodnight (Democratic) 37.5%; ▌Scott Benson (Libertarian) 1.6%
Indiana 6	Dan Burton	Republican	1982	Incumbent re-elected.	▌ ✓ Dan Burton (Republican) 70.3%; ▌Darin Patrick Griesey (Democratic) 26.5%; ▌Joe Hauptmann (Libertarian) 3.2%
Indiana 7	Edward A. Pease	Republican	1996	Incumbent retired. Republican hold.	▌ ✓ Brian Kerns (Republican) 64.8%; ▌Michael Douglas Graf (Democratic) 31.8%; ▌Bob Thayer (Libertarian) 3.4%
Indiana 8	John Hostettler	Republican	1994	Incumbent re-elected.	▌ ✓ John Hostettler (Republican) 52.7%; ▌Paul Perry (Democratic) 45.3%; ▌Thomas Tindle (Libertarian) 2%
Indiana 9	Baron Hill	Democratic	1998	Incumbent re-elected.	▌ ✓ Baron Hill (Democratic) 54.2%; ▌Michael Bailey (Republican) 43.8%; ▌Sara Chambers (Libertarian) 2%
Indiana 10	Julia Carson	Democratic	1996	Incumbent re-elected.	▌ ✓ Julia Carson (Democratic) 58.5%; ▌Marvin Scott (Republican) 39.7%; ▌Na' llah Ali (Libertarian) 1.8%

== Iowa ==
District	Incumbent			Results	Candidates
District	Member	Party	First elected	Results	Candidates
Iowa 1	Jim Leach	Republican	1976	Incumbent re-elected.	▌ ✓ Jim Leach (Republican) 61.8%; ▌Bob Simpson (Democratic) 36.1%; ▌Russ Madden (Libertarian) 2.1%
Iowa 2	Jim Nussle	Republican	1990	Incumbent re-elected.	▌ ✓ Jim Nussle (Republican) 55.4%; ▌Donna Smith (Democratic) 43.7%; ▌Albert W. Schoeman (Libertarian) 0.9%
Iowa 3	Leonard Boswell	Democratic	1996	Incumbent re-elected.	▌ ✓ Leonard Boswell (Democratic) 62.8%; ▌ Jay Marcus (Republican) 33.7%; ▌Sue Atkinson (Independence) 2.2%; ▌Joe Seehusen (Libertarian) 0.9%; ▌Jim Hennager (Earth Federation) 0.3%
Iowa 4	Greg Ganske	Republican	1994	Incumbent re-elected.	▌ ✓ Greg Ganske (Republican) 61.4%; ▌Michael Huston (Democratic) 36.7%; ▌Steve Zimmerman (Libertarian) 1.7%; ▌Edwin B. Fruit (Socialist Workers) 0.2%
Iowa 5	Tom Latham	Republican	1994	Incumbent re-elected.	▌ ✓ Tom Latham (Republican) 68.8%; ▌Mike Palecek (Democratic) 29.2%; ▌Ben L. Olson (Libertarian) 1.2%; ▌Ray Holtorf (Independent) 0.8%

== Kansas ==
District	Incumbent			Results	Candidates
District	Member	Party	First elected	Results	Candidates
Kansas 1	Jerry Moran	Republican	1996	Incumbent re-elected.	▌ ✓ Jerry Moran (Republican) 89.3%; ▌Jack Warner (Libertarian) 10.7%
Kansas 2	Jim Ryun	Republican	1996	Incumbent re-elected.	▌ ✓ Jim Ryun (Republican) 67.4%; ▌Stanley Wiles (Democratic) 29.3%; ▌Dennis Hawver (Libertarian) 3.3%
Kansas 3	Dennis Moore	Democratic	1998	Incumbent re-elected.	▌ ✓ Dennis Moore (Democratic) 50%; ▌Phill Kline (Republican) 46.9%; ▌Chris Mina (Libertarian) 3.1%
Kansas 4	Todd Tiahrt	Republican	1994	Incumbent re-elected.	▌ ✓ Todd Tiahrt (Republican) 54.4%; ▌Carlos Nolla (Democratic) 42%; ▌Steven A. Rosile (Libertarian) 3.6%

== Kentucky ==
District	Incumbent			Results	Candidates
District	Member	Party	First elected	Results	Candidates
Kentucky 1	Ed Whitfield	Republican	1994	Incumbent re-elected.	▌ ✓ Ed Whitfield (Republican) 58.0%; ▌Brian S. Roy (Democratic) 42.0%
Kentucky 2	Ron Lewis	Republican	1994	Incumbent re-elected.	▌ ✓ Ron Lewis (Republican) 67.7%; ▌Brian Pedigo (Democratic) 31.4%; ▌Michael A. Kirkman (Libertarian) 0.9%
Kentucky 3	Anne Northup	Republican	1996	Incumbent re-elected.	▌ ✓ Anne Northup (Republican) 52.9%; ▌Eleanor Jordan (Democratic) 44.2%; ▌Donna Walker Mancini (Libertarian) 2.9%
Kentucky 4	Ken Lucas	Democratic	1998	Incumbent re-elected.	▌ ✓ Ken Lucas (Democratic) 54.3%; ▌Don Bell (Republican) 43.5%; ▌Ken Sain (Green) 1.6%; ▌Alan Handleman (Libertarian) 0.6%
Kentucky 5	Hal Rogers	Republican	1980	Incumbent re-elected.	▌ ✓ Hal Rogers (Republican) 73.6%; ▌Sidney Jane Bailey (Democratic) 26.4%
Kentucky 6	Ernie Fletcher	Republican	1998	Incumbent re-elected.	▌ ✓ Ernie Fletcher (Republican) 52.8%; ▌Scotty Baesler (Democratic) 34.8%; ▌Gatewood Galbraith (Reform) 12.0%; ▌Joseph Novak (Libertarian) 0.5%

== Louisiana ==
District	Incumbent			Results	Candidates
District	Member	Party	First elected	Results	Candidates
Louisiana 1	David Vitter	Republican	1999 (special)	Incumbent re-elected.	▌ ✓ David Vitter (Republican) 80%; ▌Michael Armato (Democratic) 13%; ▌Cary Deaton (Democratic) 5%; ▌Martin Rosenthal (Independent) 1%; ▌John Paul Simanonok (Independent) 1%
Louisiana 2	William J. Jefferson	Democratic	1990	Incumbent re-elected.	▌ ✓ William J. Jefferson (Democratic) Uncontested
Louisiana 3	Billy Tauzin	Republican	1980 (Note: Tauzin was first elected as a Democrat. He switched to the Republican Party in August 1995.)	Incumbent re-elected.	▌ ✓ Billy Tauzin (Republican) 78%; ▌Eddie Albares (Independent) 9%; ▌Anita Rosenthal (Independent) 7%; ▌Dion Bourque (Independent) 6%
Louisiana 4	Jim McCrery	Republican	1988	Incumbent re-elected.	▌ ✓ Jim McCrery (Republican) 71%; ▌Phillip Green (Democratic) 25%; ▌Mike Taylor (Independent) 2%; ▌James Ronald Skains (Independent) 2%
Louisiana 5	John Cooksey	Republican	1996	Incumbent re-elected.	▌ ✓ John Cooksey (Republican) 69%; ▌Roger Beall (Democratic) 24%; ▌Sam Houston Melton (Independent) 4%; ▌Chuck Dumas (Independent) 3%
Louisiana 6	Richard Baker	Republican	1986	Incumbent re-elected.	▌ ✓ Richard Baker (Republican) 68%; ▌Kathy Rogillio (Democratic) 30%; ▌Michael Wolf (Independent) 2%
Louisiana 7	Chris John	Democratic	1996	Incumbent re-elected.	▌ ✓ Chris John (Democratic) 84%; ▌Michael Harris (Independent) 16%

== Maine ==
District	Incumbent			Results	Candidates
District	Member	Party	First elected	Results	Candidates
Maine 1	Tom Allen	Democratic	1996	Incumbent re-elected.	▌ ✓ Tom Allen (Democratic) 59.8%; ▌Jane Amero (Republican) 36.5%; ▌J. Frederic Staples (Libertarian) 3.6%
Maine 2	John Baldacci	Democratic	1994	Incumbent re-elected.	▌ ✓ John Baldacci (Democratic) 73.4%; ▌Richard Campbell (Republican) 26.6%

== Maryland ==
District	Incumbent			Results	Candidates
District	Member	Party	First elected	Results	Candidates
Maryland 1	Wayne Gilchrest	Republican	1990	Incumbent re-elected.	▌ ✓ Wayne Gilchrest (Republican) 64%; ▌Bennett Bozman (Democratic) 36%
Maryland 2	Bob Ehrlich	Republican	1994	Incumbent re-elected.	▌ ✓ Bob Ehrlich (Republican) 69%; ▌Kenneth Bosley (Democratic) 31%
Maryland 3	Ben Cardin	Democratic	1986	Incumbent re-elected.	▌ ✓ Ben Cardin (Democratic) 76%; ▌Colin Harby (Republican) 24%
Maryland 4	Albert Wynn	Democratic	1992	Incumbent re-elected.	▌ ✓ Albert Wynn (Democratic) 88%; ▌John B. Kimble (Republican) 12%
Maryland 5	Steny Hoyer	Democratic	1981	Incumbent re-elected.	▌ ✓ Steny Hoyer (Democratic) 65%; ▌Thomas Hutchins (Republican) 35%
Maryland 6	Roscoe Bartlett	Republican	1992	Incumbent re-elected.	▌ ✓ Roscoe Bartlett (Republican) 61%; ▌ Donald DeArmon (Democratic) 39%
Maryland 7	Elijah Cummings	Democratic	1996	Incumbent re-elected.	▌ ✓ Elijah Cummings (Democratic) 87%; ▌Kenneth Kondner (Republican) 13%
Maryland 8	Connie Morella	Republican	1986	Incumbent re-elected.	▌ ✓ Connie Morella (Republican) 52%; ▌Terry Lierman (Democratic) 46%

== Massachusetts ==
District	Incumbent			Results	Candidates
District	Member	Party	First elected	Results	Candidates
Massachusetts 1	John Olver	Democratic	1991	Incumbent re-elected.	▌ ✓ John Olver (Democratic) 69%; ▌Peter Abair (Republican) 30%
Massachusetts 2	Richard Neal	Democratic	1988	Incumbent re-elected.	▌ ✓ Richard Neal (Democratic) Uncontested
Massachusetts 3	Jim McGovern	Democratic	1996	Incumbent re-elected.	▌ ✓ Jim McGovern (Democratic) Uncontested
Massachusetts 4	Barney Frank	Democratic	1980	Incumbent re-elected.	▌ ✓ Barney Frank (Democratic) 71%; ▌Martin Travis (Republican) 21%
Massachusetts 5	Marty Meehan	Democratic	1992	Incumbent re-elected.	▌ ✓ Marty Meehan (Democratic) Uncontested
Massachusetts 6	John F. Tierney	Democratic	1996	Incumbent re-elected.	▌ ✓ John F. Tierney (Democratic) 71%; ▌Paul McCarthy (Republican) 29%
Massachusetts 7	Ed Markey	Democratic	1976	Incumbent re-elected.	▌ ✓ Ed Markey (Democratic) Uncontested
Massachusetts 8	Mike Capuano	Democratic	1998	Incumbent re-elected.	▌ ✓ Mike Capuano (Democratic) Uncontested
Massachusetts 9	Joe Moakley	Democratic	1972	Incumbent re-elected.	▌ ✓ Joe Moakley (Democratic) 78%; ▌Janet Jeghelian (Republican) 20%
Massachusetts 10	Bill Delahunt	Democratic	1996	Incumbent re-elected.	▌ ✓ Bill Delahunt (Democratic) 74%; ▌Eric Bleicken (Republican) 26%

== Michigan ==
District	Incumbent			Results	Candidates
District	Member	Party	First elected	Results	Candidates
Michigan 1	Bart Stupak	Democratic	1992	Incumbent re-elected.	▌ ✓ Bart Stupak (Democratic) 59%; ▌Chuck Yob (Republican) 41%
Michigan 2	Pete Hoekstra	Republican	1992	Incumbent re-elected.	▌ ✓ Pete Hoekstra (Republican) 65%; ▌Bob Shrauger (Democratic) 34%
Michigan 3	Vern Ehlers	Republican	1993	Incumbent re-elected.	▌ ✓ Vern Ehlers (Republican) 65%; ▌Timothy Steele (Democratic) 34%
Michigan 4	David Lee Camp	Republican	1990	Incumbent re-elected.	▌ ✓ David Lee Camp (Republican) 68%; ▌Lawrence Hollenbeck (Democratic) 30%; ▌Alan Gamble (Green) 1%
Michigan 5	James A. Barcia	Democratic	1992	Incumbent re-elected.	▌ ✓ James A. Barcia (Democratic) 75%; ▌Ronald Actis (Republican) 24%
Michigan 6	Fred Upton	Republican	1986	Incumbent re-elected.	▌ ✓ Fred Upton (Republican) 68%; ▌James Bupp (Democratic) 30%
Michigan 7	Nick Smith	Republican	1992	Incumbent re-elected.	▌ ✓ Nick Smith (Republican) 62%; ▌Jennie Crittendon (Democratic) 36%
Michigan 8	Debbie Stabenow	Democratic	1996	Incumbent retired to run for U.S. Senator. Republican gain.	▌ ✓ Mike Rogers (Republican) 49%; ▌Dianne Byrum (Democratic) 49%; ▌Bonnie Bucqueroux (Green) 1%
Michigan 9	Dale E. Kildee	Democratic	1976	Incumbent re-elected.	▌ ✓ Dale E. Kildee (Democratic) 62%; ▌Grant Garrett (Republican) 36%
Michigan 10	David Bonior	Democratic	1976	Incumbent re-elected.	▌ ✓ David Bonior (Democratic) 65%; ▌Tom Turner (Republican) 34%
Michigan 11	Joe Knollenberg	Republican	1992	Incumbent re-elected.	▌ ✓ Joe Knollenberg (Republican) 56%; ▌Matthew Frumin (Democratic) 41%; ▌Marilyn MacDermaid (Green) 1%
Michigan 12	Sander Levin	Democratic	1982	Incumbent re-elected.	▌ ✓ Sander Levin (Democratic) 65%; ▌Bart Baron (Republican) 33%; ▌Tom Ness (Green) 2%
Michigan 13	Lynn N. Rivers	Democratic	1994	Incumbent re-elected.	▌ ✓ Lynn N. Rivers (Democratic) 65%; ▌Carl Barry (Republican) 33%
Michigan 14	John Conyers Jr.	Democratic	1964	Incumbent re-elected.	▌ ✓ John Conyers Jr. (Democratic) 90%; ▌William Ashe (Republican) 10%
Michigan 15	Carolyn Cheeks Kilpatrick	Democratic	1996	Incumbent re-elected.	▌ ✓ Carolyn Cheeks Kilpatrick (Democratic) 90%; ▌Chrysanthea Boyd-Fields (Republican) 10%
Michigan 16	John D. Dingell Jr.	Democratic	1955	Incumbent re-elected.	▌ ✓ John D. Dingell Jr. (Democratic) 71%; ▌William Morse (Republican) 27%

== Minnesota ==
District	Incumbent			Results	Candidates
District	Member	Party	First elected	Results	Candidates
Minnesota 1	Gil Gutknecht	Republican	1994	Incumbent re-elected.	▌ ✓ Gil Gutknecht (Republican) 56.4%; ▌Mary Rieder (DFL) 41.6%; ▌Rich Osness (Libertarian) 1.9%
Minnesota 2	David Minge	DFL	1992	Incumbent lost re-election. Republican gain.	▌ ✓ Mark Kennedy (Republican) 48.1%; ▌David Minge (DFL) 48.0%; ▌Gerald W. Brekke (Independence) 2.7%; ▌Ron Helwig (Libertarian) 0.7%; ▌Dennis A. Burda (Constitution) 0.5%
Minnesota 3	Jim Ramstad	Republican	1990	Incumbent re-elected.	▌ ✓ Jim Ramstad (Republican) 67.6%; ▌Sue Shuff (DFL) 29.9%; ▌Bob Odden (Libertarian) 1.6%; ▌Arne Niksa (Constitution) 0.9%
Minnesota 4	Vacant			Rep. Bruce Vento (DFL) died October 10, 2000. DFL hold.	▌ ✓ Betty McCollum (DFL) 48.0%; ▌Linda Runbeck (Republican) 30.9%; ▌Tom Foley (Independence) 20.6%; ▌Nicholas Skrivanek (Constitution) 0.5%
Minnesota 5	Martin Olav Sabo	DFL	1978	Incumbent re-elected.	▌ ✓ Martin Olav Sabo (DFL) 69.2%; ▌ Frank Taylor (Republican) 22.8%; ▌Rob Tomich (Independence) 4.4%; ▌Renee Lavoi (Constitution) 1.8%; ▌Chuck P. Charnstrom (Libertarian) 1.8%
Minnesota 6	Bill Luther	DFL	1994	Incumbent re-elected.	▌ ✓ Bill Luther (DFL) 49.6%; ▌John Kline (Republican) 48.0%; ▌Ralph A. Hubbard (Constitution) 2.4%
Minnesota 7	Collin Peterson	DFL	1990	Incumbent re-elected.	▌ ✓ Collin Peterson (DFL) 68.7%; ▌Glen Menze (Republican) 29.3%; ▌Owen Siverston (Constitution) 2.1%
Minnesota 8	Jim Oberstar	DFL	1974	Incumbent re-elected.	▌ ✓ Jim Oberstar (DFL) 67.9%; ▌Bob Lemen (Republican) 25.8%; ▌Mike Darling (Independent) 6.4%

== Mississippi ==
District	Incumbent			Results	Candidates
District	Member	Party	First elected	Results	Candidates
Mississippi 1	Roger Wicker	Republican	1994	Incumbent re-elected.	▌ ✓ Roger Wicker (Republican) 69.8%; ▌Joey Grist (Democratic) 28.6%; ▌Chris Lawrence (Libertarian) 1.6%
Mississippi 2	Bennie Thompson	Democratic	1993	Incumbent re-elected.	▌ ✓ Bennie Thompson (Democratic) 65.1%; ▌Hardy Caraway (Republican) 31.2%; ▌William G. Chipman (Libertarian) 2.5%; ▌Lee F. Dilworth (Reform) 1.2%
Mississippi 3	Chip Pickering	Republican	1996	Incumbent re-elected.	▌ ✓ Chip Pickering (Republican) 73.2%; ▌William Clay Thrash (Democratic) 25.7%; ▌Jonathan Golden (Libertarian) 1.1%
Mississippi 4	Ronnie Shows	Democratic	1998	Incumbent re-elected.	▌ ✓ Ronnie Shows (Democratic) 58.1%; ▌Dunn Lampton (Republican) 39.8%; ▌Ernie John Hopkins (Libertarian) 1.3%; ▌Betty Pharr (Reform) 0.8%
Mississippi 5	Gene Taylor	Democratic	1989	Incumbent re-elected.	▌ ✓ Gene Taylor (Democratic) 78.8%; ▌Randy McDonnell (Republican) 18.2%; ▌Wayne L. Parker (Libertarian) 1.5%; ▌Katie Perrone (Reform) 1.5%

== Missouri ==
District	Incumbent			Results	Candidates
District	Member	Party	First elected	Results	Candidates
Missouri 1	Bill Clay	Democratic	1968	Incumbent retired. Democratic hold.	▌ ✓ Lacy Clay (Democratic) 76%; ▌ Dwight Billingsly (Republican) 22%; ▌ Brenda Reddick (Green) 2%
Missouri 2	Jim Talent	Republican	1992	Incumbent retired to run for Governor of Missouri. Republican hold.	▌ ✓ Todd Akin (Republican) 56%; ▌Ted House (Democratic) 43%; ▌Mike Odell (Green) 1%
Missouri 3	Dick Gephardt	Democratic	1976	Incumbent re-elected.	▌ ✓ Dick Gephardt (Democratic) 58%; ▌Bill Federer (Republican) 40%; ▌Mary Maroney (Green) 1%
Missouri 4	Ike Skelton	Democratic	1976	Incumbent re-elected.	▌ ✓ Ike Skelton (Democratic) 67%; ▌Jim Noland (Republican) 32%
Missouri 5	Karen McCarthy	Democratic	1994	Incumbent re-elected.	▌ ✓ Karen McCarthy (Democratic) 69%; ▌Steve Gordon (Republican) 29%; ▌Charles Reitz (Green) 1%
Missouri 6	Pat Danner	Democratic	1992	Incumbent retired. Republican gain.	▌ ✓ Sam Graves (Republican) 51%; ▌Steve Danner (Democratic) 47%
Missouri 7	Roy Blunt	Republican	1996	Incumbent re-elected.	▌ ✓ Roy Blunt (Republican) 74%; ▌Charles Christrup (Democratic) 24%
Missouri 8	Jo Ann Emerson	Republican	1996	Incumbent re-elected.	▌ ✓ Jo Ann Emerson (Republican) 70%; ▌Bob Camp (Democratic) 29%; ▌Tom Sager (Green) 1%
Missouri 9	Kenny Hulshof	Republican	1996	Incumbent re-elected.	▌ ✓ Kenny Hulshof (Republican) 60%; ▌Steven Carroll (Democratic) 39%; ▌Devin Scherubel (Green) 1%

== Montana ==
District	Incumbent			Results	Candidates
District	Member	Party	First elected	Results	Candidates
Montana at-large	Rick Hill	Republican	1996	Incumbent retired. Republican hold.	▌ ✓ Denny Rehberg (Republican) 51.5%; ▌Nancy Keenan (Democratic) 46.3%; ▌James Tikalsky (Libertarian) 2.2%

== Nebraska ==
District	Incumbent			Results	Candidates
District	Member	Party	First elected	Results	Candidates
Nebraska 1	Doug Bereuter	Republican	1978	Incumbent re-elected.	▌ ✓ Doug Bereuter (Republican) 66.2%; ▌Alan Jacobsen (Democratic) 31%; ▌David Oenbring (Libertarian) 2.6%
Nebraska 2	Lee Terry	Republican	1998	Incumbent re-elected.	▌ ✓ Lee Terry (Republican) 65.8%; ▌Shelley Kiel (Democratic) 31%; ▌John Graziano (Libertarian) 3%
Nebraska 3	Bill Barrett	Republican	1990	Incumbent retired. Republican hold.	▌ ✓ Tom Osborne (Republican) 82%; ▌Roland Reynolds (Democratic) 15.7%; ▌Jerry Hickman (Libertarian) 2.2%

== Nevada ==
District	Incumbent			Results	Candidates
District	Member	Party	First elected	Results	Candidates
Nevada 1	Shelley Berkley	Democratic	1998	Incumbent re-elected.	▌ ✓ Shelley Berkley (Democratic) 52%; ▌Jon Porter (Republican) 45%
Nevada 2	Jim Gibbons	Republican	1996	Incumbent re-elected.	▌ ✓ Jim Gibbons (Republican) 64%; ▌Tierney Cahill (Democratic) 30%; ▌Charles Laws (Green) 2%

== New Hampshire ==
District	Incumbent			Results	Candidates
District	Member	Party	First elected	Results	Candidates
New Hampshire 1	John E. Sununu	Republican	1996	Incumbent re-elected.	▌ ✓ John E. Sununu (Republican) 52.9%; ▌Martha Fuller Clark (Democratic) 45.1%; ▌Dan Belforti (Libertarian) 2%
New Hampshire 2	Charles Bass	Republican	1994	Incumbent re-elected.	▌ ✓ Charlie Bass (Republican) 56.2%; ▌Barney Brannen (Democratic) 40.7%; ▌Brian Christeson (Libertarian) 2.3%; ▌Roy Kendel (Constitution) 0.8%

== New Jersey ==
District	Incumbent			Results	Candidates
District	Member	Party	First elected	Results	Candidates
New Jersey 1	Rob Andrews	Democratic	1990	Incumbent re-elected.	▌ ✓ Rob Andrews (Democratic) 76.2%; ▌Charlene Cathcart (Republican) 21.2%; ▌Catherine Parrish (Green) 1.4%; ▌Ed Forchion (Legalize Marijuana) 0.9%; ▌Joseph A Patalivo (Conservative) 0.4%
New Jersey 2	Frank LoBiondo	Republican	1994	Incumbent re-elected.	▌ ✓ Frank LoBiondo (Republican) 66.4%; ▌Edward Janosik (Democratic) 31.9%; ▌Robert Gabrielsky (Green) 1.4%; ▌Costantino Rozzo (Socialist) 0.3%
New Jersey 3	Jim Saxton	Republican	1984	Incumbent re-elected.	▌ ✓ Jim Saxton (Republican) 57.3%; ▌Susan Bass Levin (Democratic) 41.2%; ▌Aaron M. Kromash (Green) 0.9%; ▌Ken Feduniewicz (Reform) 0.4%; ▌Norman Wahner (Conservative) 0.3%
New Jersey 4	Chris Smith	Republican	1980	Incumbent re-elected.	▌ ✓ Chris Smith (Republican) 63.2%; ▌Reed Gusciora (Democratic) 35.1%; ▌Stuart Chaifetz (Green) 1.5%; ▌Paul D. Teel (Independent) 0.3%
New Jersey 5	Marge Roukema	Republican	1980	Incumbent re-elected.	▌ ✓ Marge Roukema (Republican) 65.4%; ▌Linda Mercurio (Democratic) 30.4%; ▌Michael King (Green) 2.0%; ▌Robert J. McCafferty (Independent) 1.5%; ▌Ira W. Goodman (Reform) 0.5%; ▌Helen Hamilton (Natural Law) 0.2%
New Jersey 6	Frank Pallone	Democratic	1988	Incumbent re-elected.	▌ ✓ Frank Pallone (Democratic) 67.5%; ▌Brian T. Kennedy (Republican) 29.8%; ▌Earl Gray (Green) 2.0%; ▌Karen Zaletel (Reform) 0.5%; ▌Sylvia Kuzmak (Conservative) 0.2%
New Jersey 7	Bob Franks	Republican	1992	Incumbent retired to run for U.S. Senator. Republican hold.	▌ ✓ Mike Ferguson (Republican) 51.8%; ▌Maryanne Connelly (Democratic) 45.3%; ▌Jerry L. Coleman (Green) 2.2%; ▌Darren Young (Libertarian) 0.4%; ▌Shawn Gianella (Conservative) 0.2%; ▌Mary T. Johnson (Natural Law) 0.1%
New Jersey 8	Bill Pascrell	Democratic	1996	Incumbent re-elected.	▌ ✓ Bill Pascrell (Democratic) 67.0%; ▌Anthony Fusco (Republican) 30.3%; ▌Joseph Fortunato (Green) 2.2%; ▌Viji Sargis (Independent) 0.5%
New Jersey 9	Steve Rothman	Democratic	1996	Incumbent re-elected.	▌ ✓ Steve Rothman (Democratic) 67.9%; ▌Joseph Tedeschi (Republican) 30.0%; ▌Lewis Pell (Green) 1.1%; ▌Michael Perrone Jr. (Independent) 0.5%; ▌Robert Corriston (Conservative) 0.5%
New Jersey 10	Donald M. Payne	Democratic	1988	Incumbent re-elected.	▌ ✓ Donald M. Payne (Democratic) 87.5%; ▌Dirk Weber (Republican) 12.1%; ▌Maurice Williams (Socialist Workers) 0.4%
New Jersey 11	Rodney Frelinghuysen	Republican	1994	Incumbent re-elected.	▌ ✓ Rodney Frelinghuysen (Republican) 68.0%; ▌John Scollo (Democratic) 29.6%; ▌John Piekarski (Green) 1.9%; ▌James E. Spinosa (Conservative) 0.6%
New Jersey 12	Rush Holt Jr.	Democratic	1998	Incumbent re-elected.	▌ ✓ Rush Holt Jr. (Democratic) 48.7%; ▌Dick Zimmer (Republican) 48.5%; ▌Carl Mayer (Green) 1.9%; ▌John P. Desmond (Conservative) 0.4%; ▌Worth Winslow (Libertarian) 0.4%
New Jersey 13	Bob Menendez	Democratic	1992	Incumbent re-elected.	▌ ✓ Bob Menendez (Democratic) 78.7%; ▌Theresa de Leon (Republican) 18.6%; ▌Claudette Meliere (Green) 1.8%; ▌Dick Hester (Constitution) 0.4%; ▌Herbert Shaw (Independent) 0.2%; ▌ Alina Fonteboa (Independent) 0.2%; ▌Kari Sachs (Socialist Workers) 0.1%

== New Mexico ==
District	Incumbent			Results	Candidates
District	Member	Party	First elected	Results	Candidates
New Mexico 1	Heather Wilson	Republican	1998	Incumbent re-elected.	▌ ✓ Heather Wilson (Republican) 51%; ▌John Kelly (Democratic) 44%; ▌Dan Kerlinsky (Green) 6%
New Mexico 2	Joe Skeen	Republican	1980	Incumbent re-elected.	▌ ✓ Joe Skeen (Republican) 58%; ▌Michael Montoya (Democratic) 42%
New Mexico 3	Tom Udall	Democratic	1998	Incumbent re-elected.	▌ ✓ Tom Udall (Democratic) 67%; ▌Lisa L. Lutz (Republican) 33%

== New York ==
District	Incumbent			Results	Candidates
District	Member	Party	First elected	Results	Candidates
New York 1	Michael Forbes	Democratic	1994 (Note: Forbes was first elected as a Republican. He switched to the Democratic Party in July 1999.)	Incumbent lost re-election as inactive nominee of New York Working Families party . Republican gain.	▌ ✓ Felix Grucci (Republican) 56%; ▌Regina Seltzer (Democratic) 41%; ▌Michael Forbes (Independent) 3%
New York 2	Rick Lazio	Republican	1992	Incumbent retired to run for U.S. Senator. Democratic gain.	▌ ✓ Steve Israel (Democratic) 48%; ▌Joan Johnson (Republican) 34%; ▌Robert Walsh (Independent) 6%; ▌Richard Thompson (Independent) 6%; ▌David Bishop (Independent) 6%
New York 3	Peter T. King	Republican	1992	Incumbent re-elected.	▌ ✓ Peter T. King (Republican) 60%; ▌Dal Lamagna (Democratic) 40%
New York 4	Carolyn McCarthy	Democratic	1996	Incumbent re-elected.	▌ ✓ Carolyn McCarthy (Democratic) 61%; ▌Gregory Becker (Republican) 39%
New York 5	Gary Ackerman	Democratic	1983	Incumbent re-elected.	▌ ✓ Gary Ackerman (Democratic) 68%; ▌Edward Elkowitz (Republican) 31%
New York 6	Gregory W. Meeks	Democratic	1998	Incumbent re-elected.	▌ ✓ Gregory W. Meeks (Democratic) Uncontested
New York 7	Joseph Crowley	Democratic	1998	Incumbent re-elected.	▌ ✓ Joseph Crowley (Democratic) 71%; ▌Rose Birtley (Republican) 23%; ▌Paul Gilman (Green) 1%
New York 8	Jerrold Nadler	Democratic	1992	Incumbent re-elected.	▌ ✓ Jerrold Nadler (Democratic) 81%; ▌Marian Henry (Republican) 16%; ▌Dan Wentzel (Green) 3%
New York 9	Anthony Weiner	Democratic	1998	Incumbent re-elected.	▌ ✓ Anthony Weiner (Democratic) 68%; ▌Noach Dear (Republican) 32%
New York 10	Edolphus Towns	Democratic	1982	Incumbent re-elected.	▌ ✓ Edolphus Towns (Democratic) 90%; ▌Ernestine Brown (Republican) 6%
New York 11	Major Owens	Democratic	1982	Incumbent re-elected.	▌ ✓ Major Owens (Democratic) 88%; ▌Susan Cleary (Republican) 7%
New York 12	Nydia Velázquez	Democratic	1992	Incumbent re-elected.	▌ ✓ Nydia Velázquez (Democratic) 86%; ▌Rosemarie Markgraf (Republican) 12%
New York 13	Vito Fossella	Republican	1997	Incumbent re-elected.	▌ ✓ Vito Fossella (Republican) 65%; ▌Katina Johnstone (Democratic) 34%
New York 14	Carolyn Maloney	Democratic	1992	Incumbent re-elected.	▌ ✓ Carolyn Maloney (Democratic) 74%; ▌Carla Rhodes (Republican) 23%; ▌Sandy Stevens (Green) 2%
New York 15	Charles B. Rangel	Democratic	1970	Incumbent re-elected.	▌ ✓ Charles B. Rangel (Democratic) 91%; ▌Jose Augustin Suero (Republican) 6%; ▌Dean Loren (Green) 2%
New York 16	José E. Serrano	Democratic	1990	Incumbent re-elected.	▌ ✓ José E. Serrano (Democratic) 96%; ▌Aaron Justice (Republican) 4%
New York 17	Eliot Engel	Democratic	1988	Incumbent re-elected.	▌ ✓ Eliot Engel (Democratic) 89%; ▌Patrick McManus (Republican) 11%
New York 18	Nita Lowey	Democratic	1988	Incumbent re-elected.	▌ ✓ Nita Lowey (Democratic) 67%; ▌John Vonglis (Republican) 32%
New York 19	Sue W. Kelly	Republican	1994	Incumbent re-elected.	▌ ✓ Sue W. Kelly (Republican) 61%; ▌Lawrence Otis Graham (Democratic) 36%; ▌Mark Jacobs (Green) 2%
New York 20	Benjamin A. Gilman	Republican	1972	Incumbent re-elected.	▌ ✓ Benjamin A. Gilman (Republican) 58%; ▌Paul Feiner (Democratic) 41%
New York 21	Michael R. McNulty	Democratic	1988	Incumbent re-elected.	▌ ✓ Michael R. McNulty (Democratic) 74%; ▌Thomas Pillsworth (Republican) 26%
New York 22	John E. Sweeney	Republican	1998	Incumbent re-elected.	▌ ✓ John E. Sweeney (Republican) 69%; ▌Kenneth McCallion (Democratic) 31%
New York 23	Sherwood Boehlert	Republican	1982	Incumbent re-elected.	▌ ✓ Sherwood Boehlert (Republican) 60%; ▌Richard Englebrecht (Democratic) 20%
New York 24	John M. McHugh	Republican	1992	Incumbent re-elected.	▌ ✓ John M. McHugh (Republican) 75%; ▌Neil Tallon (Democratic) 23%
New York 25	James T. Walsh	Republican	1988	Incumbent re-elected.	▌ ✓ James T. Walsh (Republican) 69%; ▌Francis Gavin (Democratic) 30%; ▌Howie Hawkins (Green) 2%
New York 26	Maurice Hinchey	Democratic	1992	Incumbent re-elected.	▌ ✓ Maurice Hinchey (Democratic) 62%; ▌Bob Moppert (Republican) 38%
New York 27	Thomas M. Reynolds	Republican	1998	Incumbent re-elected.	▌ ✓ Thomas M. Reynolds (Republican) 70%; ▌Thomas Pecoraro (Democratic) 30%
New York 28	Louise Slaughter	Democratic	1986	Incumbent re-elected.	▌ ✓ Louise Slaughter (Democratic) 66%; ▌Mark Johns (Republican) 33%; ▌Eve Hawkins (Green) 1%
New York 29	John J. LaFalce	Democratic	1974	Incumbent re-elected.	▌ ✓ John J. LaFalce (Democratic) 61%; ▌Brett Sommer (Republican) 39%
New York 30	Jack Quinn	Republican	1992	Incumbent re-elected.	▌ ✓ Jack Quinn (Republican) 67%; ▌John Fee (Democratic) 33%
New York 31	Amo Houghton	Republican	1986	Incumbent re-elected.	▌ ✓ Amo Houghton (Republican) 77%; ▌Kisun Peters (Democratic) 23%

== North Carolina ==
District	Incumbent			Results	Candidates
District	Member	Party	First elected	Results	Candidates
North Carolina 1	Eva Clayton	Democratic	1992	Incumbent re-elected.	▌ ✓ Eva Clayton (Democratic) 65.6%; ▌Duane Kratzer (Republican) 32.9%; ▌Christopher Sean Delaney (Libertarian) 1.5%
North Carolina 2	Bob Etheridge	Democratic	1996	Incumbent re-elected.	▌ ✓ Bob Etheridge (Democratic) 58.3%; ▌Doug Haynes (Republican) 40.9%; ▌Mark Daniel Jackson (Libertarian) 0.8%
North Carolina 3	Walter B. Jones Jr.	Republican	1994	Incumbent re-elected.	▌ ✓ Walter B. Jones Jr. (Republican) 61.4%; ▌Leigh Harvey McNairy (Democratic) 37.3%; ▌Leigh Harvey McNairy (Libertarian) 1.2%
North Carolina 4	David Price	Democratic	1986; 1994 (defeated); 1996	Incumbent re-elected.	▌ ✓ David Price (Democratic) 61.6%; ▌Jess Ward (Republican) 36.6%; ▌C. Brian Towey (Libertarian) 1.7%
North Carolina 5	Richard Burr	Republican	1994	Incumbent re-elected.	▌ ✓ Richard Burr (Republican) 92.8%; ▌Steven Francis LeBoeuf (Libertarian) 7.2%
North Carolina 6	Howard Coble	Republican	1984	Incumbent re-elected.	▌ ✓ Howard Coble (Republican) 91%; ▌Jeffrey Dean Bentley (Libertarian) 8.7%
North Carolina 7	Mike McIntyre	Democratic	1996	Incumbent re-elected.	▌ ✓ Mike McIntyre (Democratic) 69.7%; ▌James Adams (Republican) 28.9%; ▌Bob Burns (Libertarian) 1.3%
North Carolina 8	Robin Hayes	Republican	1998	Incumbent re-elected.	▌ ✓ Robin Hayes (Republican) 55%; ▌Mike Taylor (Democratic) 44%; ▌Jack Schwartz (Libertarian) 1%
North Carolina 9	Sue Myrick	Republican	1994	Incumbent re-elected.	▌ ✓ Sue Myrick (Republican) 68.6%; ▌Ed McGuire (Democratic) 30%; ▌Christopher Cole (Libertarian) 0.9%; ▌James Cahaney (Reform) 0.5%
North Carolina 10	Cass Ballenger	Republican	1986	Incumbent re-elected.	▌ ✓ Cass Ballenger (Republican) 68.2%; ▌Delmas Parker (Democratic) 29.5%; ▌Deborah Garrett Eddins (Libertarian) 2.3%
North Carolina 11	Charles H. Taylor	Republican	1990	Incumbent re-elected.	▌ ✓ Charles H. Taylor (Republican) 55.1%; ▌Sam Neill (Democratic) 42.1%; ▌Charles Barry Williams (Libertarian) 2.8%
North Carolina 12	Mel Watt	Democratic	1992	Incumbent re-elected.	▌ ✓ Mel Watt (Democratic) 64.8%; ▌Chad Mitchell (Republican) 33.3%; ▌Anna Lyon (Libertarian) 1.9%

== North Dakota ==
District	Incumbent			Results	Candidates
District	Member	Party	First elected	Results	Candidates
North Dakota at-large	Earl Pomeroy	Democratic-NPL	1992	Incumbent re-elected.	▌ ✓ Earl Pomeroy (Democratic-NPL) 52.9%; ▌John Dorso (Republican) 44.5%; ▌Jan Shelver (Independent) 1.7%; ▌Kenneth Loughead (Independent) 0.9%

== Ohio ==
District	Incumbent			Results	Candidates
District	Member	Party	First elected	Results	Candidates
Ohio 1	Steve Chabot	Republican	1994	Incumbent re-elected.	▌ ✓ Steve Chabot (Republican) 54%; ▌John Cranley (Democratic) 45%
Ohio 2	Rob Portman	Republican	1993	Incumbent re-elected.	▌ ✓ Rob Portman (Republican) 74%; ▌Charles W. Sanders (Democratic) 24%
Ohio 3	Tony P. Hall	Democratic	1978	Incumbent re-elected.	▌ ✓ Tony P. Hall (Democratic) 83%
Ohio 4	Mike Oxley	Republican	1981	Incumbent re-elected.	▌ ✓ Mike Oxley (Republican) 68%; ▌Daniel Dickman (Democratic) 30%
Ohio 5	Paul Gillmor	Republican	1988	Incumbent re-elected.	▌ ✓ Paul Gillmor (Republican) 70%; ▌Dannie Edmon (Democratic) 26%
Ohio 6	Ted Strickland	Democratic	1992; 1994 (defeated); 1996	Incumbent re-elected.	▌ ✓ Ted Strickland (Democratic) 58%; ▌Mike Azinger (Republican) 41%
Ohio 7	Dave Hobson	Republican	1990	Incumbent re-elected.	▌ ✓ Dave Hobson (Republican) 68%; ▌Donald Minor (Democratic) 25%
Ohio 8	John Boehner	Republican	1990	Incumbent re-elected.	▌ ✓ John Boehner (Republican) 71%; ▌John Parks (Democratic) 27%
Ohio 9	Marcy Kaptur	Democratic	1982	Incumbent re-elected.	▌ ✓ Marcy Kaptur (Democratic) 75%; ▌Dwight Bryan (Republican) 23%
Ohio 10	Dennis Kucinich	Democratic	1996	Incumbent re-elected.	▌ ✓ Dennis Kucinich (Democratic) 76%; ▌Bill Smith (Republican) 23%
Ohio 11	Stephanie Tubbs Jones	Democratic	1998	Incumbent re-elected.	▌ ✓ Stephanie Tubbs Jones (Democratic) 86%; ▌James Sykora (Republican) 12%
Ohio 12	John Kasich	Republican	1982	Incumbent retired. Republican hold.	▌ ✓ Pat Tiberi (Republican) 53%; ▌Maryellen O'Shaughnessy (Democratic) 44%
Ohio 13	Sherrod Brown	Democratic	1992	Incumbent re-elected.	▌ ✓ Sherrod Brown (Democratic) 65%; ▌Rick Jeric (Republican) 33%
Ohio 14	Thomas C. Sawyer	Democratic	1986	Incumbent re-elected.	▌ ✓ Thomas C. Sawyer (Democratic) 65%; ▌Rick Wood (Republican) 32%
Ohio 15	Deborah Pryce	Republican	1992	Incumbent re-elected.	▌ ✓ Deborah Pryce (Republican) 68%; ▌Bill Buckel (Democratic) 28%
Ohio 16	Ralph Regula	Republican	1972	Incumbent re-elected.	▌ ✓ Ralph Regula (Republican) 70%; ▌William Smith (Democratic) 27%
Ohio 17	James Traficant	Democratic	1984	Incumbent re-elected.	▌ ✓ James Traficant (Democratic) 50%; ▌Paul Alberty (Republican) 23%
Ohio 18	Bob Ney	Republican	1994	Incumbent re-elected.	▌ ✓ Bob Ney (Republican) 65%; ▌Marc Guthrie (Democratic) 34%
Ohio 19	Steve LaTourette	Republican	1994	Incumbent re-elected.	▌ ✓ Steve LaTourette (Republican) 70%; ▌Dale Virgil Blanchard (Democratic) 28%

== Oklahoma ==
District	Incumbent			Results	Candidates
District	Member	Party	First elected	Results	Candidates
Oklahoma 1	Steve Largent	Republican	1994	Incumbent re-elected.	▌ ✓ Steve Largent (Republican) 70%; ▌Dan Lowe (Democratic) 30%
Oklahoma 2	Tom Coburn	Republican	1994	Incumbent retired. Democratic gain.	▌ ✓ Brad Carson (Democratic) 55%; ▌Andy Ewing (Republican) 42%
Oklahoma 3	Wes Watkins	Republican	1976; 1990 (Retired); 1996	Incumbent re-elected.	▌ ✓ Wes Watkins (Republican) 87%
Oklahoma 4	J. C. Watts	Republican	1994	Incumbent re-elected.	▌ ✓ J. C. Watts (Republican) 65%; ▌Larry Weatherford (Democratic) 32%
Oklahoma 5	Ernest Istook	Republican	1992	Incumbent re-elected.	▌ ✓ Ernest Istook (Republican) 69%; ▌Garland McWatters (Democratic) 28%
Oklahoma 6	Frank Lucas	Republican	1994	Incumbent re-elected.	▌ ✓ Frank Lucas (Republican) 60%; ▌Randy Beutler (Democratic) 40%

== Oregon ==
District	Incumbent			Results	Candidates
District	Member	Party	First elected	Results	Candidates
Oregon 1	David Wu	Democratic	1998	Incumbent re-elected.	▌ ✓ David Wu (Democratic) 59%; ▌Charles Starr (Republican) 39%
Oregon 2	Greg Walden	Republican	1998	Incumbent re-elected.	▌ ✓ Greg Walden (Republican) 74%; ▌Walter Ponsford (Democratic) 26%
Oregon 3	Earl Blumenauer	Democratic	1996	Incumbent re-elected.	▌ ✓ Earl Blumenauer (Democratic) 68%; ▌Jeffery Pollock (Republican) 24%; ▌Tre Arrow (Green) 6%
Oregon 4	Peter DeFazio	Democratic	1986	Incumbent re-elected.	▌ ✓ Peter DeFazio (Democratic) 69%; ▌John Lindsey (Republican) 31%
Oregon 5	Darlene Hooley	Democratic	1996	Incumbent re-elected.	▌ ✓ Darlene Hooley (Democratic) 57%; ▌Brian Boquist (Republican) 43%

== Pennsylvania ==
District	Incumbent			Results	Candidates
District	Member	Party	First elected	Results	Candidates
Pennsylvania 1	Bob Brady	Democratic	1998	Incumbent re-elected.	▌ ✓ Bob Brady (Democratic) 88%; ▌Steven Kush (Republican) 12%
Pennsylvania 2	Chaka Fattah	Democratic	1994	Incumbent re-elected.	▌ ✓ Chaka Fattah (Democratic) 99%
Pennsylvania 3	Robert A. Borski Jr.	Democratic	1982	Incumbent re-elected.	▌ ✓ Robert A. Borski Jr. (Democratic) 69%; ▌Charles F. Dougherty (Republican) 31%
Pennsylvania 4	Ron Klink	Democratic	1992	Incumbent retired to run for U.S. Senator. Republican gain.	▌ ✓ Melissa Hart (Republican) 59%; ▌Terry Van Horne (Democratic) 41%
Pennsylvania 5	John E. Peterson	Republican	1996	Incumbent re-elected.	▌ ✓ John E. Peterson (Republican) 86%; ▌William M. Belitskus (Green) 8%
Pennsylvania 6	Tim Holden	Democratic	1992	Incumbent re-elected.	▌ ✓ Tim Holden (Democratic) 67%; ▌Thomas Kopel (Republican) 33%
Pennsylvania 7	Curt Weldon	Republican	1986	Incumbent re-elected.	▌ ✓ Curt Weldon (Republican) 65%; ▌Peter Lennon (Democratic) 35%
Pennsylvania 8	James C. Greenwood	Republican	1992	Incumbent re-elected.	▌ ✓ James C. Greenwood (Republican) 60%; ▌Ronald Strouse (Democratic) 39%
Pennsylvania 9	Bud Shuster	Republican	1972	Incumbent re-elected.	▌ ✓ Bud Shuster (Republican) Uncontested
Pennsylvania 10	Don Sherwood	Republican	1998	Incumbent re-elected.	▌ ✓ Don Sherwood (Republican) 53%; ▌Patrick Casey (Democratic) 47%
Pennsylvania 11	Paul Kanjorski	Democratic	1984	Incumbent re-elected.	▌ ✓ Paul Kanjorski (Democratic) 66%; ▌Stephen Urban (Republican) 34%
Pennsylvania 12	John Murtha	Democratic	1974	Incumbent re-elected.	▌ ✓ John Murtha (Democratic) 71%; ▌Bill Choby (Republican) 28%
Pennsylvania 13	Joe Hoeffel	Democratic	1998	Incumbent re-elected.	▌ ✓ Joe Hoeffel (Democratic) 53%; ▌Stewart Greenleaf (Republican) 46%
Pennsylvania 14	William J. Coyne	Democratic	1980	Incumbent re-elected.	▌ ✓ William J. Coyne (Democratic) Uncontested
Pennsylvania 15	Pat Toomey	Republican	1998	Incumbent re-elected.	▌ ✓ Pat Toomey (Republican) 53%; ▌Ed O'Brien (Democratic) 47%
Pennsylvania 16	Joe Pitts	Republican	1996	Incumbent re-elected.	▌ ✓ Joe Pitts (Republican) 67%; ▌Robert Yorczyk (Democratic) 33%
Pennsylvania 17	George Gekas	Republican	1982	Incumbent re-elected.	▌ ✓ George Gekas (Republican) 72%; ▌Leslye Hess Herrmann (Democratic) 28%
Pennsylvania 18	Mike Doyle	Democratic	1994	Incumbent re-elected.	▌ ✓ Mike Doyle (Democratic) 69%; ▌Craig Stephens (Republican) 31%
Pennsylvania 19	William F. Goodling	Republican	1974	Incumbent retired. Republican hold.	▌ ✓ Todd Russell Platts (Republican) 73%; ▌Jeff Sanders (Democratic) 27%
Pennsylvania 20	Frank Mascara	Democratic	1994	Incumbent re-elected.	▌ ✓ Frank Mascara (Democratic) 64%; ▌Ronald Davis (Republican) 36%
Pennsylvania 21	Phil English	Republican	1994	Incumbent re-elected.	▌ ✓ Phil English (Republican) 61%; ▌Marc Flitter (Democratic) 39%

== Rhode Island ==
District	Incumbent			Results	Candidates
District	Member	Party	First elected	Results	Candidates
Rhode Island 1	Patrick J. Kennedy	Democratic	1994	Incumbent re-elected.	▌ ✓ Patrick J. Kennedy (Democratic) 67%; ▌Steve Cabral (Republican) 33%
Rhode Island 2	Robert Weygand	Democratic	1996	Incumbent retired to run for U.S. Senator. Democratic hold.	▌ ✓ James Langevin (Democratic) 62%; ▌Rodney Driver (Independent) 21%; ▌Robert Tingle (Republican) 14%; ▌Dorman Hayes (Green) 2%

== South Carolina ==
District	Incumbent			Results	Candidates
District	Member	Party	First elected	Results	Candidates
South Carolina 1	Mark Sanford	Republican	1994	Incumbent retired. Republican hold.	▌ ✓ Henry E. Brown Jr. (Republican) 60%; ▌Andy Brack (Democratic) 36%
South Carolina 2	Floyd Spence	Republican	1970	Incumbent re-elected.	▌ ✓ Floyd Spence (Republican) 58%; ▌Jane Frederick (Democratic) 41%
South Carolina 3	Lindsey Graham	Republican	1994	Incumbent re-elected.	▌ ✓ Lindsey Graham (Republican) 68%; ▌George Brightharp (Democratic) 31%
South Carolina 4	Jim DeMint	Republican	1998	Incumbent re-elected.	▌ ✓ Jim DeMint (Republican) 80%
South Carolina 5	John Spratt	Democratic	1982	Incumbent re-elected.	▌ ✓ John Spratt (Democratic) 59%; ▌Carl Gullick (Republican) 40%
South Carolina 6	Jim Clyburn	Democratic	1992	Incumbent re-elected.	▌ ✓ Jim Clyburn (Democratic) 73%; ▌Vince Ellison (Republican) 26%

== South Dakota ==
District	Incumbent			Results	Candidates
District	Member	Party	First elected	Results	Candidates
South Dakota at-large	John Thune	Republican	1996	Incumbent re-elected.	▌ ✓ John Thune (Republican) 74%; ▌Curt Hohn (Democratic) 25%

== Tennessee ==
District	Incumbent			Results	Candidates
District	Member	Party	First elected	Results	Candidates
Tennessee 1	Bill Jenkins	Republican	1996	Incumbent re-elected.	▌ ✓ Bill Jenkins (Republican) Uncontested
Tennessee 2	Jimmy Duncan	Republican	1988	Incumbent re-elected.	▌ ✓ Jimmy Duncan (Republican) 90%
Tennessee 3	Zach Wamp	Republican	1994	Incumbent re-elected.	▌ ✓ Zach Wamp (Republican) 64%; ▌William Callaway (Democratic) 35%
Tennessee 4	Van Hilleary	Republican	1994	Incumbent re-elected.	▌ ✓ Van Hilleary (Republican) 66%; ▌David Dunaway (Democratic) 34%
Tennessee 5	Bob Clement	Democratic	1988	Incumbent re-elected.	▌ ✓ Bob Clement (Democratic) 73%; ▌Stan Scott (Republican) 25%
Tennessee 6	Bart Gordon	Democratic	1984	Incumbent re-elected.	▌ ✓ Bart Gordon (Democratic) 63%; ▌David Charles (Republican) 37%
Tennessee 7	Ed Bryant	Republican	1994	Incumbent re-elected.	▌ ✓ Ed Bryant (Republican) 70%; ▌Richard Sims (Democratic) 30%
Tennessee 8	John S. Tanner	Democratic	1988	Incumbent re-elected.	▌ ✓ John S. Tanner (Democratic) 72%; ▌Bill Yancy (Democratic) 28%
Tennessee 9	Harold Ford Jr.	Democratic	1996	Incumbent re-elected.	▌ ✓ Harold Ford Jr. (Democratic) Uncontested

== Texas ==
District	Incumbent			Results	Candidates
District	Member	Party	First elected	Results	Candidates
Texas 1	Max Sandlin	Democratic	1996	Incumbent re-elected.	▌ ✓ Max Sandlin (Democratic) 56%; ▌Noble Willingham (Republican) 44%
Texas 2	Jim Turner	Democratic	1996	Incumbent re-elected.	✓ Jim Turner (Democratic) 92%
Texas 3	Sam Johnson	Republican	1991	Incumbent re-elected.	▌ ✓ Sam Johnson (Republican) 72%; ▌Billy Wayne Zachary (Democratic) 26%
Texas 4	Ralph Hall	Democratic	1980	Incumbent re-elected.	▌ ✓ Ralph Hall (Democratic) 61%; ▌Jon Newton (Republican) 38%
Texas 5	Pete Sessions	Republican	1996	Incumbent re-elected.	▌ ✓ Pete Sessions (Republican) 55%; ▌Regina Montoya Coggins (Democratic) 45%
Texas 6	Joe Barton	Republican	1984	Incumbent re-elected.	▌ ✓ Joe Barton (Republican) 89%
Texas 7	Bill Archer	Republican	1970	Incumbent retired. Republican hold.	▌ ✓ John Culberson (Republican) 74%; ▌Jeff Sell (Democratic) 25%
Texas 8	Kevin Brady	Republican	1996	Incumbent re-elected.	▌ ✓ Kevin Brady (Republican) 92%
Texas 9	Nick Lampson	Democratic	1996	Incumbent re-elected.	▌ ✓ Nick Lampson (Democratic) 60%; ▌Paul Williams (Republican) 40%
Texas 10	Lloyd Doggett	Democratic	1994	Incumbent re-elected.	▌ ✓ Lloyd Doggett (Democratic) 85%
Texas 11	Chet Edwards	Democratic	1990	Incumbent re-elected.	▌ ✓ Chet Edwards (Democratic) 55%; ▌Ramsey Farley (Republican) 45%
Texas 12	Kay Granger	Republican	1996	Incumbent re-elected.	▌ ✓ Kay Granger (Republican) 63%; ▌Mark Greene (Democratic) 36%
Texas 13	Mac Thornberry	Republican	1994	Incumbent re-elected.	▌ ✓ Mac Thornberry (Republican) 68%; ▌Curtis Clinesmith (Democratic) 32%
Texas 14	Ron Paul	Republican	1976 (special); 1976 (defeated); 1978; 1984 (retired); 1996	Incumbent re-elected.	▌ ✓ Ron Paul (Republican) 60%; ▌Loy Sneary (Democratic) 40%
Texas 15	Rubén Hinojosa	Democratic	1996	Incumbent re-elected.	▌ ✓ Rubén Hinojosa (Democratic) 89%; ▌Frank L. Jones III (Independent) 11%
Texas 16	Silvestre Reyes	Democratic	1996	Incumbent re-elected.	▌ ✓ Silvestre Reyes (Democratic) 69%; ▌Daniel Power (Republican) 31%
Texas 17	Charles Stenholm	Democratic	1978	Incumbent re-elected.	▌ ✓ Charles Stenholm (Democratic) 60%; ▌Darrell Clements (Republican) 36%
Texas 18	Sheila Jackson Lee	Democratic	1994	Incumbent re-elected.	▌ ✓ Sheila Jackson Lee (Democratic) 77%; ▌Bob Levy (Republican) 23%
Texas 19	Larry Combest	Republican	1984	Incumbent re-elected.	▌ ✓ Larry Combest (Republican) 92%
Texas 20	Charlie González	Democratic	1998	Incumbent re-elected.	▌ ✓ Charlie González (Democratic) 88%; ▌Alejandro (Alex) DePeña (Independent) 12%
Texas 21	Lamar Smith	Republican	1986	Incumbent re-elected.	▌ ✓ Lamar Smith (Republican) 61%; ▌Joann Matranga (Democratic) 37%
Texas 22	Tom DeLay	Republican	1984	Incumbent re-elected.	▌ ✓ Tom DeLay (Republican) 66%; ▌Hill Kemp (Democratic) 34%
Texas 23	Henry Bonilla	Republican	1992	Incumbent re-elected.	▌ ✓ Henry Bonilla (Republican) 60%; ▌Isidro Garza (Democratic) 39%
Texas 24	Martin Frost	Democratic	1978	Incumbent re-elected.	▌ ✓ Martin Frost (Democratic) 62%; ▌Bryndan Wright (Republican) 37%
Texas 25	Ken Bentsen Jr.	Democratic	1994	Incumbent re-elected.	▌ ✓ Ken Bentsen Jr. (Democratic) 60%; ▌Phil Sudan (Republican) 39%
Texas 26	Dick Armey	Republican	1984	Incumbent re-elected.	▌ ✓ Dick Armey (Republican) 73%; ▌Steve Love (Democratic) 26%
Texas 27	Solomon P. Ortiz	Democratic	1982	Incumbent re-elected.	▌ ✓ Solomon P. Ortiz (Democratic) 64%; ▌Pat Ahumada (Republican) 34%
Texas 28	Ciro Rodriguez	Democratic	1997	Incumbent re-elected.	▌ ✓ Ciro Rodriguez (Democratic) 89%; ▌William Stallknecht (Independent) 11%
Texas 29	Gene Green	Democratic	1992	Incumbent re-elected.	▌ ✓ Gene Green (Democratic) 74%; ▌Joe Vu (Republican) 26%
Texas 30	Eddie Bernice Johnson	Democratic	1992	Incumbent re-elected.	▌ ✓ Eddie Bernice Johnson (Democratic) 92%

== Utah ==
District	Incumbent			Results	Candidates
District	Member	Party	First elected	Results	Candidates
Utah 1	James V. Hansen	Republican	1980	Incumbent re-elected.	▌ ✓ James V. Hansen (Republican) 69%; ▌Kathleen McConkie Collinwood (Democratic) 27.2%; ▌Hartley D. Anderson (Independent American) 1.9%; ▌Dave Starr Seely (Libertarian) 1.2%; ▌Matthew D. Frandsen (Natural Law) 0.7%
Utah 2	Merrill Cook	Republican	1996	Incumbent lost renomination. Democratic gain.	▌ ✓ Jim Matheson (Democratic) 55.9%; ▌Derek Smith (Republican) 41.3%; ▌Bruce Bangerter (Independent American) 1.8%; Others: ▌Peter Pixton (Libertarian) 0.8%; ▌Steven Alberts Voris (Independent) 0.2%
Utah 3	Chris Cannon	Republican	1996	Incumbent re-elected.	▌ ✓ Chris Cannon (Republican) 58.5%; ▌Donald Dunn (Democratic) 37.3%; ▌Michael J. Lehman (Independent American) 2.3%; ▌Kitty K. Burton (Libertarian) 1.5%; ▌Randall Tolpinrud (Natural Law) 0.4%

== Vermont ==
District	Incumbent			Results	Candidates
District	Member	Party	First elected	Results	Candidates
Vermont at-large	Bernie Sanders	Independent	1990	Incumbent re-elected.	▌ ✓ Bernie Sanders (Independent) 69.2%; ▌Karen Ann Kerin (Republican) 18.3%; ▌Peter Diamondstone (Democratic-Liberty Union) 5.3%; ▌Stewart Skrill (Independent) 4.2%; ▌Jack Rogers (Vermont Grassroots) 1.7%; ▌Daniel H. Krymkowski (Libertarian) 1%

== Virginia ==
District	Incumbent			Results	Candidates
District	Member	Party	First elected	Results	Candidates
Virginia 1	Vacant			Rep. Herbert H. Bateman (R) died September 11, 2000. Republican hold.	▌ ✓ Jo Ann Davis (Republican) 57.6%; ▌Lawrence Davies (Democratic) 37.0%; ▌Sharon A. Wood (Independent) 3.7%; ▌Josh Billings (Independent) 1.5%
Virginia 2	Owen B. Pickett	Democratic	1986	Incumbent retired. Republican gain.	▌ ✓ Ed Schrock (Republican) 52%; ▌Jody Wagner (Democratic) 48%
Virginia 3	Bobby Scott	Democratic	1992	Incumbent re-elected.	▌ ✓ Bobby Scott (Democratic) Uncontested
Virginia 4	Norman Sisisky	Democratic	1982	Incumbent re-elected.	▌ ✓ Norman Sisisky (Democratic) Uncontested
Virginia 5	Virgil Goode	Independent	1996 (Note: Goode was first elected as a Democrat. He left the party in January 2000.)	Incumbent re-elected.	▌ ✓ Virgil Goode (Independent) 68%; ▌John Boyd (Democratic) 31%
Virginia 6	Bob Goodlatte	Republican	1992	Incumbent re-elected.	▌ ✓ Bob Goodlatte (Republican) Uncontested
Virginia 7	Thomas J. Bliley Jr.	Republican	1980	Incumbent retired. Republican hold.	▌ ✓ Eric Cantor (Republican) 67%; ▌Warren Stewart (Democratic) 33%
Virginia 8	Jim Moran	Democratic	1990	Incumbent re-elected.	▌ ✓ Jim Moran (Democratic) 64%; ▌Demaris H. Miller (Republican) 35%
Virginia 9	Rick Boucher	Democratic	1982	Incumbent re-elected.	▌ ✓ Rick Boucher (Democratic) 70%; ▌Michael Osborne (Republican) 30%
Virginia 10	Frank Wolf	Republican	1980	Incumbent re-elected.	▌ ✓ Frank Wolf (Republican) 85%
Virginia 11	Tom Davis	Republican	1994	Incumbent re-elected.	▌ ✓ Tom Davis (Republican) 63%; ▌Mike Corrigan (Democratic) 35%

== Washington ==
District	Incumbent			Results	Candidates
District	Member	Party	First elected	Results	Candidates
Washington 1	Jay Inslee	Democratic	1992; 1994 (defeated); 1998	Incumbent re-elected.	▌ ✓ Jay Inslee (Democratic) 54.6%; ▌Dan McDonald (Republican) 42.6%; ▌Bruce Newman (Libertarian) 2.8%
Washington 2	Jack Metcalf	Republican	1994	Incumbent retired. Democratic gain.	▌ ✓ Rick Larsen (Democratic) 50%; ▌John Koster (Republican) 45.9%; ▌Stuart Andrews (Libertarian) 2.6%; ▌Glen S. Johnson (Natural Law) 1.5%
Washington 3	Brian Baird	Democratic	1998	Incumbent re-elected.	▌ ✓ Brian Baird (Democratic) 56.4%; ▌Trent Matson (Republican) 40.6%; ▌Erne Lewis (Libertarian) 3%
Washington 4	Doc Hastings	Republican	1994	Incumbent re-elected.	▌ ✓ Doc Hastings (Republican) 60.9%; ▌Jim Davis (Democratic) 37.3%; ▌Fred D. Krauss (Libertarian) 1.8%
Washington 5	George Nethercutt	Republican	1994	Incumbent re-elected.	▌ ✓ George Nethercutt (Republican) 57.3%; ▌Tom Keefe (Democratic) 38.9%; ▌Greg Holmes (Libertarian) 3.8%
Washington 6	Norm Dicks	Democratic	1976	Incumbent re-elected.	▌ ✓ Norm Dicks (Democratic) 64.7%; ▌Bob Lawrence (Republican) 31.1%; ▌John Bennett (Libertarian) 4.2%
Washington 7	Jim McDermott	Democratic	1988	Incumbent re-elected.	▌ ✓ Jim McDermott (Democratic) 72.8%; ▌Joe Szwaja (Green) 19.6%; ▌Joel Grus (Libertarian) 7.6%
Washington 8	Jennifer Dunn	Republican	1992	Incumbent re-elected.	▌ ✓ Jennifer Dunn (Republican) 62.2%; ▌Heidi Behrens-Benedict (Democratic) 35.7%; ▌Bernard McIlroy (Libertarian) 2.1%
Washington 9	Adam Smith	Democratic	1996	Incumbent re-elected.	▌ ✓ Adam Smith (Democratic) 61.7%; ▌Chris Vance (Republican) 34.9%; ▌Bernard McIlroy (Libertarian) 3.4%

== West Virginia ==
District	Incumbent			Results	Candidates
District	Member	Party	First elected	Results	Candidates
West Virginia 1	Alan Mollohan	Democratic	1982	Incumbent re-elected.	▌ ✓ Alan Mollohan (Democratic) 87.8%; ▌Richard Kerr (Libertarian) 12.2%
West Virginia 2	Bob Wise	Democratic	1982	Incumbent retired to run for Governor of West Virginia. Republican gain.	▌ ✓ Shelley Moore Capito (Republican) 48.5%; ▌Jim Humphreys (Democratic) 45.9%; ▌John Brown (Libertarian) 5.6%
West Virginia 3	Nick Rahall	Democratic	1976	Incumbent re-elected.	▌ ✓ Nick Rahall (Democratic) 91.3%; ▌Jeff Robinson (Libertarian) 8.7%

== Wisconsin ==
District	Incumbent			Results	Candidates
District	Member	Party	First elected	Results	Candidates
Wisconsin 1	Paul Ryan	Republican	1998	Incumbent re-elected.	▌ ✓ Paul Ryan (Republican) 66%; ▌Jeffrey Thomas (Democratic) 34%
Wisconsin 2	Tammy Baldwin	Democratic	1998	Incumbent re-elected.	▌ ✓ Tammy Baldwin (Democratic) 51%; ▌John Sharpless (Republican) 49%
Wisconsin 3	Ron Kind	Democratic	1996	Incumbent re-elected.	▌ ✓ Ron Kind (Democratic) 64%; ▌Susan Tully (Republican) 36%
Wisconsin 4	Jerry Kleczka	Democratic	1984	Incumbent re-elected.	▌ ✓ Jerry Kleczka (Democratic) 60.8%; ▌Tim Riener (Republican) 37.8%; ▌Nikola Rajnovic (Libertarian) 1.4%
Wisconsin 5	Tom Barrett	Democratic	1992	Incumbent re-elected.	▌ ✓ Tom Barrett (Democratic) 78%; ▌Jonathan Smith (Republican) 22%
Wisconsin 6	Tom Petri	Republican	1979 (Special)	Incumbent re-elected.	▌ ✓ Tom Petri (Republican) 65%; ▌Dan Flaherty (Democratic) 35%
Wisconsin 7	Dave Obey	Democratic	1969 (Special)	Incumbent re-elected.	▌ ✓ Dave Obey (Democratic) 63%; ▌Sean Cronin (Republican) 37%
Wisconsin 8	Mark Andrew Green	Republican	1998	Incumbent re-elected.	▌ ✓ Mark Andrew Green (Republican) 75%; ▌Dean Reich (Democratic) 25%
Wisconsin 9	Jim Sensenbrenner	Republican	1978	Incumbent re-elected.	▌ ✓ Jim Sensenbrenner (Republican) 74%; ▌Mike Clawson (Democratic) 26%

== Wyoming ==
District	Incumbent			Results	Candidates
District	Member	Party	First elected	Results	Candidates
Wyoming at-large	Barbara Cubin	Republican	1994	Incumbent re-elected.	▌ ✓ Barbara Cubin (Republican) 66.8%; ▌Michael Allen Green (Democratic) 28.6%; ▌Lewis Stock (Libertarian) 3%; ▌Victor Raymond (Natural Law) 1.6%

== See also ==
- 2000 United States elections
  - 2000 United States gubernatorial elections
  - 2000 United States presidential election
  - 2000 United States Senate elections
- 106th United States Congress
- 107th United States Congress
