= John T. Myers (politician) =

American politician (1927–2015)

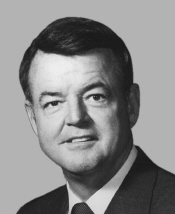

Member of the U.S. House of Representatives from Indiana's 7th district
- In office January 3, 1967 – January 3, 1997
- Preceded by: William G. Bray
- Succeeded by: Edward A. Pease

Personal details
- Born: John Thomas Myers; February 8, 1927 Covington, Indiana, U.S.
- Died: January 27, 2015 (aged 87) Covington, Indiana, U.S.
- Party: Republican
- Spouse: Carol Myers
- Children: 2
- Education: Indiana State University

John Thomas Myers (February 8, 1927 – January 27, 2015) was an American military veteran and politician who served 15 terms as a Republican congressman from Indiana's 7th congressional district in the United States House of Representatives from 1967 to 1997.

== Life and education ==
Born in Covington, Indiana, Myers graduated from Covington High School in 1945 and earned his B.S. at Indiana State University in 1951. He also attended Eastern Illinois University where he was a member of the Sigma Pi fraternity.

=== Military service ===
Myers served in the United States Army from 1945 to 1946.

== Career ==
He was a cashier and trust officer with the Fountain Trust Company from 1952 to 1966 and worked as a farmer in Fountain County.

=== Congress ===
He was first elected to Congress in 1966 and was re-elected fourteen more times, serving from 1967 until his retirement in 1997. Although he was the ranking Republican on the United States House Committee on Appropriations, after the Republicans took control of the House in 1994, Myers was passed over for the position by new House Speaker Newt Gingrich, giving the post to Bob Livingston.

== Later life and legacy ==
Myers was married and had two daughters and five grandchildren. His son-in-law, Brian Kerns, represented the same district from 2001 to 2003.

Myers died at his home in Covington, Indiana on January 27, 2015, at the age of 87.

=== Legacy ===
A pedestrian bridge connecting nearby cities Lafayette and West Lafayette in Tippecanoe County is named after Myers and opened in 1993.

A technology center is named for Myers at Indiana State University in Terre Haute, Indiana.

A lock and dam on the Ohio River are named for Myers.

U.S. House of Representatives
Preceded by William G. Bray	Member of the U.S. House of Representatives from Indiana's 7th congressional district January 3, 1967 – January 3, 1997	Succeeded by Edward A. Pease
