= Brian Kerns =

American journalist (born 1957)

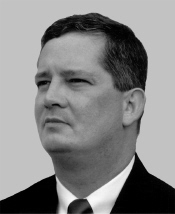

Member of the U.S. House of Representatives from Indiana's 7th district
- In office January 3, 2001 – January 3, 2003
- Preceded by: Edward A. Pease
- Succeeded by: Steve Buyer (redistricted)

Personal details
- Born: Brian Douglas Kerns; May 22, 1957 (age 69) Terre Haute, Indiana, U.S.
- Party: Republican
- Spouse: Lori Kerns
- Education: Indiana State University (BA, MPA)

Brian Douglas Kerns (born May 22, 1957) is an American journalist and politician. He served as a Republican representative from Indiana's 7th congressional district from January 3, 2001, to January 3, 2003.

Kerns was born in Terre Haute, Indiana. He has both a B.A. and an M.P.A. from Indiana State University. He is the son-in-law of Representative John T. Myers. He is married and has five children.

== Early career ==
Prior to serving in Congress, Kerns was an administrator at St. Joseph's College, and a television journalist. Kerns also was an aide to Representative Edward A. Pease and served as his chief of staff.

== Congressional career ==
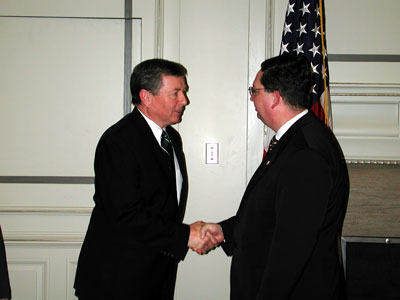
Kerns meets with Attorney General John Ashcroft in 2001

In 2000, when Pease retired, Kerns won a 12-way Republican primary. Kerns went on to win the general election with close to 65% of the vote.

During his term in Congress, Kerns took up many social issues including gun rights and working to ban human cloning. He is also responsible for bringing closure to the Lafayette Railroad Relocation Project. Kerns served on the International Relations and Transportation and Infrastructure committees. During his time in congress, Kerns never missed a single vote.

=== Reelection campaign ===
After the 2000 United States census, Kerns' district, which stretched from Terre Haute to West Lafayette, Indiana, was eliminated. Most of Kerns' old territory was placed in the newly created 4th district. That district had previously been the 5th, represented by fellow Republican Steve Buyer. However, Kerns' home in Terre Haute was placed in the Evansville-based 8th district of another Republican, John Hostettler. Rather than challenge Hostettler for the Republican nomination in the 8th, Kerns moved to Hendricks County to face Buyer, and lost 55% to 30% in a multi-candidate field.

U.S. House of Representatives
Preceded by Edward A. Pease	Member of the U.S. House of Representatives from Indiana's 7th congressional district 2001–2003	Succeeded by Julia Carson
U.S. order of precedence (ceremonial)
Preceded by Joseph Cao as Former U.S. Representative	Order of precedence of the United States as Former U.S. Representative	Succeeded by Mike Sodrel as Former U.S. Representative
