= Ed Pease =

American politician

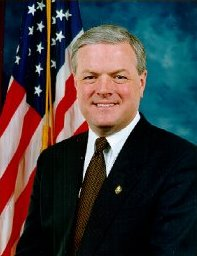

Member of the U.S. House of Representatives from Indiana's 7th district
- In office January 3, 1997 – January 3, 2001
- Preceded by: John Myers
- Succeeded by: Brian D. Kerns

Member of the Indiana Senate from the 37th district
- In office November 3, 1982 – November 4, 1992
- Preceded by: Lillian Cox Parent
- Succeeded by: Richard Bray

Member of the Indiana Senate from the 39th district
- In office November 5, 1980 – November 3, 1982
- Preceded by: Elden Creasy Tipton
- Succeeded by: James Russell Monk

Personal details
- Born: Edward Allan Pease; May 22, 1951 (age 75) Terre Haute, Indiana, U.S.
- Party: Republican
- Education: Indiana University, Bloomington (BA); Indiana University, Indianapolis (JD)

Edward Allan Pease (born May 22, 1951) is an American politician and lawyer from Indiana. He is a former Republican member of the United States House of Representatives, serving two terms from 1997 to 2001,

== Biography ==
=== Early life and education ===
Pease was born in Terre Haute, Indiana on May 22, 1951. He graduated from Gerstmeyer High School in Terre Haute, Indiana in 1969. He earned a Bachelor of Arts from Indiana University Bloomington in 1973 and a Juris Doctor from IUPUI in 1977. From 1978 to 1984 he pursued post-graduate studies at Indiana State University.

=== Legal, political, and community activities ===
He is an Eagle Scout and has been honored as an adult with the Distinguished Eagle Scout Award, the Silver Buffalo Award, the Silver Antelope Award, and the Silver Beaver Award; he is also a former chairman of the National Order of the Arrow Committee, in which post he was succeeded by Bradley Haddock. He was also selected as the 2015 BSA National Alumnus of the Year Award.

From 1965 to 1975 he served on the staff and later became director of the Wabash Valley Council of the Boy Scouts of America in Terre Haute. From 1974 to 1975 he served as a law clerk to the Attorney General of Indiana. From 1975 to 1976 he served as the national director of alumni affairs for the Pi Kappa Alpha fraternity in Memphis, Tennessee. From 1977 to 1984 he practiced law in Brazil, Indiana and served as an attorney for the Clay County Department of Public Welfare. In 1980 he served as City Attorney for Brazil, Indiana. From 1984 to 1993 he served as an assistant to the president of the Indiana State University and later general counsel of the university. From 1993 to 1997 he served as vice president for university advancement at Indiana State University. From 1980 to 1992 he served as a member of the Indiana Senate.

=== Congress ===
His tenure in Congress was defined by significant accomplishments such as increasing Indiana's share of transportation funding, increasing the investment in the US military, saving the historic downtown Federal Building in Terre Haute, Indiana, and serving on the House Judiciary Committee that introduced the articles of impeachment for President Bill Clinton.

His time in Congress was marred by several unfortunate circumstances, including finding a dead body outside his apartment building, being mugged at an Arlington, Virginia subway station, and having his apartment burglarized. His successor, Brian Kerns, who served as Pease's chief of staff during his time in Congress, speculated that these incidents may have contributed to Pease's decision to retire from office.

=== Later career ===
After leaving Congress, Pease became senior vice president of government relations for Rolls-Royce plc North America, later becoming a consultant for the company.

Pease has been an active supporter of the American college fraternity movement, serving as national president of his fraternity, Pi Kappa Alpha, receiving the fraternity's Loyalty Award at the 2016 Convention, and as a two-term president of the North American Interfraternity Conference and winner of its highest honor, the Gold Medal.

In 2018, he was named chairman of the board of trustees at Indiana State University.

=== Pi Kappa Alpha ===
Edward A. Pease (Indiana, Delta Xi ’71) has served Pi Kappa Alpha as Foundation president, international president (1988–90), Supreme Council vice president, Midwest regional president, and founding chapter advisor to Theta Omicron chapter (Indiana State). As chapter advisor for the Indiana State Pikes Ed Instilled morales and integrity into these young men. In 1979 Ed brought the Theta Omicron Pike Chapter to Indiana State's campus as the first and only dry fraternity house at ISU. Since then this chapter has gone on to dominate on Indiana State's campus, Winning the Intramural Cup every year since its founding as well as being awarded the most Smythe trophies in Pi Kappa Alpha History (awarded to top 10% of Pike Chapters).

U.S. House of Representatives
Preceded by John Myers	Member of the U.S. House of Representatives from Indiana's 7th congressional district 1997–2001	Succeeded by Brian D. Kerns
U.S. order of precedence (ceremonial)
Preceded by Anthony Gonzalez as Former U.S. Representative	Order of precedence of the United States as Former U.S. Representative	Succeeded by Chris Chocola as Former U.S. Representative
