= Joey Grist =

American politician from Mississippi

Joe T. Grist Jr. is a former state legislator in Mississippi. A member of the Democratic Party, Grist served in the Mississippi House of Representatives. He is an elder at the Lee Acres Church of Christ. He is a Democrat.
