= 1994 United States House of Representatives elections in Idaho =

- November 8, 1994

All 2 Idaho seats to the United States House of Representatives
| | Majority party | Minority party |
|---|---|---|
| Party | Republican | Democratic |
| Last election | 1 | 1 |
| Seats won | 2 | 0 |
| Seat change | ▲1 | ▼1 |
| Popular vote | 255,321 | 137,762 |
| Percentage | 64.95% | 35.05% |

The 1994 United States House of Representatives elections in Idaho were held on November 8, 1994, to elect the state of Idaho's two members to the United States House of Representatives. Incumbent Democratic Congressman Larry LaRocco was defeated for re-election by Republican Helen Chenoweth, and Republican Congressman Mike Crapo won re-election to a second term.

== Overview ==
1994 United States House of Representatives elections in Idaho
| Party | Votes | Percentage | Seats | +/– |
|---|---|---|---|---|
| Republican | 255,321 | 64.95% | 2 | ▲1 |
| Democratic | 137,762 | 35.05% | 0 | ▼1 |
| Totals | 393,083 | 100.00% | 2 | — |

== District 1 ==
Democratic Congressman Larry LaRocco ran for re-election to a third term. He was challenged in the general election by Helen Chenoweth, the former executive director of the Idaho Republican Party. Chenoweath defeated LaRocco by a wide margin, winning 55 percent of the vote to his 45 percent.

=== Republican primary ===
==== Candidates ====
- Helen Chenoweth, former executive director of the Idaho Republican Party
- David H. Leroy, former Lieutenant Governor of Idaho
- Ron McMurray, former manager of the Port of Lewiston
- Sonny Kinsey, veteran, law student

==== Results ====
Republican primary results
| Party | Candidate | Votes | % |
|---|---|---|---|
| Republican | Helen Chenoweth | 28,545 | 47.94% |
| Republican | David H. Leroy | 16,570 | 27.83% |
| Republican | Ron McMurray | 11,816 | 19.85% |
| Republican | Sonny Kinsey | 2,606 | 4.38% |
| Total votes | | 59,537 | 100.00% |

=== Democratic primary ===
==== Candidates ====
- Larry LaRocco, incumbent U.S. Representative

==== Results ====
Democratic primary results
| Party | Candidate | Votes | % |
|---|---|---|---|
| Democratic | Larry LaRocco (inc.) | 23,829 | 100.00% |
| Total votes | | 23,829 | 100.00% |

=== General election ===
==== Candidates ====
- Helen Chenoweth (Republican)
- Larry LaRocco (Democratic)

==== Results ====
1994 Idaho's 1st congressional district general election results
| Party | Candidate | Votes | % |
|---|---|---|---|
| Republican | Helen Chenoweth | 111,728 | 55.43% |
| Democratic | Larry LaRocco (inc.) | 89,826 | 44.57% |
| Total votes | | 201,554 | 100.00% |
| Republican gain from Democratic | | | |

== District 2 ==
Incumbent Republican Congressman Mike Crapo ran for re-election to a second term. He was challenged by Democratic nominee Penny Fletcher, a customer service representative, and won re-election in a landslide, receiving 75 percent of the vote.

=== Republican primary ===
==== Candidates ====
- Mike Crapo, incumbent U.S. Representative

==== Results ====
Republican primary results
| Party | Candidate | Votes | % |
|---|---|---|---|
| Republican | Mike Crapo (inc.) | 51,568 | 100.00% |
| Total votes | | 51,568 | 100.00% |

=== Democratic primary ===
==== Candidates ====
- Penny Fletcher, US West customer service representative

==== Results ====
Democratic primary results
| Party | Candidate | Votes | % |
|---|---|---|---|
| Democratic | Penny Fletcher | 18,814 | 100.00% |
| Total votes | | 18,814 | 100.00% |

=== General election ===
==== Candidates ====
- Mike Crapo (Republican)
- Penny Fletcher (Democratic)

==== Results ====
1994 Idaho's 2nd congressional district general election results
| Party | Candidate | Votes | % |
|---|---|---|---|
| Republican | Mike Crapo (inc.) | 143,593 | 74.97% |
| Democratic | Penny Fletcher | 47,936 | 25.03% |
| Total votes | | 191,529 | 100.00% |
| Republican hold | | | |

== See also ==
- 1994 United States House of Representatives elections
