= Leonard Steinhorn =

American writer

Leonard Steinhorn is an author, CBS News political analyst, and professor of communication and affiliate professor of history at American University. He teaches, writes and lectures on American politics and presidential elections; the 1960s in America; baby boomers; recent American history; and race relations in the United States.

== Career ==
Steinhorn is a Phi Beta Kappa graduate of Vassar College, where he received a bachelor's degree in history. He later received his master's degree in history from Johns Hopkins University.

For several years in the 1980s, he worked as a speechwriter, press secretary, and policy advisor for members of the United States Congress, including former House Judiciary Committee Chair Peter W. Rodino and the future House Majority Leader, Congressman Steny Hoyer. He has served as a senior executive at strategic communication and media firms as well as leading non-profit organizations, including People for the American Way.

In 1995, Steinhorn began teaching at American University in Washington, D.C. He was voted American University Faculty Member of the Year in 1999 and 2001 and he also was named Honors Professor of the Year in 2010. His courses on politics, presidential elections and recent American history have been featured on CNN, C-SPAN, NBC, FOX, USA Today, Agence France-Presse, and The Chronicle of Higher Education. From 2002 to 2004, he was president of American University's chapter of Phi Beta Kappa.

Since 2012 he has served as a political analyst for CBS News Radio, covering politics and elections, and he appears regularly on WUSA9 TV News in Washington, DC. Before that he was a political analyst for FOX-5 News in Washington, DC. He also has appeared in numerous broadcast outlets including C-SPAN, CNN, CBS News, NBC News, BBC, Al Jazeera, ARD (Germany), AFP (France), CGTN (China), and NPR. Steinhorn has appeared as an on-air expert in a number of documentaries, including CNN’s The Sixties and 1968: The Year That Changed America; Superheroes Decoded on the History Channel; and The Kennedy Files on REELZ. He also appeared in a DVD special feature on the Baby Boom generation for the final season of AMC’s Mad Men.

Since 2014 Steinhorn has lectured around the country for One Day University, giving talks on American politics, history, and the 1960s. He also has given speeches at the Clinton Library in Little Rock, The National Press Club, The Economic Club of Florida, Andrews Air Force Base, Amherst College, and Charles University in Prague, among others.

In 2010, Steinhorn founded the website PunditWire with Robert Lehrman, an adjunct professor in American University's School of Communication and former speechwriter for Al Gore. PunditWire, which ceased publication in 2017, was a news commentary site whose contributors are all current or former speechwriters from across the political spectrum.

== Writing ==
Steinhorn wrote The Greater Generation: In Defense of the Baby Boom Legacy (2006) and co-authored By the Color of Our Skin: The Illusion of Integration and the Reality of Race (1999).

He has been published in The Washington Post, New York Times, Los Angeles Times, Politico, The Hill, Political Wire, International Herald Tribune, Baltimore Sun, Atlanta Journal-Constitution, Chicago Sun-Times, Seattle Times, Huffington Post, History News Network, Salon, BillMoyers.com, World Financial Review, among others.

=== Critical reception ===
Publishers Weekly called The Greater Generation a "powerful book" and wrote that "Steinhorn forcefully and gracefully defends his age cohort against these stereotypes in a paean to the generation that forever altered the face of American culture." Kirkus said it was "a sturdy, often convincing defense of his own Boomer generation." Salon.com wrote that Steinhorn's "unapologetic celebration of the boomer legacy is refreshing, and much of his argument is convincing," but criticized it for sentimentalizing boomers.

The New York Times called By the Color of Our Skin a “clear-headed, energetic and pointedly sarcastic book about this country's racial divisions and cultural hypocrisy."
