= Ben Saunders (professor) =

British-born academic

- Born: 16 November 1968 (age 57); Cardiff, Wales
- Education: PhD in English Literature, Masters in Philosophy in English Renaissance Literature, Bachelor of Arts
- Alma mater: Duke University, University of Cambridge, University of East Anglia
- Occupations: Program Director of the Comics and Cartoons Studies Minor, Professor of English at the University of Oregon
- Writing career
- Notable awards: Inkpot Award (2023)

Ben Saunders is a British-born academic and founder of the world's first Undergraduate Minor in Comics and Cartoon Studies at the University of Oregon in Eugene, Oregon. He holds a PhD in English Literature from Duke University, a Masters in Philosophy in English Renaissance Literature from University of Cambridge and a Bachelor of the Arts degree with First Class Honors from the University of East Anglia.

== Career ==
In addition to teaching courses in Comics and Cartoon Studies at the University of Oregon, Saunders also teaches courses on the poetry and drama of the English Renaissance and the history of British and American comics and cartoons. Saunders is the author of Desiring Donne: Poetry, Sexuality, Interpretation, Do the Gods Wear Capes?, and numerous volumes on comics and cartoons. Saunders is also series editor of the Penguin Classics Marvel series, which publishes Marvel comics in curated anthologies. In the words of one critic, the Penguin Classics Marvel Collection, which features a series of stories from the early days of Spider-Man, Captain America, and Black Panther, is "the jubilant acknowledgment of a birthright" and an acknowledgment of the artistic and cultural significance of comic art.

Saunder has lectured globally as an authority on the history of comic books, and is the curator of multiple museum exhibitions on comic art and popular culture. His exhibition, Marvel: Universe of Super Heroes, showcased the history and impact of Marvel Comics on the world of entertainment and has been exhibited at the Museum of Pop Culture in Seattle, Washington, the Franklin Institute in Philadelphia, the Museum of Science and Industry in Chicago, and Discovery Place in Charlotte, North Carolina. His most recent exhibition, Jack Kirby: Heroes and Humanity (co-curated with Patrick A. Reed), focused on artist Jack Kirby, creator of some of the most influential comics in American history, including Captain America, The Fantastic Four, The Avengers, OMAC, X-Men, The Black Panther, Mister Miracle, and The Incredible Hulk. The exhibition was described by one critic as "A powerful and heartfelt tribute to one of the most influential yet underappreciated figures in American pop culture, the show masterfully blends art, biography, and cultural history to celebrate the legendary comic book artist behind some of the most iconic superheroes of all time."

Saunders also served as a judge for the 2012 Eisner Awards and has appeared in the 2017 History Channel documentary, Superheroes Decoded.

== Bibliography ==
- Comic Book Apocalypse: The Graphic World of Jack Kirby (co-edited with Charles Hatfield) (2016)
- Do The Gods Wear Capes: Spirituality, Fantasy, and Superheroes (2011)
- Desiring Donne: Poetry, Sexuality, Interpretation (2006)
- Rock Over the Edge: Transformations in Popular Music Culture (co-edited with Denise Fulbrook and Roger Beebe) (2002)
- Penguin Classics Marvel Collection Series (Series Editor, Series Introductions) (2022)

== Museum exhibit curation ==
- Faster Than A Speeding Bullet: The Art of the Superhero, Jordan Schnitzer Museum of Art, Eugene, Oregon, 2009
- Good Grief! A Selection of Original Art From Fifty Years of Charles M Schulz’s Peanuts, Jordan Schnitzer Museum of Art, Eugene, Oregon, 2012
- Aliens, Monsters, and Madmen: The Art of EC Comics, Jordan Schnitzer Museum of Art, Eugene, Oregon, 2016
- Marvel: Universe of Super Heroes, Museum of Pop Culture, Seattle, Washington, 2018
- Spider-Man: Beyond Amazing - The Exhibition, Comic-Con Museum, San Diego, California, 2022
- Jack Kirby: Heroes and Humanity

== Awards ==
- San Diego Comic-Con Inkpot Award (July 21, 2023)
