= PunditWire =

News commentary site

PunditWire is a news commentary site featuring contributors from across the political spectrum who are all current or former political speechwriters. Launched on September 13, 2010, the content on PunditWire varies in scope – from foreign policy to campaigns and elections to civil rights and political rhetoric. The website is sponsored by American University in Washington, D.C., and was conceived by American University Professor Leonard Steinhorn, a former political speechwriter and strategist, and Robert Lehrman, adjunct professor in the School of Communication at American University and former speechwriter for Al Gore.

== Content ==
Every contributor to PunditWire is or has been a political speechwriter. These contributors have worked on political campaigns, Capitol Hill, and in the White House. PunditWire is a forum for these speechwriters to post their own commentary on current affairs.

PunditWire articles feature insider perspectives from the people who normally write for politicians. The goal of the website is to provide commentary that gives readers special insight into the language of politics.

== Contributors ==
- Dan Conley – Professional speechwriter and frequent op-ed contributor to major national publications
- Hal Gordon – Professional speechwriter; was a speechwriter in the Reagan White House
- Dave Helfert – Political and governmental communicator; Professor of political communication at American University and Johns Hopkins
- Jim Jaffe – Currently a freelancer who blogs on health issues at Centeredpolitics.com, and the Huffington Post
- David Kusnet – Author and speechwriter; Chief Speechwriter for former President Bill Clinton from 1992 through 1994
- Robert Lehrman – Author, speechwriter, and professor of communication at American University
- Paul Liben – Speechwriter; Op-eds contributor for more than 100 publications, including the Wall Street Journal, Los Angeles Times, Washington Times
- Mike Long – Author, essayist, and speechwriter; adjunct professor at Georgetown University
- Lissa Muscatine – Senior Adviser and Director of Speechwriting at the U.S. State Department
- Bob Neuman – Author and communication consultant; president of Neuman and Company
- Noam Neusner – Founding principal of 30 Point Strategies, which focuses on strategic communications, speechwriting, media relations, and policy-specific writing
- Eric Schnure – Speechwriter; Co-founder of the Humor Cabinet; Principal at the Dewey Square Group; adjunct professor at American University
- Leonard Steinhorn – Former speechwriter; Professor of communication at American University
- Carol Whitney – Author; Political strategist with expertise in message development
- Ted Widmer – Former speechwriter and advisor for President Bill Clinton; Director and Librarian of the John Carter Brown Library at Brown University
- Antonio (Tony) Williams – Speechwriter; Director of Government Affairs for Comcast Cable
- Chriss Winston – Speechwriter for President George H. W. Bush; Communication consultant; teaching Fellow at Harvard University's Institute of Politics

== Daily Quotes ==
PunditWire features daily quotes provided by American University's Simpson Fellows who continue the mission of Reverend James Simpson's Contemporary Quotations: The Most Notable Quotes From 1950 to the Present.
