= Gray Loeffler =

Gray Loeffler LLC was an advisory and consulting firm (lobbying firm), representing clients' interests before government electoral apparatus and agencies. It was co-founded with a merger in September 2009 of the Amani Group led by former Democratic congressman and Democratic Party Whip, William H. Gray III of Pennsylvania, and the Republican congressman from Texas, Thomas Loeffler and his firm, the Loeffler Group. Tom Loeffler was a key fundraiser and "general co-chairman for the 2008 Republican Presidential candidate, John McCain, who was forced to resign when Newsweek Magazine disclosed that he was a lobbyist on behalf of Saudi Arabia and had received $15 million in compensation from the Saudi Arabian government since 2002.

The firm established offices located in Washington, D.C., Austin, Texas, San Antonio, Texas, Philadelphia, Pennsylvania and Miami, Florida.

Gray Loeffler were recently retained at the end of 2009 to help lobby the efforts of the Comcast and Universal Studios merger before the respective House and Senate congressional committees that will have to approve the corporate combination.

Another prominent client, General Motors, retained Gray Loeffler for "general lobbying services" in 2010, to protect their interests on a federal level. It was unspecified by GM exactly what those services would include.
