= Robert Lehrman =

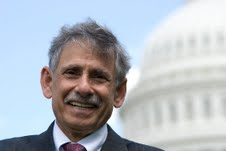

Robert A. Lehrman is an American novelist, commentator, speechwriter, and teacher.

Former White House chief speechwriter for Vice President Al Gore (1993–1995), Lehrman has written or co-written seven books, including several award-winning novels, and thousands of speeches for Democratic politicians, corporate and nonprofit CEOs, and celebrities. Lehrman writes op-eds and articles under his own name, and gives workshops both around the U.S. and abroad. He is best known for his non-fiction book, The Political Speechwriter’s Companion: A Guide for Writers and Speakers, systematic look at the techniques and strategies of modern political speech, that has sold steadily for a decade and recently appeared in a second edition co-written by him and collaborator Eric Schnure.

== Early life ==
Born in Brooklyn, NY, Lehrman grew up in Queens and Cedarhurst, Long Island. His parents, Harry Lehrman and Beatrice Ginsburg, were the children of Jewish immigrants from Belarus. Lehrman's father spent much of his life in the fork lift business and ran his own company, Lehrman Equipment, for many years, while Lehrman's mother returned to Brooklyn College, finishing when she was 42. She got a master's degree in English at NYU, and taught English at Lawrence High School on Long Island. Lehrman has one brother, David, first a professional violinist, then a lawyer with the federal government.

== Education ==
Lehrman ran track and was sports editor of the yearbook at Lawrence High, then Tufts University, where he majored in English, wrote for the Tufts Weekly, was fiction editor of Tuftonian, the Tufts literary magazine, and a three-year starter on the Tufts soccer team. In 1965 he entered the university of Iowa Writers' Workshop, where he studied under Kurt Vonnegut and Richard Yates, taught rhetoric and speech, and in 1968 graduated with an M.F.A.

== Professional background ==
=== Career: Illinois, 1971-1977 ===
In 1970, Lehrman began teaching at Muscatine (Iowa) Community College. Continuing to live in Iowa City, he ran for City Council there winning in the Primary, but losing in the General. In 1972, he joined the Illinois gubernatorial campaign of Dan Walker as a field organizer, and when Walker won became the new Governor's speechwriter. Lehrman wrote several hundred speeches for Governor Walker, before resigning in 1975 to write articles for Illinois Times, and WomenSports, and, with Phyllis Elperin Clark, his first book, Doing Time (Hastings House, 1980), a young adult book about prisons Doing Time won a Jane Addams Honor Book award in 1981.

=== Career: New York, 1977-1987 ===
After moving to New York in 1977, Lehrman wrote for New York's governor Hugh Carey, then combined corporate speechwriting and writing under his own name for a decade. He wrote speeches for the CEO and other officers of Texaco, Inc. from 1978 to 1986. In 1982, Harper & Row published his first novel, Juggling, an American Library Association "Best Book" for that year. Lehrman wrote two other YA novels during that time. One of them, The Store That Mama Built, was one of three finalists for the 1993 National Jewish Book Award for Children's Literature. In 1988, Lehrman published Defectors (Arbor House, Morrow, 1988), a well-received novel for adults, set during the Cold War.

=== Career: Washington, D.C., 1978-present ===
Moving to Washington, D.C., in 1987, Lehrman spent a year writing for the CEO of Fannie Mae, then became chief speechwriter first for Senator Lloyd Bentsen (D-TX), and Democratic House Majority Whips William H. Gray (D-PA) and David Bonior (D-MI) before moving to the White House as Vice President Al Gore's first Chief Speechwriter. He wrote over 250 speeches for Gore and edited about the same number, before beginning his own business, Lehrman Communications, in 1996. Since then, Lehrman has written over 1000 speeches for corporate, nonprofit, and political clients, with two timeouts: a 2004 stint as chief speechwriter for the Democratic National Committee, and a 2008-2009 position as speechwriter for Pfizer's CEO.

=== Teaching ===
In 1998, Lehrman began teaching as an adjunct at American University. Starting with a variety of communications courses, Lehrman focused on public speaking and in 2005 created American University's political speechwriting course. He has continued both, often with co-teachers Jeffrey Nussbaum and Eric Schnure. The popular course has sent dozens of alums into political, corporate, and other full-time speechwriting careers. Meanwhile, he has given workshops around the world, and, along with American University Professor Leonard Steinhorn, cofounded the commentary site PunditWire, a forum for speechwriters to escape anonymity through bylined essays about speech.

"He is the Dean of speechwriting", says David Murray, editor of Vital Speeches of the Day and founder of the Professional Speechwriter's Association, emphasizing Lehrman's role in teaching a "new generation of Americans". In 2010, American University named Lehrman its adjunct professor of the Year, one of only 5 all-university awards given by the school, in part for Lehrman's book and influence on how to write political speeches.

=== Books and published works ===
==== Nonfiction ====
===== The Political Speechwriter's Companion, 2009 (CQ, Press) =====
In 2008 Lehrman began writing "Companion," finishing the next year. He used over two hundred examples taken mostly from American political speeches to demonstrate how one structure, Monroe's Motivated Sequence, and what he calls the LAWS of political speech—language, anecdote, wit, and support—can be effective in almost any political setting.

In chapters that included speeches and excerpts annotated to show how each technique worked, Lehrman analyzed ways to be effective, whether on the stump, on the Floor, or in ceremonial speeches ranging from commencements to eulogies to keynotes. He also presented an original way to close speeches that has been compared to what Alan Monroe did for the motivated sequence.

The book won praise from a wide and bipartisan assortment of politicians and journalists. In 2016, SAGE Publishers, now CQ Press's parent company, decided to bring Speechwriter's Companion out in an expanded second edition. For that, Schnure joined him. Lehrman and Schnure spent almost two years revising and expanding the book. Adding over a hundred pages, and broadening its scope in such areas as ethics, the book won a foreword by longtime Republican Senator Lamar Alexander. Vital Speeches of the Day reviewer Jack Rraby called the book "a worthy successor to its beloved predecessor", while former Wall Street Journal Bureau Chief Al Hunt, called it "A classic for anyone who cares about speech or covers it."

===== Democratic Orators from JFK to Barack Obama, 2016 (Palgrave Macmillan UK) =====
Democratic Orators from JFK to Barack Obama analyzes the speeches of leading Democrats from John F. Kennedy to Hillary Clinton. Written and edited by Lehrman, along with British Professors Andrew S. Crines and David S. Moon, the book, released in 2016, with a foreword by Bonior, won praise from academics. Gillian Peele, emeritus Professor in Politics at the University of Oxford, called the book "a powerful and impressive contribution to our understanding of the interlocking themes of oratory, rhetoric and leadership in the United States." Lehrman wrote the chapters on JFK, Jimmy Carter, and Barack Obama.

=== Novels ===
Lehrman's 4 novels, mentioned above, include three for young adults and one for grownups.

Juggling (Harper & Row, 1982) set in the 1960s about a high school soccer player and his first romance, became controversial because of its frankness about teenage life, but won wide praise for nuance and authenticity, winning an American Library Association Best Book award, in 1983 and many other honors. "An astonishing debut", wrote Richard Yates. In 1987, Ms. Magazine, celebrating its 15th anniversary, named the novel one of "15 Great Books for Teenagers" that had appeared during the life of the magazine.

Separations (Penguin, 1990; paperback Puffin, 1995): is another novel with a sports theme, Separations tells the story of Kim, a teen-age tennis player, whose father leaves home, meaning she and her mother move to Manhattan where she wrestles with ways to cope with a game that hasn't come together—and a family torn apart. "Lehrman makes us care about Kim's personal struggle to win at her own game", wrote Booklist.

Defectors (Arbor House/Morrow, 1988, Japanese edition, 1990) Set in the 1950s, this novel for adults also featured a sports theme: the narrator is an American miler who befriends a Soviet defector, also a runner, and wrestles with what to do when the United States decides to send the defector back. "Strong first novel ... extraordinarily evocative", said Publishers Weekly, while Seven Percent Solution author Nicholas Meyer wrote, "rich in its exploration of moral complexities, wonderfully evocative of a time and place."

The Store that Mama Built (Simon & Schuster Children's Publishing, 1992; German edition 1995). Based on Lehrman's own family, this finalist (one of three) for the 1993 National Jewish Book Award for Juvenile Literature tells the story of a Jewish immigrant family struggling to keep their store in business after the father's death.

==== Other published works ====
Lehrman frequently writes under his own name and speaks about politics and speech. His articles, reviews, and short stories have appeared in The Washington Post, The New York Times, Politico, The Hill, WomenSports, St. Louis Post-Dispatch, Illinois Times, Public Relations Journal, Transatlantic Review, Louisville Review, Tufts Magazine, and others. He wrote a widely read series of cover stories for The Christian Science Monitor Weekly Magazine and his documentary scripts include Bradley Whitford's narration for Alliance for Justice award-winning 2007 film Quiet Revolution.

=== Personal life ===
For over four decades Lehrman has been married to Dr. Susan Thaul, an epidemiologist whose distinguished career in public health saw her serve with the United States Senate, the Institute of Medicine, and, most recently, the Congressional Research Service. They have two children, Michael and Eric, both with careers in film and TV, and three adorable grandchildren, Theo, Miles, and Tess.

==== Selected articles ====
- "State of the Union: The crafting of a speech" (Christian Science Monitor cover story, January 2011)
- "Friends, Romans, Countrymen" (Tufts Magazine cover story, Summer 2010)
- "The Political Speechwriter's Life" (New York Times, invited piece, 2012)
- "Turning 50: The Tragedy of Tokin Gulf" (The Hill, 2014)
- "Trump's Letter to Pelosi" (The Hill, 2019)

==== Interviews and online appearances ====
- The Speech That Made Obama President, THNKR
- Chat from the Old Cap, University of Iowa video interview
