= Tony Coelho =

American politician from California (born 1942)

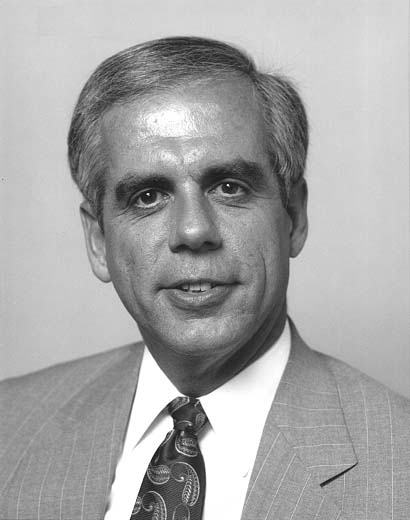

House Majority Whip
- In office January 3, 1987 – June 15, 1989
- Leader: Jim Wright
- Preceded by: Tom Foley
- Succeeded by: William H. Gray III

Chair of the Democratic Congressional Campaign Committee
- In office January 3, 1981 – January 3, 1987
- Leader: Tip O'Neill
- Preceded by: James C. Corman
- Succeeded by: Beryl Anthony Jr.

Member of the U.S. House of Representatives from California's 15th district
- In office January 3, 1979 – June 15, 1989
- Preceded by: B. F. Sisk
- Succeeded by: Gary Condit

Personal details
- Born: Anthony Lee Coelho; June 15, 1942 (age 84) Los Banos, California, U.S.
- Party: Democratic
- Education: Loyola Marymount University (BA)
- Coelho's voice Coelho supporting the Indian Gaming Regulatory Act; Recorded September 26, 1988

Anthony Lee Coelho (born June 15, 1942) is an American politician from California who served in the United States House of Representatives. A member of the Democratic Party, he was the primary sponsor of the Americans with Disabilities Act and is a former chairman and current member of the board of directors of the Epilepsy Foundation.

== Early life and education ==
Coelho was born in rural Los Banos, California to parents of Portuguese descent. Coelho attended public schools in nearby Dos Palos, and grew up working on his family's dairy farm. At age 16, Coelho was injured in a pickup truck accident, which doctors later suggested was the precipitating event for the onset of his epilepsy. For years after the accident, Coelho did not know he had the illness.

Coelho graduated with a B.A. from Loyola University of Los Angeles (now Loyola Marymount University) in 1964. At Loyola, he was initiated as a member of the Phi Sigma Kappa fraternity and a member of the Crimson Circle, and later was elected Student Body President during his senior year.

After the Kennedy assassination, Coelho decided to become a priest. He went to a doctor for a medical exam, a prerequisite for entering the seminary. The doctor informed him that he had epilepsy. Because of canon law, he was unable to become a priest. Once his diagnosis was reported to the state, Coelho lost both his driver's license and his health insurance.

== Career ==
Coelho worked as a staff member for Representative Bernie Sisk from 1965 until 1978. By 1970, Coelho was serving as Sisk's administrative assistant (chief of staff). He enhanced his expertise in agriculture policy as staff director for the House Agriculture Subcommittee on Cotton. As staff coordinator for the House Rules Subcommittee on Broadcasting, on which Sisk served, Coelho helped develop the procedures that made possible the television coverage of the House proceedings via C-SPAN. When Sisk retired, Coelho ran for his seat and won.

During his first campaign for Congress, Coelho's opponent asked how people would feel if Coelho went to a meeting at the White House and had a seizure. "The press called me and the good Lord was with me", Coelho later related. "Off the top of my head I said, 'Well, in the 13 years I have served in Washington I knew a lot of people who went to the White House and had fits. At least I'd have an excuse."

=== Congress ===
In November 1978, Coelho was elected to the 96th Congress. He was later elected to the five succeeding Congresses where he served until his resignation on June 15, 1989. He served on the Agriculture, Interior, Veterans Affairs, and Administration Committees during his tenure. However he specialized in rights of disabled people.

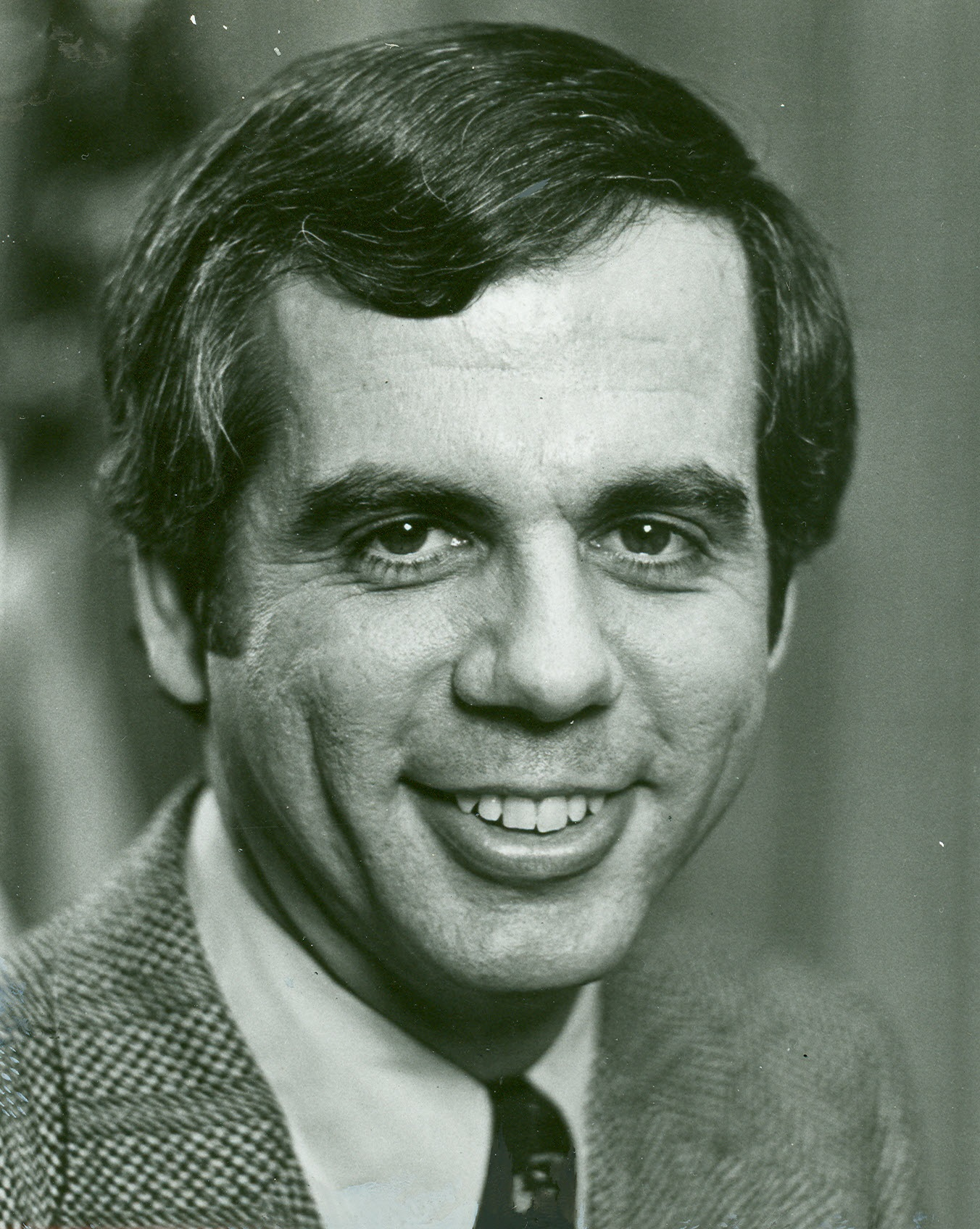
Tony Coelho

In 1980, Coelho was named chairman of the Democratic Congressional Campaign Committee, a Hill committee that supports Democratic Party candidates. As the Washington Post observed, "They made the sophomore congressman from central California, their chief House fund-raiser, a position not bestowed on such a junior member since it was given to a young Texas congressman named Lyndon B. Johnson in 1940." Coelho raised money from businesses, which later Ralph Nader would blame for changing the party.

As a member of the House leadership, Coelho helped lead the effort to pin the political blame for enactment of the Reagan economic program on the Republicans in the House. One Democratic campaign advertisement, airing early in the 1982 election season, featured scissors cutting a Social Security card and a voice accusing Republicans of trying to cut benefits.

In 1986, Coelho was elected House Majority Whip. As the chief vote counter for his party, Coelho oversaw a series of Democratic victories in the House on measures ranging from the budget to cutting off funds for the war in Central America.

In 1989, Coelho resigned from the House after six terms in the wake of press reports that he had received a loan from a savings and loan executive to purchase junk bonds. He was not charged with any crime.

While in the House, he was a member of the Congressional Hispanic Caucus.

Coelho was credited by congressional colleagues as the primary sponsor of the Americans with Disabilities Act, which was signed into law by President George H. W. Bush. By 1994, four years after the law's passage, the U.S. Census Bureau reported that some 800,000 more people with severe disabilities had found employment than had been employed when the ADA was first enacted.

=== Later career ===
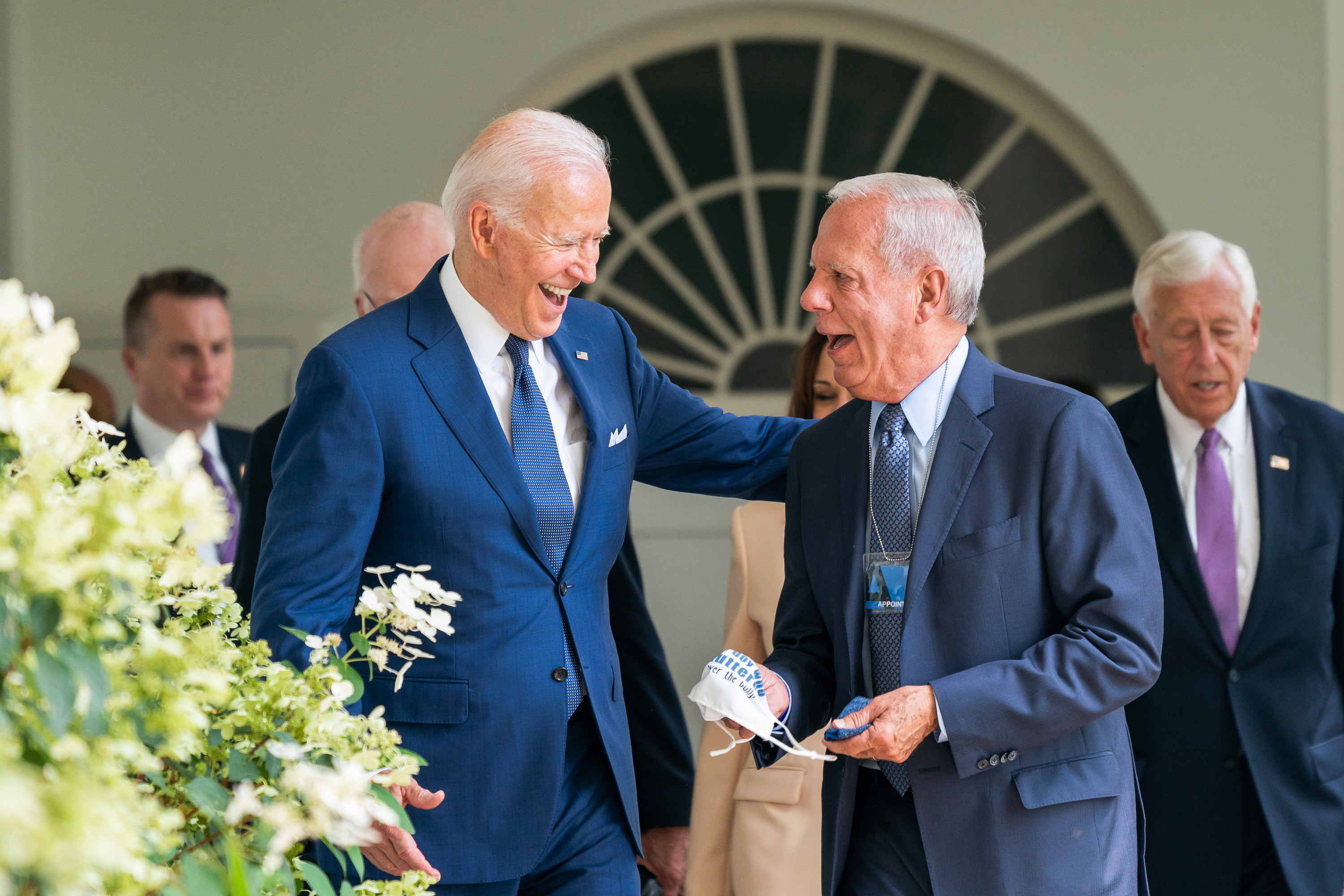
Coelho with President Joe Biden in July 2021

Since his retirement from Congress, Coelho has pursued careers in business and public service, while remaining active in the disabilities community.

After leaving Congress, he joined investment firm Wertheim Schroder & Company as a managing director.

From 1990 to 1995, he also served as president and CEO of Wertheim Schroder Investment Services, which grew from $400 million to $4 billion in managed investments under his management.

In 1995, Coelho formed ETC w/tci, an education and training technology company in Washington, D.C.. He was the chairman and chief executive officer until 1997.

President Bill Clinton appointed Coelho to serve as chairman of the President's Committee on Employment of People with Disabilities, a position he held from 1994 to 2001; he also served as Vice Chair of the National Task Force on Employment of Adults with Disabilities. In 1998, Clinton appointed Coelho as the United States Commissioner General at the 1998 World Expo in Portugal. Clinton also appointed Coelho as co-chair to the U.S. Census Monitoring Board, a position he held until his appointment as general chairman of the Gore Presidential campaign.

In the summer of 1994, Coelho was the principal Democratic political strategist during the run-up to the mid-term Congressional elections. Officially, he was Senior Advisor to the Democratic National Committee. The Republican Party won a landslide victory in the fall congressional elections, capturing both the House and Senate by commanding margins.

On November 29, 1994, then-Speaker of the House Tom Foley appointed Coelho as one of 17 members of the Aspin–Brown Commission. Congress created the commission to study what intelligence agencies should do after the Cold War, and was charged with preparing a report of its findings and recommendations to the President and the Congress.

In 1999, Coelho was made chairman of Vice President Al Gore's presidential campaign. During his tenure, Coelho moved the campaign headquarters from Washington, D.C. to Nashville. He oversaw an overhaul of the campaign's message and strategy, and changed personnel and consultants. Gore prevailed over former Senator Bill Bradley in the Democratic primaries of 2000 in every primary and caucus contest and received the Democratic nomination to be president.

Before the 2000 Democratic National Convention, Coelho became ill and resigned his position as general campaign chairman. Doctors later found and removed a tumor on the left side of his brain. He was replaced by former Commerce Secretary William M. Daley. He participates annually at New York Law School with its Tony Coelho Lecture in Disability Employment Law & Policy. He has endowed a chair in public policy at the University of California, Merced. He is the chairman of the board of directors of the Epilepsy Foundation. He partnered with NBCUniversal and the American Association of People with Disabilities (AAPD) to create the NBCUniversal Tony Coelho Media Scholarship, which encourages people with disabilities to pursue media-related degrees and careers. He is a former chairman and current member of the board of directors of the American Association of People With Disabilities. He also sits on the Council on American Politics, the advisory board of George Washington University Graduate School of Political Management. Coelho served as an advisor of ZeniMax Media as well. Coelho serves as a founding partner of Vectis Strategies, a national public affairs firm.

Coelho was one of the recipients of the inaugural Henry Viscardi Achievement Awards in 2013.

In 2015, the National Disability Mentoring Coalition named Coelho an inaugural inductee to Susan M. Daniels Disability Mentoring Hall of Fame for his commitment to mentoring and improving the lives of people with disabilities.

Coelho was named a vice-chair of the 2020 Democratic National Convention.

== Electoral history ==
1978 United States House of Representatives elections in California
| Party | Candidate | Votes | % |
|---|---|---|---|
| Democratic | Tony Coelho | 75,212 | 60.1 |
| Republican | Chris Patterakis | 49,914 | 39.9 |
| Total votes | | 125,126 | 100.0 |
| Turnout | | | |
| Democratic hold | | | |

1980 United States House of Representatives elections in California
| Party | Candidate | Votes | % |
|---|---|---|---|
| Democratic | Tony Coelho (Incumbent) | 108,072 | 71.8 |
| Republican | Ron Schwartz | 37,895 | 25.2 |
| Libertarian | Michael L. Pullen | 4,524 | 3.0 |
| Total votes | | 150,491 | 100.0 |
| Turnout | | | |
| Democratic hold | | | |

1982 United States House of Representatives elections in California
| Party | Candidate | Votes | % |
|---|---|---|---|
| Democratic | Tony Coelho (Incumbent) | 86,022 | 63.7 |
| Republican | Ed Bates | 45,948 | 34.0 |
| Libertarian | Stephen L. Gerringer | 3,073 | 2.3 |
| Total votes | | 135,043 | 100.0 |
| Turnout | | | |
| Democratic hold | | | |

1984 United States House of Representatives elections in California
| Party | Candidate | Votes | % |
|---|---|---|---|
| Democratic | Tony Coelho (Incumbent) | 109,590 | 65.5 |
| Republican | Carol Harner | 54,730 | 32.7 |
| Libertarian | Richard M. Harris | 3,086 | 1.8 |
| Total votes | | 167,406 | 100.0 |
| Turnout | | | |
| Democratic hold | | | |

1986 United States House of Representatives elections in California
| Party | Candidate | Votes | % |
|---|---|---|---|
| Democratic | Tony Coelho (Incumbent) | 93,600 | 71.0 |
| Republican | Carol Harner | 35,793 | 27.2 |
| Libertarian | Richard M. Harris | 2,382 | 1.8 |
| Total votes | | 131,775 | 100.0 |
| Turnout | | | |
| Democratic hold | | | |

1988 United States House of Representatives elections in California
| Party | Candidate | Votes | % |
|---|---|---|---|
| Democratic | Tony Coelho (Incumbent) | 118,710 | 69.8 |
| Republican | Carol Harner | 47,957 | 28.2 |
| Libertarian | Richard M. Harris | 3,526 | 2.1 |
| Total votes | | 170,193 | 100.0 |
| Total votes | | 70,753 | 41.6 |
| Turnout | | | |
| Democratic hold | | | |

== Personal life ==
Coelho now lives in Rehoboth Beach, Delaware.

== See also ==
- List of federal political scandals in the United States

U.S. House of Representatives
| Preceded by B. F. Sisk | Member of the U.S. House of Representatives from California's 15th congressional district 1979–1989 | Succeeded by Gary Condit |
| Preceded by Tom Foley | House Majority Whip; 1987–1989 | Succeeded by William H. Gray III |
Party political offices
| Preceded by James C. Corman | Chair of the Democratic Congressional Campaign Committee; 1981–1987 | Succeeded by Beryl Anthony Jr. |
U.S. order of precedence (ceremonial)
| Preceded by Eric Cantor as Former House Majority Leader | Order of precedence of the United States as Former House Majority Whip | Succeeded by David Bonior as Former House Majority Whip |
