= Tom Loeffler =

American politician (born 1946)

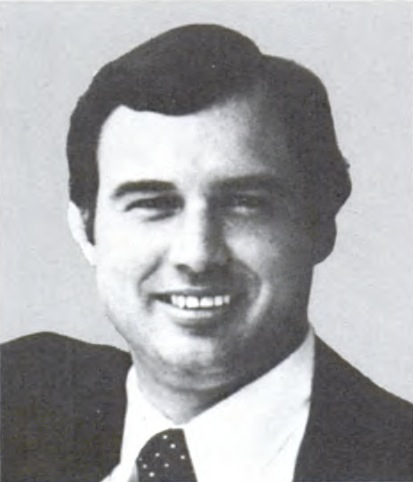

House Republican Chief Deputy Whip
- In office January 3, 1983 – January 3, 1987
- Leader: Bob Michel
- Preceded by: David F. Emery
- Succeeded by: Edward Rell Madigan

Member of the U.S. House of Representatives from Texas's 21st district
- In office January 3, 1979 – January 3, 1987
- Preceded by: Bob Krueger
- Succeeded by: Lamar Smith

Personal details
- Born: Thomas Gilbert Loeffler; August 1, 1946 (age 80) Fredericksburg, Texas, U.S.
- Party: Republican
- Spouse: Susan Loeffler
- Children: 3
- Education: University of Texas, Austin (BBA, JD)

Thomas Gilbert Loeffler (born August 1, 1946) is an American politician and Republican former member of the United States House of Representatives from central Texas. He served four terms from 1979 to 1987.

== Biography ==
Loeffler was born in Fredericksburg in the heart of the Texas Hill Country and attended school in Mason in Mason County. He earned a BBA and a Juris Doctor degrees from the University of Texas at Austin and the University of Texas School of Law. At Texas, he was on the football team in 1965-66, but did not letter. In 1971, after just one year of private practice, he was hired by the U.S. Department of Commerce. Republican U.S. Senator John Tower made Loeffler his chief counsel in 1972. Two years later, he became a deputy for the United States Department of Energy.

=== Political career ===
Loeffler was a legislative assistant to U.S. President Gerald Ford, from 1975 to 1977. He successfully ran for Congress in 1978 against the Democrat Nelson Wolff, now the county judge of Bexar County. The two-term Democratic incumbent, Bob Krueger, gave up the seat to make an unsuccessful run for the Senate. Loeffler won in a landslide, taking 57 percent of the vote against Wolff–a sharp turnabout from 1976, in which Krueger took 71 percent of the vote. However, the district had been moving away from its Democratic roots for some time. He would never face another contest nearly as close as his first one, and was reelected three more times by over 70 percent of the vote.

Loeffler was a delegate to all three Republican National Conventions during the 1980s.

=== Later career ===
After four terms in the House, he stepped down to run for governor of Texas but lost a hard-fought Republican primary election to the eventual winner, Bill Clements. Another losing contender was former U.S. Representative Kent Hance, who had defeated George W. Bush for Congress in 1978 in the Lubbock-based district. After his congressional career, Loeffler was appointed to the Office of Legislative Affairs as the coordinator for Central American policies.

In 1989, Loeffler became a University of Texas administrator. He later co-founded the lobbying firm Gray Loeffler LLC, representing clients including the Kingdom of Saudi Arabia. Like Loeffler, Clements also was active in the McCain presidential campaign.

Loeffler is the father of former Minnesota Vikings long snapper Cullen Loeffler. His other son, Lance Loeffler, became an oil and gas executive with Halliburton. Lance previously worked in investment banking, holding senior level positions with both Deutsche Bank in their energy practice and UBS in their energy and healthcare practices.

U.S. House of Representatives
Preceded by Bob Krueger	Member of the U.S. House of Representatives from Texas's 21st congressional district 1979–1987	Succeeded by Lamar Smith
Party political offices
Preceded by David F. Emery	House Republican Chief Deputy Whip; 1983–1987	Succeeded by Edward Rell Madigan
U.S. order of precedence (ceremonial)
Preceded by Matt Gaetz as Former U.S. Representative	Order of precedence of the United States as Former U.S. Representative	Succeeded by Steve Bartlett as Former U.S. Representative
