= William H. Gray III =

American politician (1941–2013)

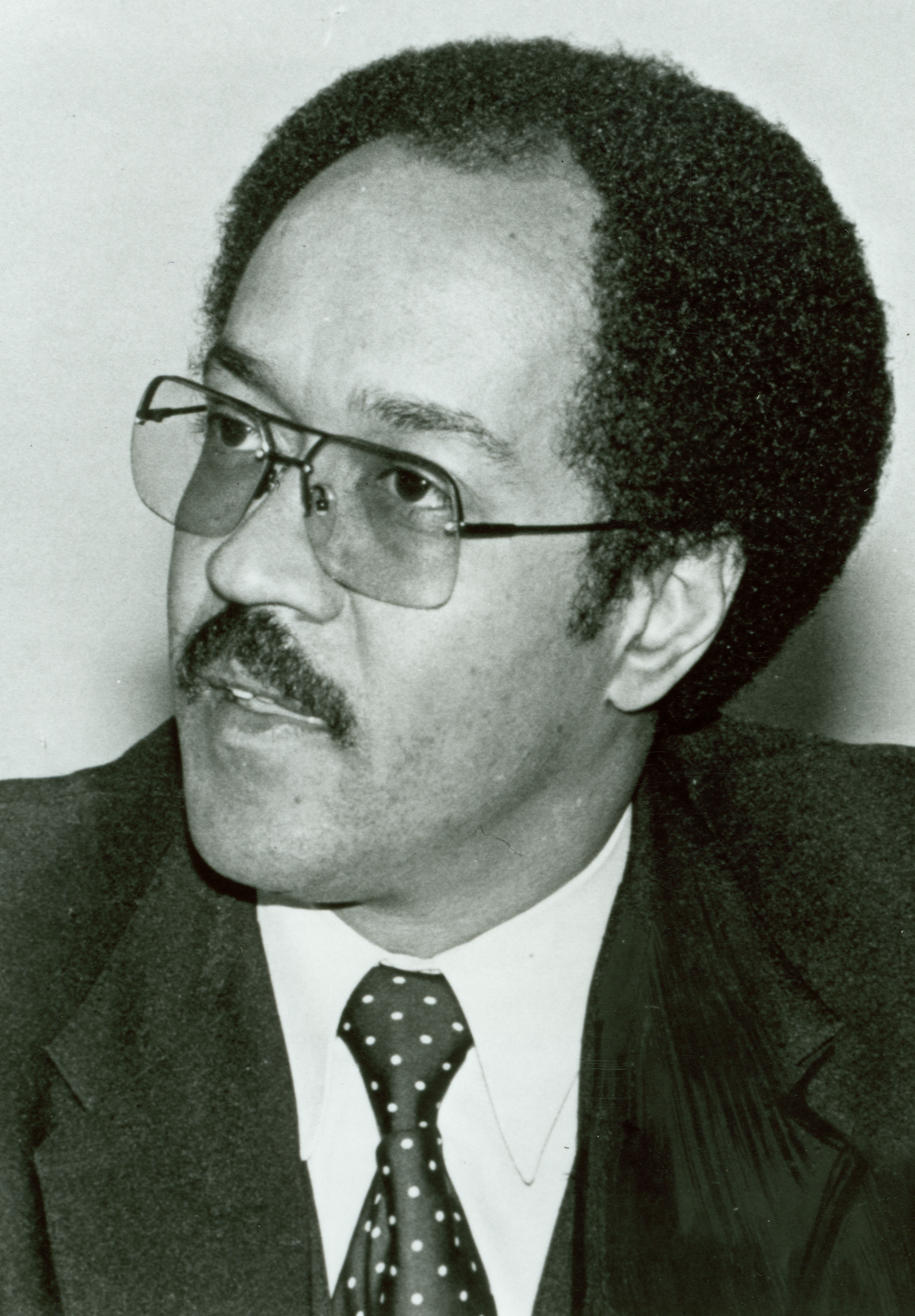

House Majority Whip
- In office June 15, 1989 – September 11, 1991
- Leader: Tom Foley
- Preceded by: Tony Coelho
- Succeeded by: David Bonior

Chair of the House Democratic Caucus
- In office January 3, 1989 – June 15, 1989
- Leader: Jim Wright; Tom Foley
- Preceded by: Dick Gephardt
- Succeeded by: Steny Hoyer

Chair of the House Budget Committee
- In office January 3, 1985 – January 3, 1989
- Preceded by: James R. Jones
- Succeeded by: Leon Panetta

Member of the U.S. House of Representatives from Pennsylvania's 2nd district
- In office January 3, 1979 – September 11, 1991
- Preceded by: Robert N. C. Nix Sr.
- Succeeded by: Lucien E. Blackwell

Personal details
- Born: William Herbert Gray III; August 20, 1941 Baton Rouge, Louisiana, U.S.
- Died: July 1, 2013 (aged 71) London, England
- Party: Democratic
- Spouse: Andrea Dash
- Children: 3
- Education: Franklin and Marshall College (BA); Drew University (MDiv); Princeton Theological Seminary (ThM)
- William H. Gray's voice Gray speaks on the coming end of apartheid under F. W. de Klerk; Recorded June 7, 1990

William Herbert Gray III (August 20, 1941 – July 1, 2013) was an American politician and member of the Democratic Party who represented Pennsylvania's 2nd congressional district from 1979 to 1991. He also served as chairman of the House Committee on the Budget from 1985 to 1989 and House Majority Whip from 1989 to 1991. He resigned from Congress in September of that year to become president and chief executive officer of the United Negro College Fund, a position he held until 2004.

He was the fourth-highest-ranking member of the House at the time of his resignation and a minister in Philadelphia.

== Early life ==
Gray was born in Baton Rouge, Louisiana, and spent his early years in Florida, where his father was president of Florida Normal and Industrial Institute in Miami Gardens, and then of Florida A & M College in Tallahassee. In 1949, upon the death of his grandfather, Gray's family moved to North Philadelphia, Pennsylvania, where he graduated from Simon Gratz High School. He attended Franklin & Marshall College, where he received a bachelor's degree in 1963. He went on to obtain a master's in divinity from Drew University in 1966 and a master's in theology from Princeton Theological Seminary in 1970. Gray received a L.H.D. from Bates College in 1994.

== Career ==
In 1972, Gray succeeded his father as the senior minister at Bright Hope Baptist Church in Philadelphia. He was elected as a Democrat to represent Philadelphia in the United States House of Representatives in 1978. He represented Pennsylvania's 2nd congressional district in the House of Representatives from 1978 until his resignation on September 11, 1991. He was the first African-American to chair the House Budget Committee and also the first to serve as the Majority Whip (1989–1991). As chairman of the Committee on Budget, Gray introduced H.R. 1460, an anti-Apartheid bill that prohibited loans and new investment in South Africa and enforced sanctions on imports and exports with South Africa. This bill was an instrumental precursor to the Comprehensive Anti-Apartheid Act of 1986 (H.R. 4868).

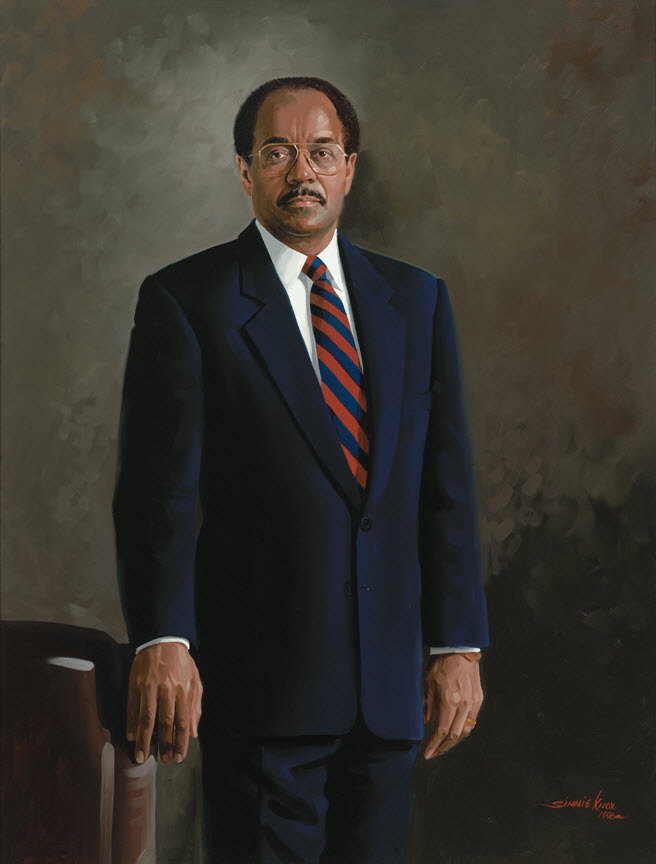
Portrait of Gray in the Collection of the U.S. House of Representatives

Gray resigned unexpectedly from Congress in 1991 to serve as president of the United Negro College Fund from 1991 to 2004. The move was considered surprising and prompted speculation that it may have been connected with an investigation into alleged campaign finance violations by the Gray team. A Pennsylvania Senate seat had been left vacant when Senator John Heinz was killed in a plane crash. Major-party candidates were chosen by the party committees because it was too late for a primary. The speculation was that Attorney General Dick Thornburgh struck a deal with Gray, who not only had been the subject of an investigation into campaign finance irregularities but also a grand jury investigation into his church's financial affairs. It was reported that Gray agreed not run in the special election and in return Thornburgh would drop the investigations. Thornburgh resigned as Attorney General and ran for the Senate seat himself, though he lost in an upset to Democrat Harris Wofford. Gray left the United Negro College Fund in 2004 and would later become co-founder of the government lobbying firm Gray Loeffler LLC.

Gray served as a special adviser to the President and Secretary of State for Haitian affairs in 1994. He was named to the PoliticsPA list of "Pennsylvania's Top Political Activists."

Outside politics he was also a businessman who has been a director at Dell from 2000. Gray was a director of J.P. Morgan Chase & Co., Prudential Financial Inc., Rockwell International Corporation, Visteon Corporation and Pfizer. He retired from Bright Hope Baptist Church in 2007 and was succeeded by Kevin R. Johnson.

== Personal life ==
Gray was married to the former Andrea Dash; they had three sons. Gray was a member of Alpha Phi Alpha fraternity. Gray died on July 1, 2013, in London, while attending the Wimbledon tennis tournament.

== Awards and honors ==
In 1997, he received the Four Freedoms Award for the Freedom of Worship.

In 2014, President Barack Obama signed U.S. House resolution 4838 directing Amtrak to rename Philadelphia's 30th Street Station to William H. Gray III 30th Street Station.

== See also ==
- List of African-American United States representatives

U.S. House of Representatives
Preceded by Robert N. C. Nix Sr.	Member of the U.S. House of Representatives from Pennsylvania's 2nd congressional district 1979–1991	Succeeded by Lucien E. Blackwell
Preceded by James R. Jones	Chair of the House Budget Committee; 1985–1989	Succeeded by Leon Panetta
Preceded by Tony Coelho	House Majority Whip; 1989–1991	Succeeded by David Bonior
Party political offices
Preceded by Les AuCoin, Joe Biden, Bill Bradley, Robert Byrd, Tom Daschle, Bill Hefner, Barbara B. Kennelly, George Miller, Tip O'Neill, Paul Tsongas, Tim Wirth	Response to the State of the Union address 1984; Served alongside: Max Baucus, Joe Biden, David L. Boren, Barbara Boxer, Robert Byrd, Dante Fascell, Tom Harkin, Dee Huddleston, Carl Levin, Tip O'Neill, Claiborne Pell	Succeeded by Bill Clinton; Bob Graham; Tip O'Neill
Preceded by Bill Clinton; Bob Graham; Tip O'Neill	Response to the State of the Union address 1986; Served alongside: Tom Daschle, George Mitchell, Chuck Robb, Harriett Woods	Succeeded by Robert Byrd; Jim Wright
Preceded by Dick Gephardt	Chair of the House Democratic Caucus; 1989	Succeeded by Steny Hoyer
Preceded by Tony Coelho	House Democratic Whip; 1989–1991	Succeeded by David Bonior
