= David Bonior =

American politician (born 1945)

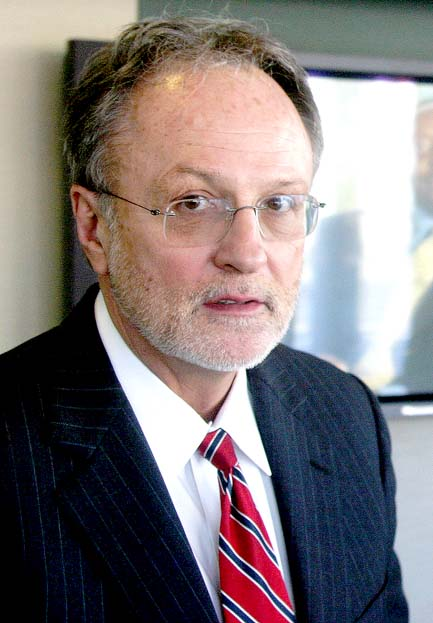
- Bonior in 2004

House Minority Whip
- In office January 3, 1995 – January 3, 2002
- Leader: Dick Gephardt
- Preceded by: Newt Gingrich
- Succeeded by: Nancy Pelosi

House Majority Whip
- In office September 11, 1991 – January 3, 1995
- Leader: Tom Foley
- Preceded by: William H. Gray III
- Succeeded by: Tom DeLay

House Democratic Chief Deputy Whip
- In office January 3, 1987 – September 11, 1991
- Leader: Jim Wright; Tom Foley
- Preceded by: Bill Alexander
- Succeeded by: John Lewis (Senior Chief Deputy Whip)

Member of the U.S. House of Representatives from Michigan
- In office January 3, 1977 – January 3, 2003
- Preceded by: James G. O'Hara
- Succeeded by: Sander Levin (redistricted)
- Constituency: 12th district (1977–1993); 10th district (1993–2003)

Member of the Michigan House of Representatives from the 75th district
- In office January 1973 – January 1977
- Preceded by: David Serotkin
- Succeeded by: David Evans

Personal details
- Born: David Edward Bonior; June 6, 1945 (age 81) Detroit, Michigan, U.S.
- Party: Democratic
- Other political affiliations: Democratic Socialists of America
- Spouse: Judy Bonior
- Education: University of Iowa (BA); Chapman University (MA)

Military service
- Allegiance: United States
- Branch/service: United States Air Force
- Years of service: 1968–1972
- Rank: Staff Sergeant
- Bonior's voice Bonior on the death of former Rep. George Crockett Jr.. Recorded September 9, 1997

David Edward Bonior (born June 6, 1945) is an American politician from the U.S. state of Michigan. First elected to the United States House of Representatives in 1976, Bonior served as Democratic whip in the House from 1991 to 2002, during which time Democrats were in both the majority (1991–1995) and minority (1995–2002), making Bonior the third and second highest-ranking Democrat in the House, respectively.

During his tenure in office, Bonior was the public face of Democratic opposition to the North American Free Trade Agreement (NAFTA), and was known for his tenacity in opposing Republican House Speaker Newt Gingrich, against whom Bonior filed more than seventy-five ethics charges.

== Early life ==
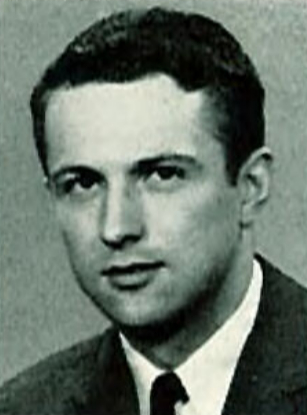
Bonior in the University of Iowa yearbook, 1966

Bonior was born in Detroit, Michigan, the son of Irene (Gavreluk) and Edward Bonior. He traces his family history from Ukraine and Poland. He graduated from Notre Dame High School in Harper Woods, Michigan, in 1963, where he excelled in sports. He received a B.A. from the University of Iowa, where he also played football and became a member of the Iowa Beta chapter of Sigma Alpha Epsilon fraternity, in 1967. He received an M.A. from Chapman College in Orange, California, in 1972.

He served in the United States Air Force during the peak of the Vietnam War from 1968 to 1972, though not in Vietnam. He was a founder of the Vietnam Era Veterans Caucus on Capitol Hill and was a strong supporter of the Vietnam veterans' movement.

== Political career ==
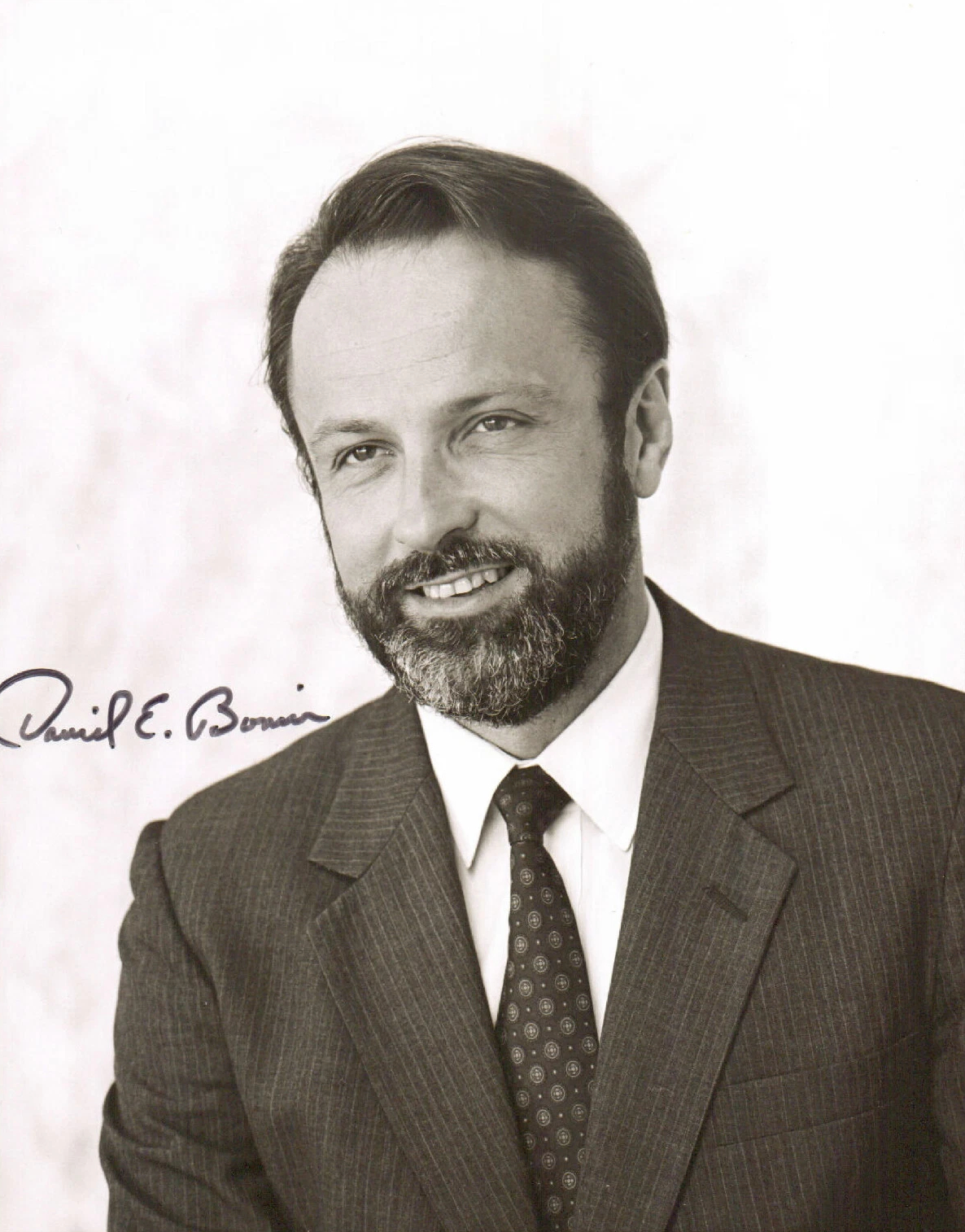
Bonior c. 1989

Bonior was a Democratic member of the Michigan State House of Representatives from 1973 to 1976. In 1976, he was elected to the U.S. House of Representatives from Michigan's 12th congressional district (based in Macomb County) for the 95th and to the twelve succeeding Congresses, serving from January 3, 1977, to January 3, 2003. His district was renumbered as the 10th in 1993, after Michigan lost a House seat as a result of the 1990 United States census. From 1991 to 2002, Bonior was the House Democratic Whip. He served as Majority Whip in the 102nd and 103rd Congresses. He was Minority Whip for the 104th through 107th Congresses. While the Democrats were in the majority, Bonior was the third-ranking Democrat in the House, behind Speaker Tom Foley and House Majority Leader Dick Gephardt. While they were in the minority, Bonior was second-in-command behind Gephardt. In Congress, Bonior generally had a progressive voting record, but opposed abortion in most cases. In 1991 he strongly supported recognition of Ukraine as an independent nation and was critical of the Bush administration on that matter. Bonior has been known as a left-liberal populist.

For most of his tenure in Congress, Bonior represented a fairly compact district in Macomb and St. Clair counties northeast of Detroit. However, after the 2000 United States census, Michigan lost one of its 16 seats in the House of Representatives. The redistricting task process was controlled by the Republican majority in the state legislature, and Bonior's home in Mount Clemens was shifted from the 10th District to the 12th District. That district had long been represented by Democrat Sander Levin, a longtime friend of Bonior's. At the same time, the state legislature radically altered the 10th, extending it all the way to the Thumb. The new district was considerably more rural and Republican than its predecessor. While George W. Bush narrowly won the old 10th, he would have won the new 10th by a large margin. Due to this, Bonior did not run for reelection to the House, and chose to run for Governor of Michigan, stepping down as House Democratic Whip in January 2002; Nancy Pelosi of California succeeded him as Whip. He lost in a heavily contested Democratic Party primary between former Governor James Blanchard, and then-Michigan Attorney General and eventual party nominee Jennifer Granholm, who went on to win the general election. Meanwhile, the 10th was won handily by Michigan Secretary of State and Macomb County resident Candice Miller, who held it until eventually retiring in 2016. Proving how Republican-dominated the district now was, no Democratic nominee has won more than 40% of the vote in the district (now numbered as the 9th) since Bonior retired.

== Post-congressional career ==
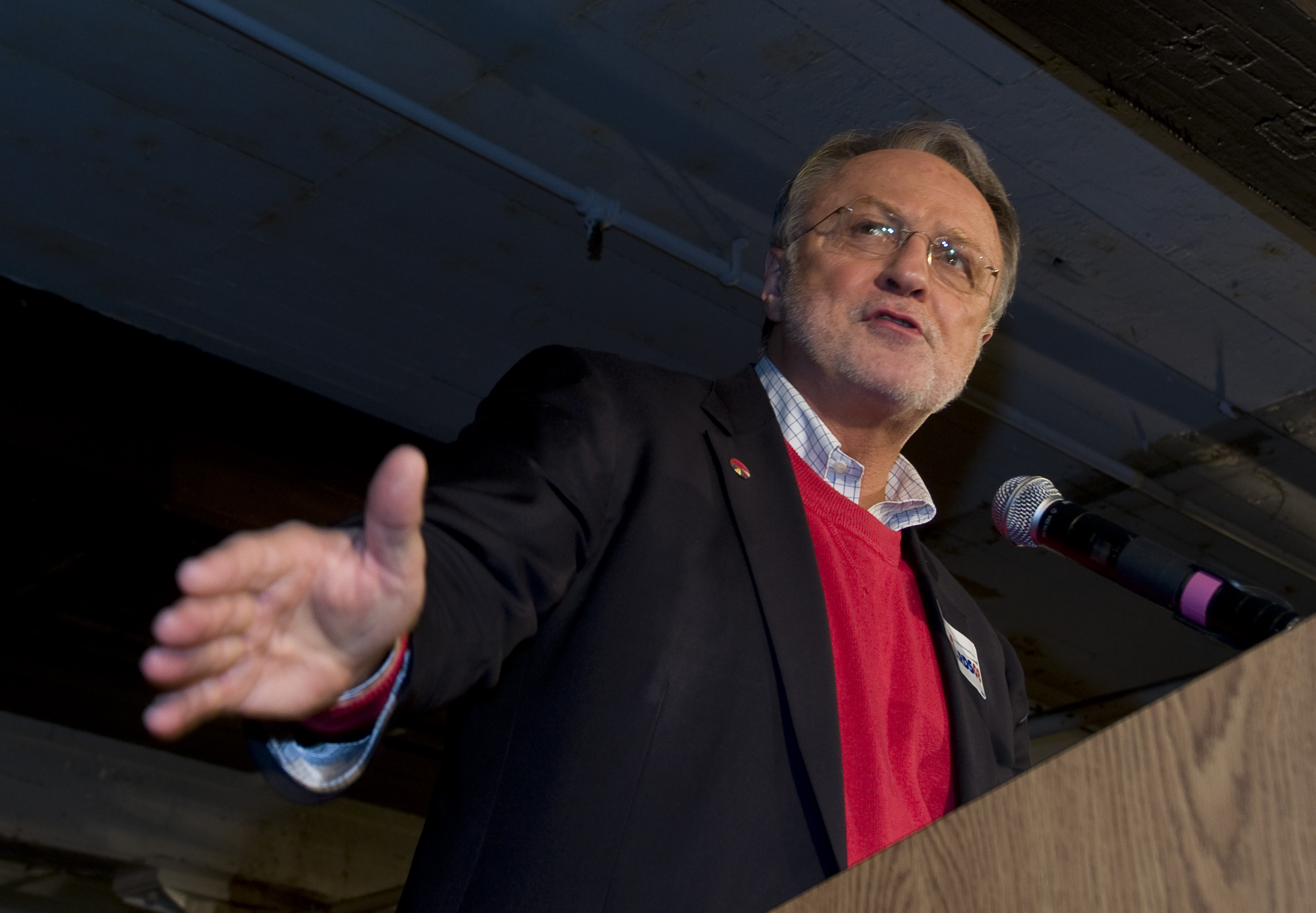
Bonior, John Edwards's campaign manager, speaks to supporters at an election night rally in Manchester, New Hampshire, January 8, 2008

Following his retirement from the House, Bonior became a professor of labor studies at Wayne State University, and founded American Rights at Work, a union advocacy organization, of which he currently serves as chairman. In 2006, former Senator John Edwards chose Bonior to run his campaign for the presidency in 2008. Bonior served as campaign manager for the duration of Edwards' candidacy. Upon the election of Barack Obama in November 2008, Bonior was a member of the President-Elect's economic advisory board.

He has also become a restaurateur, owning and operating the restaurants Agua 301 and Zest.

Bonior is a member of the ReFormers Caucus of Issue One.

Bonior and his wife were described as "longtime" members of the Democratic Socialists of America in 2015.

== See also ==
- List of Democratic Socialists of America who have held office in the United States

U.S. House of Representatives
Preceded by James G. O'Hara	Member of the U.S. House of Representatives from Michigan's 12th congressional district 1977–1993	Succeeded by Sander Levin
Preceded by William H. Gray III	House Majority Whip; 1991–1995	Succeeded by Tom DeLay
Preceded by Dave Camp	Member of the U.S. House of Representatives from Michigan's 10th congressional district 1993–2003	Succeeded by Candice Miller
Preceded by Newt Gingrich	House Minority Whip; 1995–2002	Succeeded by Nancy Pelosi
Party political offices
Preceded by Bill Alexander	House Democratic Chief Deputy Whip; 1987–1991	Succeeded by John Lewis as House Democratic Senior Chief Deputy Whip
U.S. order of precedence (ceremonial)
Preceded by Tony Coelho as Former House Majority Whip	Order of precedence of the United States as Former House Majority Whip	Succeeded by Jim Sensenbrenner as Former US Representative
