= Party leaders of the United States House of Representatives =

Current House leaders below speaker

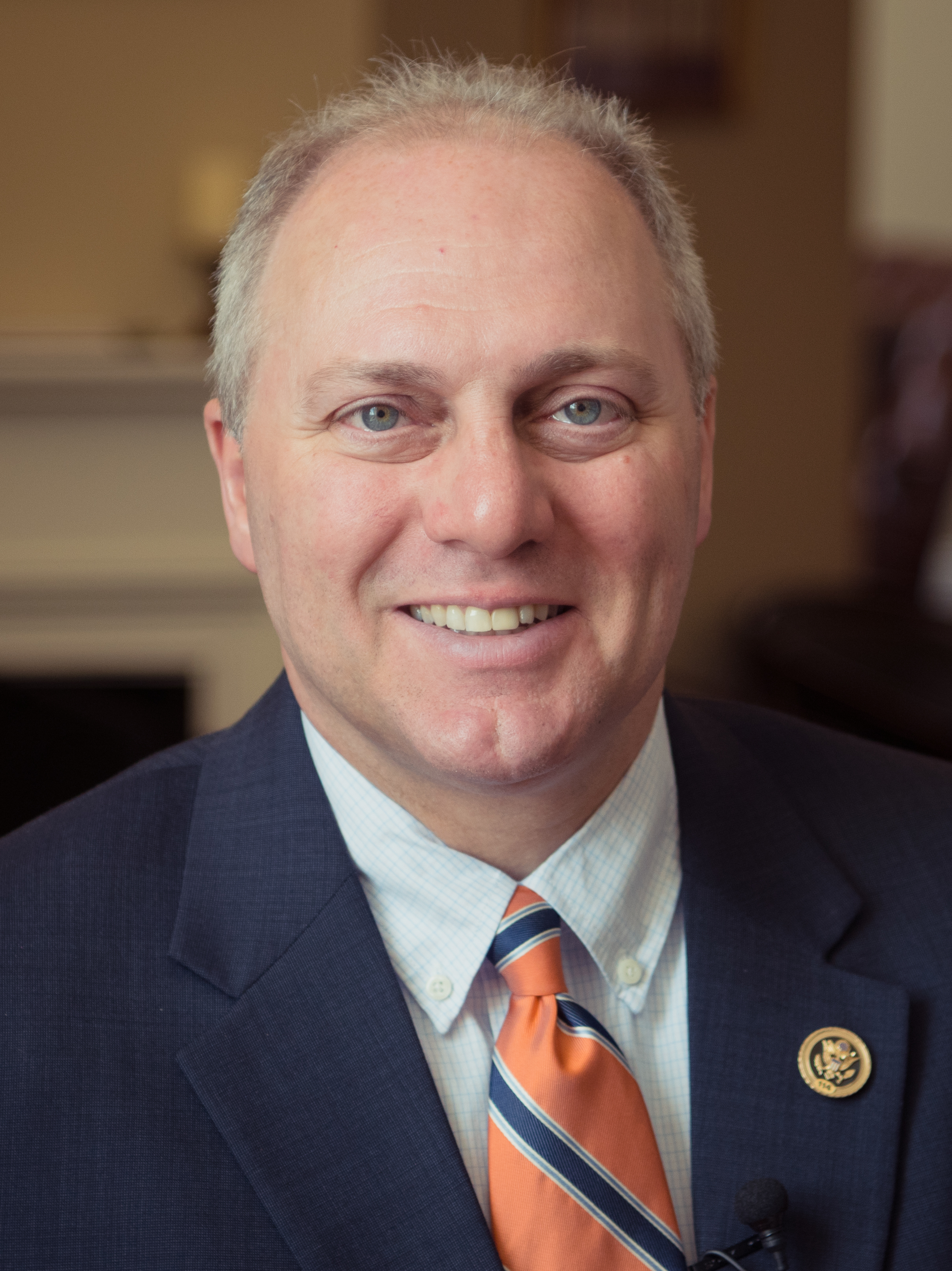
Majority Leader
Steve Scalise (R-LA)

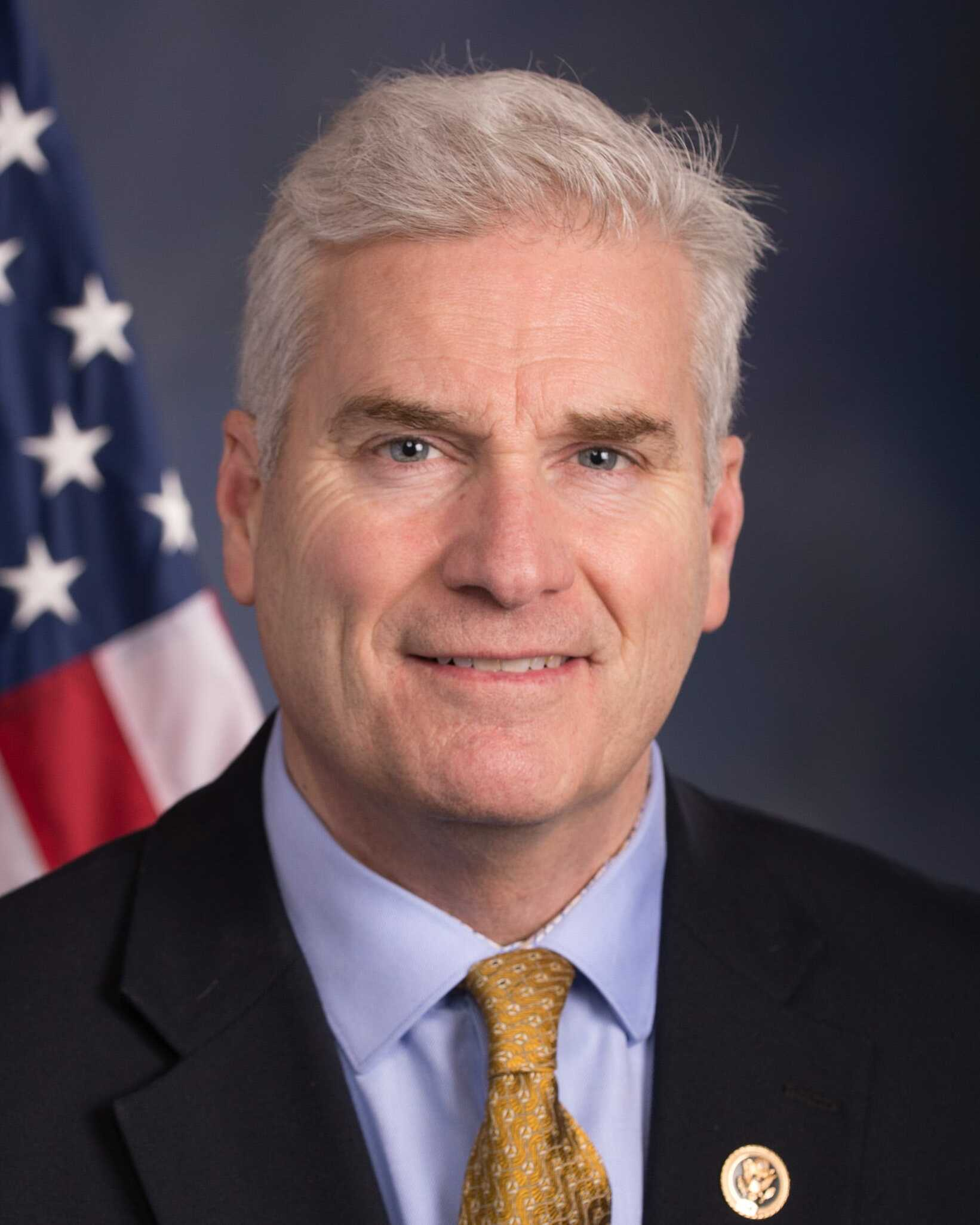
Majority Whip
Tom Emmer (R-MN)

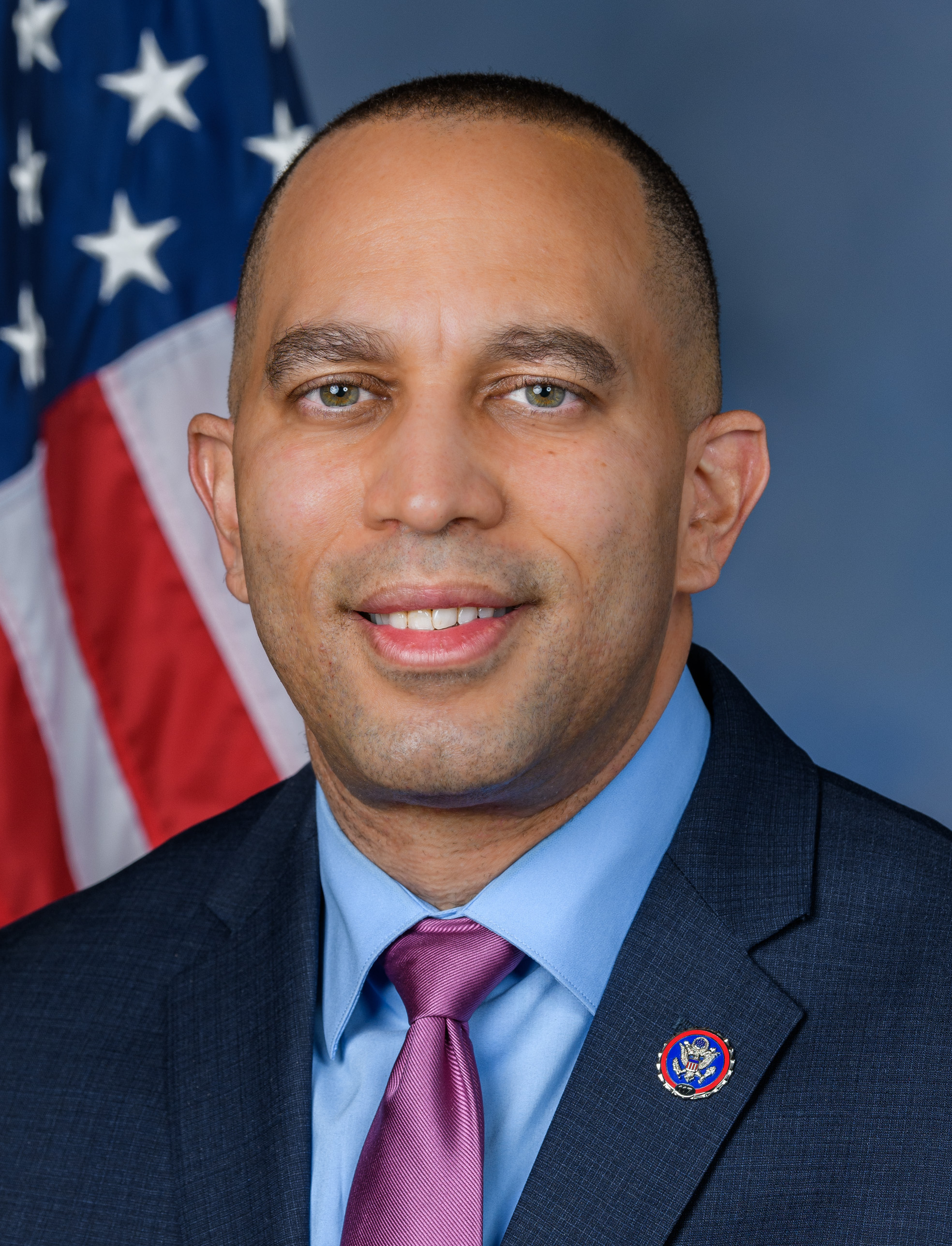
Minority Leader
Hakeem Jeffries (D-NY)

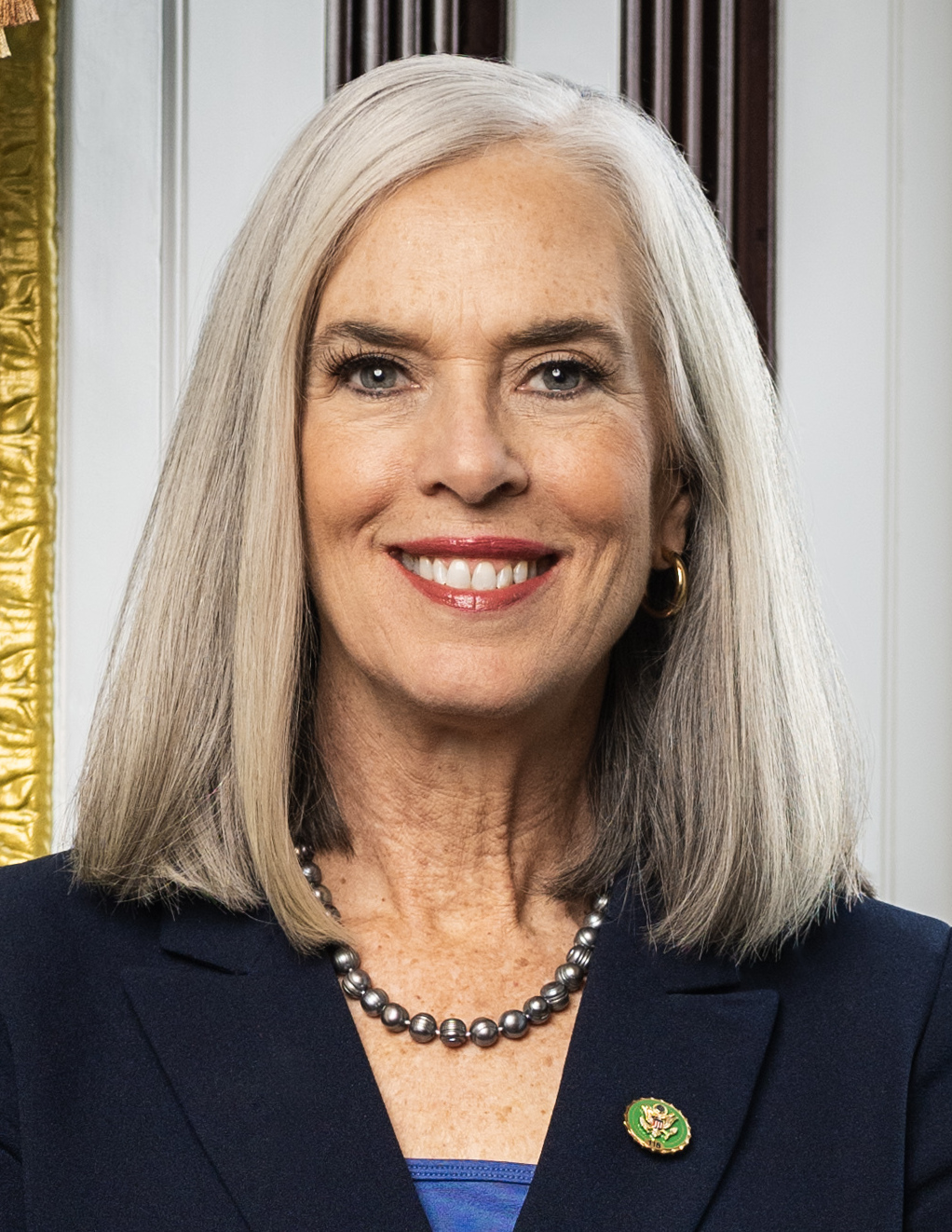
Minority Whip
Katherine Clark (D-MA)

Party leaders of the U.S. House of Representatives

Party leaders of the United States House of Representatives, also known as floor leaders, are congresspeople who coordinate legislative initiatives and serve as the chief spokespersons for their parties on the House floor. These leaders are elected every two years in secret balloting of their party caucuses or conferences: the House Democratic Caucus and the House Republican Conference. Depending on which party is in power, one party leader serves as majority leader and the other as minority leader.

Unlike the Senate majority leader, the House majority leader is the second highest-ranking member of their party's House caucus, behind the speaker of the House. The majority leader is responsible for setting the annual legislative agenda, scheduling legislation for consideration, and coordinating committee activity. The minority leader serves as floor leader of the opposition party, and is the minority counterpart to the speaker. The minority leader also speaks for the minority party in the House and its policies, and works to protect the minority party's rights.

The assistant majority leader and assistant minority leader of the House, commonly called whips, are the second-ranking members of each party's leadership. The main function of the majority and minority whips is to gather votes of their respective parties on major issues.

With the Republicans holding a majority of seats and the Democrats holding a minority, the current leaders are Majority Leader Steve Scalise of Louisiana and Majority Whip Tom Emmer of Minnesota, Minority Leader Hakeem Jeffries of New York, and Minority Whip Katherine Clark of Massachusetts.

== Selection ==
The floor leaders and whips of each party are elected by their respective parties in a closed-door caucus by secret ballot. The speaker-presumptive is assumed to be the incoming speaker, although not formally selected to be nominated for Speaker by the majority party's caucus. After this period, the speaker-designate is also chosen in a closed-door session by the largest caucus although the speaker is formally elevated to the position by a public vote of the entire House when Congress reconvenes.

Like the speaker of the House, the minority leaders are typically experienced lawmakers when they win election to this position. When Nancy Pelosi, D-CA, became minority leader in the 108th Congress, she had served in the House nearly 20 years and had served as minority whip in the 107th Congress. When her predecessor, Dick Gephardt, D-MO, became minority leader in the 104th House, he had been in the House for almost 20 years, had served as chairman of the Democratic Caucus for four years, had been a 1988 presidential candidate, and had been majority leader from June 1989 until Republicans captured control of the House in the November 1994 elections. Gephardt's predecessor in the minority leadership position was Robert Michel, R-IL, who became GOP Leader in 1981 after spending 24 years in the House. Michel's predecessor, Republican John Rhodes of Arizona, was elected minority leader in 1973 after 20 years of House service.

By contrast, party leaders of the United States Senate have often ascended to their position despite relatively few years of experience in that chamber, such as Lyndon B. Johnson, William Knowland, Tom Daschle, and Bill Frist.

== History ==
Before 1899, the majority party floor leader had traditionally been the chairman of the House Ways and Means Committee, the most powerful committee in the House, as it generates the bills of revenue specified in the Constitution as the House's unique power. However, this designation (begun under Speaker Henry Clay during the 12th United States Congress) was informal, and after 1865, alternated between the Ways and Means Committee Chair and the House Appropriations Committee Chair after the latter committee was split from the former. By at least 1850, the Senate and House Republican Conferences and the Senate and House Democratic Caucuses began naming chairs (although conference and caucus chairs carried very little authority).

The office of majority leader was created in 1899 and first occupied by Sereno Payne. Speaker David B. Henderson created the position to establish a party leader on the House floor separate from the speaker, as the role of speaker had become more prominent and the size of the House had grown from 105 at the beginning of the century to 356.

Starting with Republican Nicholas Longworth in 1925 and continuing until 1995, all majority leaders have directly ascended to the speakership after the incumbent surrenders the position. The only exceptions during this period were Charles A. Halleck, who served as majority leader from 1947–1949 and again from 1953–1955 and did not become Speaker because his party lost the House in the 1948 and 1954 House elections, respectively, and would not regain the House until 1994 (Halleck had been dead for years at this point); Hale Boggs, who served as majority leader from 1971–1973, died in a plane crash; and Dick Gephardt, who served as majority leader from 1989–1995, descended to minority leader since his party lost control in the 1994 midterm elections.

Since 1995, the only two majority leaders to become speaker are John Boehner and Kevin McCarthy, though indirectly as their party lost control in the 2006 and 2018 midterm elections. Boehner subsequently served as House minority leader from 2007 to 2011, and McCarthy served from 2019 to 2023. Both were elected Speaker when the House reconvened after gaining a majority in their respective midterm elections. In 1998, when Speaker Newt Gingrich announced his resignation, neither Majority Leader Dick Armey nor Majority Whip Tom DeLay contested the speakership, which eventually went to Chief Deputy Whip Dennis Hastert.

Traditionally, the Speaker is viewed as the leader of the majority party in the House, with the majority leader as second-in-command. For example, when the Republicans gained the majority in the House after the 2010 elections, Boehner ascended to the speakership while Eric Cantor succeeded Boehner as majority leader. Cantor was understood to be the second-ranking Republican in the House since Boehner was the indisputable leader of the House Republicans. However, there have been some exceptions. The most recent exception to this rule came when Majority Leader Tom DeLay was considered more prominent than Speaker Dennis Hastert from 2003 to 2006.

In contrast, the minority leader is the undisputed leader of the minority party. For example, when the Republicans lost their majority in the 2018 elections, McCarthy was elected as minority leader and hence replaced Ryan as the highest-ranking House Republican.

When the presidency and both houses of Congress are controlled by one party, the speaker normally takes a low profile and defers to the president. For that situation, the House minority leader can play the role of a de facto "leader of the opposition", often more so than the Senate minority leader, owing to the more partisan nature of the House and the greater role of leadership.

When the majority leader's party loses control of the House, and if the speaker and majority leader both remain in the leadership hierarchy, convention suggests that they would become the minority leader and minority whip, respectively. As the minority party has one less leadership position after losing the speaker's chair, there may be a contest for the remaining leadership positions. Nancy Pelosi is the most recent example of an outgoing speaker seeking the minority leader post to retain the House party leadership, as the Democrats lost control of the House in the 2010 elections. She ran successfully for minority leader in the 112th Congress.

In 2014, Eric Cantor became the first House majority leader to lose a primary election. Following his primary defeat, Cantor announced his resignation as majority leader, effective July 31, 2014, and he subsequently resigned his seat in Congress.

== Majority leader ==
The House majority leader's duties vary, depending upon the political makeup of the majority caucus. In several recent sessions of Congress, with the notable exception of the Pelosi speakership, the majority leader has been primarily responsible for scheduling the House floor's legislative calendar and direct management for all House committees.

One statutory duty, per 19 U.S.C. § 2191(c)(1), stipulates that an implementing bill submitted by the president of the United States for a fast-track negotiating authority (trade promotion authority) trade agreement must be introduced (by request) in the House by the House majority leader or a designee.

== Minority leader ==
=== Responsibilities ===
From an institutional perspective, the rules of the House assign a number of specific responsibilities to the minority leader. For example, Rule XII, clause 6, grant the minority leader (or their designee) the right to offer a motion to recommit with instructions; Rule II, clause 6, states the inspector general shall be appointed by joint recommendation of the speaker, majority leader, and minority leader; and Rule XV, clause 6, provides that the speaker, after consultation with the minority leader, may place legislation on the Corrections Calendar. The minority leader also has other institutional duties, such as appointing individuals to certain federal entities.

From a party perspective, the minority leader has a wide range of partisan assignments, all geared toward retaking majority control of the House. Five principal party activities direct the work of the minority leader.

1. The minority leader provides campaign assistance to political party incumbents and challengers.
2. The minority leader devises strategies, in consultation with other partisan colleagues, that advance party objectives. For example, by stalling action on the majority party's agenda, the minority leader may be able to launch a campaign against a "do-nothing Congress".
3. The minority leader works to promote and publicize the party's agenda.
4. The minority leader, if their party controls the White House, confers regularly with the President and the President's aides about issues before Congress, the Administration's agenda, and political events generally.
5. The minority leader strives to promote party harmony so as to maximize the chances for legislative and political success.

The roles and responsibilities of the minority leader are not well-defined. To a large extent, the functions of the minority leader are defined by tradition and custom. A minority leader from 1931 to 1939, Representative Bertrand Snell, R-N.Y., provided this "job description": "He is spokesman for his party and enunciates its policies. He is required to be alert and vigilant in defense of the minority's rights. It is his function and duty to criticize constructively the policies and programs of the majority, and to this end employ parliamentary tactics and give close attention to all proposed legislation."

Since Snell's description, other responsibilities have been added to the job. These duties involve an array of institutional and party functions. Before examining the institutional and party assignments of the minority leader, it is worth highlighting the historical origin of this position.

=== Origin of the post ===
To a large extent, the minority leader's position is a 20th-century innovation. Prior to this time congressional parties were often relatively disorganized, so it was not always evident who functioned as the opposition floor leader. Decades went by before anything like the modern two-party congressional system emerged on Capitol Hill with official titles for those who were its official leaders. However, from the earliest days of Congress, various House members intermittently assumed the role of "opposition leader". Some scholars suggest that Representative James Madison of Virginia informally functioned as the first "minority leader" because in the First Congress he led the opposition to Treasury Secretary Alexander Hamilton's fiscal policies.

During this early period, it was more usual that neither major party grouping (Federalists and Democratic-Republicans) had an official leader. In 1813, for instance, a scholar recounts that the Federalist minority of 36 Members needed a committee of 13 "to represent a party comprising a distinct minority" and "to coordinate the actions of men who were already partisans in the same cause." In 1828, a foreign observer of the House offered this perspective on the absence of formal party leadership on Capitol Hill:

I found there were absolutely no persons holding the stations of what are called, in England, Leaders, on either side of the House.... It is true, that certain members do take charge of administration questions, and certain others of opposition questions; but all this so obviously without concert among themselves, actual or tacit, that nothing can be conceived less systematic or more completely desultory, disjointed.

Internal party disunity compounded the difficulty of identifying lawmakers who might have informally functioned as a minority leader. For instance, "seven of the fourteen speakership elections from 1834 through 1859 had at least twenty different candidates in the field. Thirty-six competed in 1839, ninety-seven in 1849, ninety-one in 1859, and 138 in 1855." With so many candidates competing for the speakership, it is not at all clear that one of the defeated lawmakers then assumed the mantle of "minority leader". The Democratic minority from 1861 to 1875 was so completely disorganized that they did not "nominate a candidate for Speaker in two of these seven Congresses and nominated no man more than once in the other five. The defeated candidates were not automatically looked to for leadership."

In the judgment of political scientist Randall Ripley, since 1883 "the candidate for Speaker nominated by the minority party has clearly been the Minority Leader." However, this assertion is subject to dispute. On December 3, 1883, the House elected Democrat John G. Carlisle of Kentucky as Speaker. Republicans placed in nomination for the speakership J. Warren Keifer of Ohio, who was Speaker the previous Congress. Clearly, Keifer was not the Republicans' minority leader. He was a discredited leader in part because as Speaker he arbitrarily handed out "choice jobs to close relatives ... all at handsome salaries." Keifer received "the empty honor of the minority nomination. But with it came a sting -- for while this naturally involves the floor leadership, he was deserted by his [partisan] associates and his career as a national figure terminated ingloriously." Representative Thomas Reed, R-ME, who later became Speaker, assumed the de facto role of minority floor leader in Keifer's stead. "[A]lthough Keifer was the minority's candidate for Speaker, Reed became its acknowledged leader, and ever after, so long as he served in the House, remained the most conspicuous member of his party.

Another scholar contends that the minority leader position emerged even before 1883. On the Democratic side, "there were serious caucus fights for the minority speakership nomination in 1871 and 1873," indicating that the "nomination carried with it some vestige of leadership." Further, when Republicans were in the minority, the party nominated for Speaker a series of prominent lawmakers, including ex-Speaker James Blaine of Maine in 1875, former Appropriations Chairman James A. Garfield of Ohio, in 1876, 1877, and 1879, and ex-Speaker Keifer in 1883. "It is hard to believe that House partisans would place a man in the speakership when in the majority, and nominate him for this office when in the minority, and not look to him for legislative guidance." This was not the case, according to some observers, with respect to ex-Speaker Keifer.

In brief, there is disagreement among historical analysts as to the exact time period when the minority leadership emerged officially as a party position. Nonetheless, it seems safe to conclude that the position emerged during the latter part of the 19th century, a period of strong party organization and professional politicians. This era was "marked by strong partisan attachments, resilient patronage-based party organizations, and...high levels of party voting in Congress." Plainly, these were conditions conducive to the establishment of a more highly differentiated House leadership structure.

==== Minority party nominees for Speaker, 1865–1897 ====
While the Office of the House Historian only lists Minority Leaders starting in 1899, the minority's nominees for Speaker (at the beginning of each Congress) may be considered their party's leaders before that time.

- 1865: James Brooks (D-NY)
- 1867: Samuel S. Marshall (D-IL)
- 1869: Michael C. Kerr (D-IN)
- 1871: George W. Morgan (D-OH)
- 1873: Fernando Wood (D-NY)
- 1875: James Gillespie Blaine (R-ME)
- 1877, 1879: James Abram Garfield (R-OH)
- 1881: Samuel Jackson Randall (D-PA)
- 1883: Joseph Warren Keifer (R-OH)
- 1885, 1887: Thomas Brackett Reed (R-ME)
- 1889: John Griffin Carlisle (D-KY)
- 1891, 1893: Thomas Brackett Reed (R-ME)
- 1895: Charles F. Crisp (D-GA)
- 1897: Joseph W. Bailey (D-TX)

==== Trends ====
Two other points of historical interest merit brief mention. First, until the 61st Congress (1909–1910), "it was the custom to have the minority leader also serve as the ranking minority member on the two most powerful committees, Rules and Ways and Means." Today, the minority leader no longer serves on these committees; however, they appoint the minority members of the Rules Committee and influence the assignment of partisan colleagues to the Ways and Means Committee.

Second, Democrats have always elevated their minority floor leader to the speakership upon reclaiming majority status. Republicans have not always followed this leadership succession pattern. In 1919, for instance, Republicans bypassed James R. Mann, R-IL, who had been minority leader for eight years, and elected Frederick Gillett, R-MA, to be Speaker. Mann "had angered many Republicans by objecting to their private bills on the floor;" also he was a protégé of autocratic Speaker Joseph Cannon, R-IL (1903–1911), and many Members "suspected that he would try to re-centralize power in his hands if elected Speaker." More recently, although Robert H. Michel was the Minority Leader in 1994 when the Republicans regained control of the House in the 1994 midterm elections, he had already announced his retirement and had little or no involvement in the campaign, including the Contract with America which was unveiled six weeks before voting day.

In the instance when the presidency and both houses of Congress are controlled by one party, the Speaker normally assumes a lower profile and defers to the President. For that situation the House Minority Leader can play the role of a de facto "leader of the opposition", often more so than the Senate Minority Leader, due to the more partisan nature of the House and the greater role of leadership. Minority Leaders who have played prominent roles in opposing the incumbent president have included Gerald Ford, Richard Gephardt, Nancy Pelosi, and John Boehner.

=== Institutional functions ===
The style and role of any minority leader is influenced by a variety of elements, including personality and contextual factors, such as the size and cohesion of the minority party, whether their party controls the White House, the general political climate in the House, and the controversy that is sometimes associated with the legislative agenda. Despite the variability of these factors, there are a number of institutional obligations associated with this position. Many of these assignments or roles are spelled out in the House rule book. Others have devolved upon the position in other ways. To be sure, the minority leader is provided with extra staff resources—beyond those accorded him or her as a Representative—to assist in carrying out diverse leadership functions. Worth emphasis is that there are limits on the institutional role of the minority leader, because the majority party exercises disproportionate influence over the agenda, partisan ratios on committees, staff resources, administrative operations, and the day-to-day schedule and management of floor activities.

Under the rules of the House, the minority leader has certain roles and responsibilities. They include the following:

Drug Testing. Under Rule I, clause 9, the "Speaker, in consultation with the Minority Leader, shall develop through an appropriate entity of the House a system for drug testing in the House."

Inspector General. Rule II, clause 6, states that the "Inspector General shall be appointed for a Congress by the Speaker, the Majority Leader, and the Minority Leader, acting jointly." This rule further states that the minority leader and other specified House leaders shall be notified of any financial irregularity involving the House and receive audit reports of the inspector general.

Questions of Privilege. Under Rule IX, clause 2, a resolution "offered as a question of privilege by the Majority Leader or the Minority Leader ... shall have precedence of all other questions except motions to adjourn." This rule further references the minority leader with respect to the division of time for debate of these resolutions.

Oversight Plans. Under Rule X, clause 2, not later "than March 31 in the first session of a Congress, after consultation with the Speaker, the Majority Leader, and the Minority Leader, the Committee on Government Reform shall report to the House the oversight plans" of the standing committees along with any recommendations it or the House leaders have proposed to ensure the effective coordination of committees' oversight plans.

Committee on Standards of Official Conduct: Investigative Subcommittees. Rule X, clause 5, stipulates: "At the beginning of a Congress, the Speaker or his designee and the Minority Leader or his designee each shall appoint 10 Members, Delegates, or Resident Commissioners from his respective party who are not members of the Committee on Standards of Official Conduct to be available to serve on investigative subcommittees of that committee during that Congress."

Permanent Select Committee on Intelligence. "The Speaker and Minority Leader shall be ex officio members of the select committee but shall have no vote in the select committee and may not be counted for purposes of determining a quorum." In addition, each leader may designate a member of his leadership staff to assist him with his ex officio duties. (Rule X, clause 11).

Motion to Recommit with Instructions. Under Rule XIII, clause 6, the Rules Committee may not (except in certain specified circumstances) issue a "rule" that prevents the minority leader or a designee from offering a motion to recommit with instructions.

In addition, the minority leader has a number of other institutional functions. For instance, the minority leader is sometimes statutorily authorized to appoint individuals to certain federal entities; they and the majority leader each name three Members to serve as Private Calendar objectors; they are consulted with respect to reconvening the House per the usual formulation of conditional concurrent adjournment resolutions; they are a traditional member of the House Office Building Commission; they are a member of the United States Capitol Preservation Commission; and they may, after consultation with the speaker, convene an early organizational party caucus or conference. Informally, the minority leader maintains ties with majority party leaders to learn about the schedule and other House matters and forges agreements or understandings with them insofar as feasible.

=== Party functions ===
The minority leader has a number of formal and informal party responsibilities. Formally, the rules of each party specify certain roles and responsibilities for their leader. For example, under Democratic rules for the 106th Congress, the minority leader may call meetings of the Democratic Caucus. They are a member of the Democratic Congressional Campaign Committee; names the members of the Democratic Leadership Council; chairs the Policy Committee; and heads the Steering Committee. Examples of other assignments are making "recommendations to the Speaker on all Democratic Members who shall serve as conferees" and nominating party members to the Committees on Rules and House Administration. Republican rules identify generally comparable functions for their top party leader.

Informally, the minority leader has a wide range of party assignments. Lewis Deschler, the late House Parliamentarian (1928–1974), summarized the diverse duties of a party's floor leader:

A party's floor leader, in conjunction with other party leaders, plays an influential role in the formulation of party policy and programs. They are instrumental in guiding legislation favored by his party through the House, or in resisting those programs of the other party that are considered undesirable by his own party. They are instrumental in devising and implementing his party's strategy on the floor with respect to promoting or opposing legislation. They are kept constantly informed as to the status of legislative business and as to the sentiment of his party respecting particular legislation under consideration. Such information is derived in part from the floor leader's contacts with his party's members serving on House committees, and with the members of the party's whip organization.

These and several other party roles merit further mention because they influence significantly the leader's overarching objective: retake majority control of the House. "I want to get [my] members elected and win more seats," said Minority Leader Richard Gephardt, D-MO. "That's what [my partisan colleagues] want to do, and that's what they want me to do."

Five activities illustrate how minority leaders seek to accomplish this primary goal.

Provide Campaign Assistance. Minority leaders are typically energetic and aggressive campaigners for partisan incumbents and challengers. There is hardly any major aspect of campaigning that does not engage their attention. For example, they assist in recruiting qualified candidates; they establish "leadership PACs" to raise and distribute funds to House candidates of their party; they try to persuade partisan colleagues not to retire or run for other offices so as to hold down the number of open seats the party would need to defend; they coordinate their campaign activities with congressional and national party campaign committees; they encourage outside groups to back their candidates; they travel around the country to speak on behalf of party candidates; and they encourage incumbent colleagues to make significant financial contributions to the party's campaign committee. "The amount of time that [Minority Leader] Gephardt is putting in to help the DCCC [Democratic Congressional Campaign Committee] is unheard of," noted a Democratic lobbyist."No DCCC chairman has ever had that kind of support."

Devise Minority Party Strategies. The minority leader, in consultation with other party colleagues, has a range of strategic options that they can employ to advance minority party objectives. The options selected depend on a wide range of circumstances, such as the visibility or significance of the issue and the degree of cohesion within the majority party. For instance, a majority party riven by internal dissension, as occurred during the early 1900s when Progressive and "regular" Republicans were at loggerheads, may provide the minority leader with greater opportunities to achieve their priorities than if the majority party exhibited high degrees of party cohesion. Among the variable strategies available to the minority party, which can vary from bill to bill and be used in combination or at different stages of the lawmaking process, are the following:

Cooperation. The minority party supports and cooperates with the majority party in building winning coalitions on the floor.

Inconsequential Opposition. The minority party offers opposition, but it is of marginal significance, typically because the minority is so small.

Withdrawal. The minority party chooses not to take a position on an issue, perhaps because of intraparty divisions.

Innovation. The minority party develops alternatives and agendas of its own and attempts to construct winning coalitions on their behalf.

Partisan Opposition. The minority party offers strong opposition to majority party initiatives but does not counter with policy alternatives of their own.

Constructive Opposition. The minority party opposes initiatives of the majority party and offers its own proposals as substitutes.

Participation. The minority party is in the position of having to consider the views and proposals of their president and to assess their majority-building role with respect to his priorities. (Note: These strategic options have been modified to a degree and come from Jones, The Minority Party in Congress, p. 20.)

A look at one minority leadership strategy—partisan opposition—may suggest why it might be employed in specific circumstances. The purposes of obstruction are several, such as frustrating the majority party's ability to govern or attracting press and media attention to the alleged ineffectiveness of the majority party. "We know how to delay", remarked Minority Leader Gephardt. Dilatory motions to adjourn, appeals of the presiding officer's ruling, or numerous requests for roll call votes are standard time-consuming parliamentary tactics. By stalling action on the majority party's agenda, the minority leader may be able to launch a campaign against a "do-nothing Congress" and convince enough voters to put his party back in charge of the House. To be sure, the minority leader recognizes that "going negative" carries risks and may not be a winning strategy if his party fails to offer policy alternatives that appeal to broad segments of the general public.

Promote and Publicize the Party's Agenda. An important aim of the minority leader is to develop an electorally attractive agenda of ideas and proposals that unites their own House members and that energizes and appeals to core electoral supporters as well as independents and swing voters. Despite the minority leader's restricted ability to set the House's agenda, there are still opportunities for him to raise minority priorities. For example, the minority leader may employ, or threaten to use, discharge petitions to try to bring minority priorities to the floor. If they are able to attract the required 218 signatures on a discharge petition by attracting majority party supporters, they can force minority initiatives to the floor over the opposition of the majority leadership. As a GOP minority leader once said, the challenges he confronted are to "keep our people together, and to look for votes on the other side."

Minority leaders may engage in numerous activities to publicize their party's priorities and to criticize the opposition's. For instance, to keep their party colleagues "on message", they insure that partisan colleagues are sent packets of suggested press releases or "talking points" for constituent meetings in their districts; they help to organize "town meetings" in Members' districts around the country to publicize the party's agenda or a specific priority, such as health care or education; they sponsor party "retreats" to discuss issues and assess the party's public image; they create "theme teams" to craft party messages that might be raised during the one-minute, morning hour, or special order period in the House; they conduct surveys of party colleagues to discern their policy preferences; they establish websites that highlight and distribute party images and issues to users; and they organize task forces or issue teams to formulate party programs and to develop strategies for communicating these programs to the public.

House minority leaders also hold joint news conferences and consult with their counterparts in the Senate—and with the president if their party controls the White House. The overall objectives are to develop a coordinated communications strategy, to share ideas and information, and to present a united front on issues. Minority leaders also make floor speeches and close debate on major issues before the House; they deliver addresses in diverse forums across the country, and they write books or articles that highlight minority party goals and achievements. They must also be prepared "to debate on the floor, ad lib, no notes, on a moment's notice," remarked Minority Leader Michel. In brief, minority leaders are key strategists in developing and promoting the party's agenda and in outlining ways to neutralize the opposition's arguments and proposals.

Confer With the White House. If their party controls the White House, the minority leader confers regularly with the President and his aides about issues before Congress, the Administration's agenda, and political events generally. Strategically, the role of the minority leader will vary depending on whether the President is of the same party or the other party. In general, minority leaders will often work to advance the goals and aspirations of their party's president in Congress. When Robert Michel, R-IL, was minority leader (1981–1995), he typically functioned as the "point man" for Republican presidents. President Ronald Reagan's 1981 policy successes in the Democratic-controlled House was due in no small measure to Minority Leader Michel's effectiveness in wooing so-called "Reagan Democrats" to support, for instance, the Administration's landmark budget reconciliation bill. There are occasions, of course, when minority leaders will fault the legislative initiatives of their president. On an administration proposal that could adversely affect his district, Michel stated that he might "abdicate my leadership role [on this issue] since I can't harmonize my own views with the administration's." Minority Leader Gephardt, as another example, has publicly opposed a number of President Clinton's legislative initiatives from "fast track" trade authority to various budget issues.

When the White House is controlled by the House majority party, then the House minority leader assumes a larger role in formulating alternatives to executive branch initiatives and in acting as a national spokesperson for their party. "As Minority Leader during [President Lyndon Johnson's] Democratic administration, my responsibility has been to propose Republican alternatives," said Minority Leader Gerald Ford, R-MI. Greatly outnumbered in the House, Minority Leader Ford devised a political strategy that allowed Republicans to offer their alternatives in a manner that provided them political protection. As Ford explained:

"We used a technique of laying our program out in general debate," he said. When we got to the amendment phase, we would offer our program as a substitute for the Johnson proposal. If we lost in the Committee of the Whole, then we would usually offer it as a motion to recommit and get a vote on that. And if we lost on the motion to recommit, our Republican members had a choice: They could vote against the Johnson program and say we did our best to come up with a better alternative. Or they could vote for it and make the same argument. Usually we lost; but when you're only 140 out of 435, you don't expect to win many.

Ford also teamed with Senate minority leader Everett Dirksen, R-IL, to act as national spokesmen for their party. They met with the press every Thursday following the weekly joint leadership meeting. Ford's predecessor as minority leader, Charles A. Halleck, R-IN, probably received more visibility in this role, because the press and media dubbed it the "Ev and Charlie Show". In fact, the "Republican National Committee budgeted $30,000 annually to produce the weekly news conference."

Foster Party Harmony. Minority status, by itself, is often an important inducement for minority party members to stay together, to accommodate different interests, and to submerge intraparty factional disagreements. To hold a diverse membership together often requires extensive consultations and discussions with rank-and-file Members and with different factional groupings. As Minority Leader Gephardt said:

We have weekly caucus meetings. We have daily leadership meetings. We have weekly ranking Member meetings. We have party effectiveness meetings. There's a lot more communication. I believe leadership is bottom up, not top down. I think you have to build policy and strategy and vision from the bottom up, and involve people in figuring out what that is.

Gephardt added that "inclusion and empowerment of the people on the line have to be done to get the best performance" from the minority party. Other techniques for fostering party harmony include the appointment of task forces composed of partisan colleagues with conflicting views to reach consensus on issues; the creation of new leadership positions as a way to reach out and involve a greater diversity of partisans in the leadership structure; and daily meetings in the Leader's office (or at breakfast, lunch, or dinner) to lay out floor strategy or political objectives for the minority party.

== Whips ==
A whip manages their party's legislative program on the House floor. The whip keeps track of all legislation and ensures that all party members are present when important measures are to be voted upon.

The majority whip is an elected member of the majority party who assists the speaker of the House and the majority leader to coordinate ideas on, and garner support for, proposed legislation. They are reckoned as the third-ranking member of their party behind the speaker and the majority leader.

The minority whip is a member of the minority party who assists the minority leader in coordinating the party caucus in its responses to legislation and other matters. They are reckoned as the second most powerful member of their party, behind the minority leader.

== List of party leaders and whips ==
The majority and president are included for historical and comparative reference.

Congress	Years	Democratic whip	Democratic leader	Speaker	Republican leader	Republican whip	U.S. president
56th	1899–1901	Oscar Underwood (Note: Sources differ on the dates that Underwood served as Whip: One indicates that he served from 1899 to 1901. See "Democratic Whips". Office of the Clerk, U.S. House of Representatives. Archived from the original on October 11, 2011.; Another indicates that he served only during 1901. See Heitshusen, Valerie (February 27, 2007). "Party Leaders in Congress, 1789-2007: Vital Statistics". Congressional Research Service. p. CRS–11.; According to a contemporary newspaper article, "Representative Underwood has been voluntarily filling that position [Democratic whip] since Congress convened" (December 4, 1899). See "Call for a Democratic Caucus". The New York Times. January 9, 1900. p. 8.) (Alabama)	James D. Richardson (Tennessee)	— GOP majority – David B. Henderson (Iowa)	Sereno E. Payne (New York)	James Albertus Tawney (Minnesota)	William McKinley (Republican)
57th	1901–1903	James Tilghman Lloyd (Missouri)	James D. Richardson (Tennessee)	— GOP majority – David B. Henderson (Iowa)	Sereno E. Payne (New York)	James Albertus Tawney (Minnesota)	Theodore Roosevelt (Republican)
58th	1903–1905	James Tilghman Lloyd (Missouri)	John Sharp Williams (Mississippi)	— GOP majority – Joe Cannon (Illinois)	Sereno E. Payne (New York)	James Albertus Tawney (Minnesota)	Theodore Roosevelt (Republican)
59th	1905–1907	James Tilghman Lloyd (Missouri)	John Sharp Williams (Mississippi)	— GOP majority – Joe Cannon (Illinois)	Sereno E. Payne (New York)	James E. Watson (Indiana)	Theodore Roosevelt (Republican)
60th	1907–1908	James Tilghman Lloyd (Missouri)	John Sharp Williams (Mississippi)	— GOP majority – Joe Cannon (Illinois)	Sereno E. Payne (New York)	James E. Watson (Indiana)	Theodore Roosevelt (Republican)
60th	1908–1909	James Tilghman Lloyd (Missouri)	John Sharp Williams (Mississippi)	— GOP majority – Joe Cannon (Illinois)	Sereno E. Payne (New York)	James E. Watson (Indiana)	Theodore Roosevelt (Republican)
61st	1909–1911	None	Champ Clark (Missouri)	— GOP majority – Joe Cannon (Illinois)	Sereno E. Payne (New York)	John W. Dwight (New York)	William Howard Taft (Republican)
62nd	1911–1913	None	Oscar Underwood (Alabama)	— Dem majority – Champ Clark (Missouri)	James Mann (Illinois)	John W. Dwight (New York)	William Howard Taft (Republican)
63rd	1913–1915	Thomas M. Bell (Georgia)	Oscar Underwood (Alabama)	— Dem majority – Champ Clark (Missouri)	James Mann (Illinois)	Charles H. Burke (South Dakota)	Woodrow Wilson (Democratic)
64th	1915–1917	None	Claude Kitchin (North Carolina)	— Dem majority – Champ Clark (Missouri)	James Mann (Illinois)	Charles M. Hamilton (New York)	Woodrow Wilson (Democratic)
65th	1917–1919	None	Claude Kitchin (North Carolina)	— Dem majority – Champ Clark (Missouri)	James Mann (Illinois)	Charles M. Hamilton (New York)	Woodrow Wilson (Democratic)
66th	1919–1921	None	Champ Clark (Missouri)	— GOP majority – Frederick H. Gillett (Massachusetts)	Frank W. Mondell (Wyoming)	Harold Knutson (Minnesota)	Woodrow Wilson (Democratic)
67th	1921–1923	William A. Oldfield (Arkansas)	Claude Kitchin (North Carolina)	— GOP majority – Frederick H. Gillett (Massachusetts)	Frank W. Mondell (Wyoming)	Harold Knutson (Minnesota)	Warren G. Harding (Republican)
68th	1923–1925	William A. Oldfield (Arkansas)	Finis J. Garrett (Tennessee)	— GOP majority – Frederick H. Gillett (Massachusetts)	Nicholas Longworth (Ohio)	Albert H. Vestal (Indiana)	Calvin Coolidge (Republican)
69th	1925–1927	William A. Oldfield (Arkansas)	Finis J. Garrett (Tennessee)	— GOP majority – Nicholas Longworth (Ohio)	John Q. Tilson (Connecticut)	Albert H. Vestal (Indiana)	Calvin Coolidge (Republican)
70th	1927–1929	William A. Oldfield (Arkansas)	Finis J. Garrett (Tennessee)	— GOP majority – Nicholas Longworth (Ohio)	John Q. Tilson (Connecticut)	Albert H. Vestal (Indiana)	Calvin Coolidge (Republican)
71st	1929–1931	John McDuffie (Alabama)	John Nance Garner (Texas)	— GOP majority – Nicholas Longworth (Ohio)	John Q. Tilson (Connecticut)	Albert H. Vestal (Indiana)	Herbert Hoover (Republican)
72nd	1931–1933	John McDuffie (Alabama)	Henry T. Rainey (Illinois)	— Dem majority – John Nance Garner (Texas)	Bertrand Snell (New York)	Carl G. Bachmann (West Virginia)	Herbert Hoover (Republican)
73rd	1933–1935	Arthur H. Greenwood (Indiana)	Jo Byrns (Tennessee)	— Dem majority – Henry T. Rainey (Illinois)	Bertrand Snell (New York)	Harry L. Englebright (California)	Franklin D. Roosevelt (Democratic)
74th	1935–1936	Patrick J. Boland (Pennsylvania)	William B. Bankhead (Alabama)	— Dem majority – Jo Byrns (Tennessee)	Bertrand Snell (New York)	Harry L. Englebright (California)	Franklin D. Roosevelt (Democratic)
74th	1936–1937	Patrick J. Boland (Pennsylvania)	Sam Rayburn (Texas)	— Dem majority – William B. Bankhead (Alabama)	Bertrand Snell (New York)	Harry L. Englebright (California)	Franklin D. Roosevelt (Democratic)
75th	1937–1939	Patrick J. Boland (Pennsylvania)	Sam Rayburn (Texas)	— Dem majority – William B. Bankhead (Alabama)	Bertrand Snell (New York)	Harry L. Englebright (California)	Franklin D. Roosevelt (Democratic)
76th	1939–1940	Patrick J. Boland (Pennsylvania)	Sam Rayburn (Texas)	— Dem majority – William B. Bankhead (Alabama)	Joseph W. Martin Jr. (Massachusetts)	Harry L. Englebright (California)	Franklin D. Roosevelt (Democratic)
76th	1940–1941	Patrick J. Boland (Pennsylvania)	John W. McCormack (Massachusetts)	— Dem majority – Sam Rayburn (Texas)	Joseph W. Martin Jr. (Massachusetts)	Harry L. Englebright (California)	Franklin D. Roosevelt (Democratic)
77th	1941–1942	Patrick J. Boland (Pennsylvania)	John W. McCormack (Massachusetts)	— Dem majority – Sam Rayburn (Texas)	Joseph W. Martin Jr. (Massachusetts)	Harry L. Englebright (California)	Franklin D. Roosevelt (Democratic)
77th	1942–1943	Robert Ramspeck (Georgia)	John W. McCormack (Massachusetts)	— Dem majority – Sam Rayburn (Texas)	Joseph W. Martin Jr. (Massachusetts)	Harry L. Englebright (California)	Franklin D. Roosevelt (Democratic)
78th	1943	Robert Ramspeck (Georgia)	John W. McCormack (Massachusetts)	— Dem majority – Sam Rayburn (Texas)	Joseph W. Martin Jr. (Massachusetts)	Harry L. Englebright (California)	Franklin D. Roosevelt (Democratic)
78th	1943–1945	Robert Ramspeck (Georgia)	John W. McCormack (Massachusetts)	— Dem majority – Sam Rayburn (Texas)	Joseph W. Martin Jr. (Massachusetts)	Leslie Arends (Illinois)	Franklin D. Roosevelt (Democratic)
79th	1945	Robert Ramspeck (Georgia)	John W. McCormack (Massachusetts)	— Dem majority – Sam Rayburn (Texas)	Joseph W. Martin Jr. (Massachusetts)	Leslie Arends (Illinois)	Harry S. Truman (Democratic)
79th	1946–1947	John Sparkman (Alabama)	John W. McCormack (Massachusetts)	— Dem majority – Sam Rayburn (Texas)	Joseph W. Martin Jr. (Massachusetts)	Leslie Arends (Illinois)	Harry S. Truman (Democratic)
80th	1947–1949	John W. McCormack (Massachusetts)	Sam Rayburn (Texas)	— GOP majority – Joseph W. Martin Jr. (Massachusetts)	Charles A. Halleck (Indiana)	Leslie Arends (Illinois)	Harry S. Truman (Democratic)
81st	1949–1951	Percy Priest (Tennessee)	John W. McCormack (Massachusetts)	— Dem majority – Sam Rayburn (Texas)	Joseph W. Martin Jr. (Massachusetts)	Leslie Arends (Illinois)	Harry S. Truman (Democratic)
82nd	1951–1953	Percy Priest (Tennessee)	John W. McCormack (Massachusetts)	— Dem majority – Sam Rayburn (Texas)	Joseph W. Martin Jr. (Massachusetts)	Leslie Arends (Illinois)	Harry S. Truman (Democratic)
83rd	1953–1955	John W. McCormack (Massachusetts)	Sam Rayburn (Texas)	— GOP majority – Joseph W. Martin Jr. (Massachusetts)	Charles A. Halleck (Indiana)	Leslie Arends (Illinois)	Dwight D. Eisenhower (Republican)
84th	1955–1957	Carl Albert (Oklahoma)	John W. McCormack (Massachusetts)	— Dem majority – Sam Rayburn (Texas)	Joseph W. Martin Jr. (Massachusetts)	Leslie Arends (Illinois)	Dwight D. Eisenhower (Republican)
85th	1957–1959	Carl Albert (Oklahoma)	John W. McCormack (Massachusetts)	— Dem majority – Sam Rayburn (Texas)	Joseph W. Martin Jr. (Massachusetts)	Leslie Arends (Illinois)	Dwight D. Eisenhower (Republican)
86th	1959–1961	Carl Albert (Oklahoma)	John W. McCormack (Massachusetts)	— Dem majority – Sam Rayburn (Texas)	Charles A. Halleck (Indiana)	Leslie Arends (Illinois)	Dwight D. Eisenhower (Republican)
87th	1961–1962	Carl Albert (Oklahoma)	John W. McCormack (Massachusetts)	— Dem majority – Sam Rayburn (Texas)	Charles A. Halleck (Indiana)	Leslie Arends (Illinois)	John F. Kennedy (Democratic)
87th	1962–1963	Hale Boggs (Louisiana)	Carl Albert (Oklahoma)	— Dem majority – John W. McCormack (Massachusetts)	Charles A. Halleck (Indiana)	Leslie Arends (Illinois)	John F. Kennedy (Democratic)
88th	1963–1965	Hale Boggs (Louisiana)	Carl Albert (Oklahoma)	— Dem majority – John W. McCormack (Massachusetts)	Charles A. Halleck (Indiana)	Leslie Arends (Illinois)	Lyndon B. Johnson (Democratic)
89th	1965–1967	Hale Boggs (Louisiana)	Carl Albert (Oklahoma)	— Dem majority – John W. McCormack (Massachusetts)	Gerald Ford (Michigan)	Leslie Arends (Illinois)	Lyndon B. Johnson (Democratic)
90th	1967–1969	Hale Boggs (Louisiana)	Carl Albert (Oklahoma)	— Dem majority – John W. McCormack (Massachusetts)	Gerald Ford (Michigan)	Leslie Arends (Illinois)	Lyndon B. Johnson (Democratic)
91st	1969–1971	Hale Boggs (Louisiana)	Carl Albert (Oklahoma)	— Dem majority – John W. McCormack (Massachusetts)	Gerald Ford (Michigan)	Leslie Arends (Illinois)	Richard Nixon (Republican)
92nd	1971–1973	Tip O'Neill (Massachusetts)	Hale Boggs (Louisiana)	— Dem majority – Carl Albert (Oklahoma)	Gerald Ford (Michigan)	Leslie Arends (Illinois)	Richard Nixon (Republican)
93rd	1973	John J. McFall (California)	Tip O'Neill (Massachusetts)	— Dem majority – Carl Albert (Oklahoma)	Gerald Ford (Michigan)	Leslie Arends (Illinois)	Richard Nixon (Republican)
93rd	1973–1975	John J. McFall (California)	Tip O'Neill (Massachusetts)	— Dem majority – Carl Albert (Oklahoma)	John Rhodes (Arizona)	Leslie Arends (Illinois)	Richard Nixon (Republican)
94th	1975–1977	John J. McFall (California)	Tip O'Neill (Massachusetts)	— Dem majority – Carl Albert (Oklahoma)	John Rhodes (Arizona)	Bob Michel (Illinois)	Gerald Ford (Republican)
95th	1977–1979	John Brademas (Indiana)	Jim Wright (Texas)	— Dem majority – Tip O'Neill (Massachusetts)	John Rhodes (Arizona)	Bob Michel (Illinois)	Jimmy Carter (Democratic)
96th	1979–1981	John Brademas (Indiana)	Jim Wright (Texas)	— Dem majority – Tip O'Neill (Massachusetts)	John Rhodes (Arizona)	Bob Michel (Illinois)	Jimmy Carter (Democratic)
97th	1981–1983	Tom Foley (Washington)	Jim Wright (Texas)	— Dem majority – Tip O'Neill (Massachusetts)	Bob Michel (Illinois)	Trent Lott (Mississippi)	Ronald Reagan (Republican)
98th	1983–1985	Tom Foley (Washington)	Jim Wright (Texas)	— Dem majority – Tip O'Neill (Massachusetts)	Bob Michel (Illinois)	Trent Lott (Mississippi)	Ronald Reagan (Republican)
99th	1985–1987	Tom Foley (Washington)	Jim Wright (Texas)	— Dem majority – Tip O'Neill (Massachusetts)	Bob Michel (Illinois)	Trent Lott (Mississippi)	Ronald Reagan (Republican)
100th	1987–1989	Tony Coelho (California)	Tom Foley (Washington)	— Dem majority – Jim Wright (Texas)	Bob Michel (Illinois)	Trent Lott (Mississippi)	Ronald Reagan (Republican)
101st	1989	Tony Coelho (California)	Tom Foley (Washington)	— Dem majority – Jim Wright (Texas)	Bob Michel (Illinois)	Dick Cheney (Wyoming)	George H. W. Bush (Republican)
101st	1989–1991	William H. Gray III (Pennsylvania)	Dick Gephardt (Missouri)	— Dem majority – Tom Foley (Washington)	Bob Michel (Illinois)	Newt Gingrich (Georgia)	George H. W. Bush (Republican)
102nd	1991	William H. Gray III (Pennsylvania)	Dick Gephardt (Missouri)	— Dem majority – Tom Foley (Washington)	Bob Michel (Illinois)	Newt Gingrich (Georgia)	George H. W. Bush (Republican)
102nd	1991–1993	David Bonior (Michigan)	Dick Gephardt (Missouri)	— Dem majority – Tom Foley (Washington)	Bob Michel (Illinois)	Newt Gingrich (Georgia)	George H. W. Bush (Republican)
103rd	1993–1995	David Bonior (Michigan)	Dick Gephardt (Missouri)	— Dem majority – Tom Foley (Washington)	Bob Michel (Illinois)	Newt Gingrich (Georgia)	Bill Clinton (Democratic)
104th	1995–1997	David Bonior (Michigan)	Dick Gephardt (Missouri)	— GOP majority – Newt Gingrich (Georgia)	Dick Armey (Texas)	Tom DeLay (Texas)	Bill Clinton (Democratic)
105th	1997–1999	David Bonior (Michigan)	Dick Gephardt (Missouri)	— GOP majority – Newt Gingrich (Georgia)	Dick Armey (Texas)	Tom DeLay (Texas)	Bill Clinton (Democratic)
106th	1999–2001	David Bonior (Michigan)	Dick Gephardt (Missouri)	— GOP majority – Dennis Hastert (Illinois)	Dick Armey (Texas)	Tom DeLay (Texas)	Bill Clinton (Democratic)
107th	2001–2002	David Bonior (Michigan)	Dick Gephardt (Missouri)	— GOP majority – Dennis Hastert (Illinois)	Dick Armey (Texas)	Tom DeLay (Texas)	George W. Bush (Republican)
107th	2002–2003	Nancy Pelosi (California)	Dick Gephardt (Missouri)	— GOP majority – Dennis Hastert (Illinois)	Dick Armey (Texas)	Tom DeLay (Texas)	George W. Bush (Republican)
108th	2003–2005	Steny Hoyer (Maryland)	Nancy Pelosi (California)	— GOP majority – Dennis Hastert (Illinois)	Tom DeLay (Texas)	Roy Blunt (Missouri)	George W. Bush (Republican)
109th	2005	Steny Hoyer (Maryland)	Nancy Pelosi (California)	— GOP majority – Dennis Hastert (Illinois)	Tom DeLay (Texas)	Roy Blunt (Missouri)	George W. Bush (Republican)
109th	2005–2006	Steny Hoyer (Maryland)	Nancy Pelosi (California)	— GOP majority – Dennis Hastert (Illinois)	Roy Blunt (Missouri, Acting)	Roy Blunt (Missouri)	George W. Bush (Republican)
109th	2006–2007	Steny Hoyer (Maryland)	Nancy Pelosi (California)	— GOP majority – Dennis Hastert (Illinois)	John Boehner (Ohio)	Roy Blunt (Missouri)	George W. Bush (Republican)
110th	2007–2009	Jim Clyburn (South Carolina)	Steny Hoyer (Maryland)	— Dem majority – Nancy Pelosi (California)	John Boehner (Ohio)	Roy Blunt (Missouri)	George W. Bush (Republican)
111th	2009–2011	Jim Clyburn (South Carolina)	Steny Hoyer (Maryland)	— Dem majority – Nancy Pelosi (California)	John Boehner (Ohio)	Eric Cantor (Virginia)	Barack Obama (Democratic)
112th	2011–2013	Steny Hoyer (Maryland)	Nancy Pelosi (California)	— GOP majority – John Boehner (Ohio)	Eric Cantor (Virginia)	Kevin McCarthy (California)	Barack Obama (Democratic)
113th	2013–2014	Steny Hoyer (Maryland)	Nancy Pelosi (California)	— GOP majority – John Boehner (Ohio)	Eric Cantor (Virginia)	Kevin McCarthy (California)	Barack Obama (Democratic)
113th	2014–2015	Steny Hoyer (Maryland)	Nancy Pelosi (California)	— GOP majority – John Boehner (Ohio)	Kevin McCarthy (California)	Steve Scalise (Louisiana)	Barack Obama (Democratic)
114th	2015	Steny Hoyer (Maryland)	Nancy Pelosi (California)	— GOP majority – John Boehner (Ohio)	Kevin McCarthy (California)	Steve Scalise (Louisiana)	Barack Obama (Democratic)
114th	2015–2017	Steny Hoyer (Maryland)	Nancy Pelosi (California)	— GOP majority – Paul Ryan (Wisconsin)	Kevin McCarthy (California)	Steve Scalise (Louisiana)	Barack Obama (Democratic)
115th	2017–2019	Steny Hoyer (Maryland)	Nancy Pelosi (California)	— GOP majority – Paul Ryan (Wisconsin)	Kevin McCarthy (California)	Steve Scalise (Louisiana)	Donald Trump (Republican)
116th	2019–2021	Jim Clyburn (South Carolina)	Steny Hoyer (Maryland)	— Dem majority – Nancy Pelosi (California)	Kevin McCarthy (California)	Steve Scalise (Louisiana)	Donald Trump (Republican)
117th	2021–2023	Jim Clyburn (South Carolina)	Steny Hoyer (Maryland)	— Dem majority – Nancy Pelosi (California)	Kevin McCarthy (California)	Steve Scalise (Louisiana)	Joe Biden (Democratic)
118th	2023	Katherine Clark (Massachusetts)	Hakeem Jeffries (New York)	— GOP majority – Kevin McCarthy (California)	Steve Scalise (Louisiana)	Tom Emmer (Minnesota)	Joe Biden (Democratic)
118th	2023–2025	Katherine Clark (Massachusetts)	Hakeem Jeffries (New York)	— GOP majority – Mike Johnson (Louisiana)	Steve Scalise (Louisiana)	Tom Emmer (Minnesota)	Joe Biden (Democratic)
119th	2025–present	Katherine Clark (Massachusetts)	Hakeem Jeffries (New York)	— GOP majority – Mike Johnson (Louisiana)	Steve Scalise (Louisiana)	Tom Emmer (Minnesota)	Donald Trump (Republican)
Cong ress	Years	Democratic whip	Democratic leader	Speaker	Republican leader	Republican whip	U.S. president

== Assistant party leaders and whips ==
=== Chief deputy whips ===
The chief deputy whip is the primary assistant to the whip, who is the chief vote counter for their party. The current chief deputy majority whip is Republican Guy Reschenthaler. Within the House Republican Conference, the chief deputy whip is the highest appointed position and often a launching pad for future positions in the House Leadership. Cantor and McCarthy, for instance, served as chief deputy Republican whips before ascending to the majority leader's post. The House Democratic Conference has multiple chief deputy whips, led by a senior chief deputy whip, which is the highest appointed position within the House Democratic Caucus. John Lewis held this post from 1991 until his death in 2020. Jan Schakowsky held the position of senior chief deputy majority whip along with Lewis since 2019, previously holding a position as chief deputy whip since 2005. Between 1955 and 1973, the Democrats simply had the title Deputy Whip.

==== List of Republican chief deputy whips ====
Congress	Officeholder	District	Term	Party whip	Speaker
97th	David F. Emery	ME-01	1981–1993	Trent Lott	Tip O'Neill — Dem majority –
98th	Tom Loeffler	TX-21	1983–1987	Trent Lott	Tip O'Neill — Dem majority –
99th	Tom Loeffler	TX-21	1983–1987	Trent Lott	Tip O'Neill — Dem majority –
100th	Edward Rell Madigan	IL-15	1987–1989	Trent Lott	Jim Wright (Note: Jim Wright resigned due to an federal investigation financial issues on June 6, 1989; he was succeeded by Majority Leader, Tom Foley the same day.); Tom Foley — Dem majority –
101st	Robert Smith Walker (Note: Steve Gunderson served alongside Robert Smith Walker from 1989–1993 during the 101st and 102nd Congresses.)	PA-16	1989–1995	Dick Cheney (Note: Cheney resigned on March 20, 1989, to become Secretary of Defense and was succeeded by Gingrich the same day.); Newt Gingrich	Jim Wright; Tom Foley — Dem majority –
101st	Robert Smith Walker	PA-16	1989–1995	Newt Gingrich	Tom Foley — Dem majority –
102nd	Robert Smith Walker	PA-16	1989–1995	Newt Gingrich	Tom Foley — Dem majority –
103rd	Robert Smith Walker	PA-16	1989–1995	Newt Gingrich	Tom Foley — Dem majority –
104th	Dennis Hastert	IL-14	1995–1999	Tom DeLay	Newt Gingrich — GOP majority —
105th	Dennis Hastert	IL-14	1995–1999	Tom DeLay	Newt Gingrich — GOP majority —
106th	Roy Blunt	MO-07	1999–2003	Tom DeLay	Dennis Hastert — GOP majority —
107th	Roy Blunt	MO-07	1999–2003	Tom DeLay	Dennis Hastert — GOP majority —
108th	Eric Cantor	VA-07	2003–2009	Roy Blunt	Dennis Hastert — GOP majority —
109th	Eric Cantor	VA-07	2003–2009	Roy Blunt	Dennis Hastert — GOP majority —
110th	Eric Cantor	VA-07	2003–2009	Roy Blunt	Nancy Pelosi — Dem majority –
111th	Kevin McCarthy	CA-22	2009–2011	Eric Cantor	Nancy Pelosi — Dem majority –
112th	Peter Roskam	IL-06	2011–2014	Kevin McCarthy	John Boehner — GOP majority —
113th (Note: On August 1, 2014, there was a Republican Leadership change after House Republican Majority Leader, Eric Cantor, lost his primary reelection bid. Kevin McCarthy succeeded Cantor as Majority Leader, Steve Scalise succeeded McCarthy as Majority Whip and Roskam was replaced by Patrick McHenry.)	Peter Roskam	IL-06	2011–2014	Kevin McCarthy	John Boehner — GOP majority —
113th	Patrick McHenry	NC-10	2014–2019	Steve Scalise	John Boehner — GOP majority —
114th	Patrick McHenry	NC-10	2014–2019	Steve Scalise	Paul Ryan — GOP majority —
115th	Patrick McHenry	NC-10	2014–2019	Steve Scalise	Paul Ryan — GOP majority —
116th	Drew Ferguson	GA-03	2019–2023	Steve Scalise	Nancy Pelosi — Dem majority –
117th	Drew Ferguson	GA-03	2019–2023	Steve Scalise	Nancy Pelosi — Dem majority –
118th	Guy Reschenthaler	PA-14	2023–present	Tom Emmer	Kevin McCarthy (Note: Elected House Speaker on January 7, 2023, after numerous votes and removed by a vote on October 3, 2023.)
118th	Guy Reschenthaler	PA-14	2023–present	Tom Emmer	Patrick McHenry (Note: Selected to serve as Speaker Pro Tempore from October 3 to October 25, 2023.)
118th	Guy Reschenthaler	PA-14	2023–present	Tom Emmer	Mike Johnson (Note: Elected 56th Speaker on October 25, 2023.) — GOP majority —
119th	Guy Reschenthaler	PA-14	2023–present	Tom Emmer	Mike Johnson — GOP majority —

==== List of Democratic senior chief deputy whips ====
Congress	Officeholder 1	District	Term	Officeholder 2	District	Term	Party whip	Speaker
108th	John Lewis	GA-05	2003–2020 (Note: Served in this role until his death on July 17, 2020.)	2nd position not established			Steny Hoyer	Dennis Hastert — GOP majority —
109th	John Lewis	GA-05	2003–2020	2nd position not established			Steny Hoyer	Dennis Hastert — GOP majority —
110th	John Lewis	GA-05	2003–2020	2nd position not established			Jim Clyburn	Nancy Pelosi — Dem majority –
111th	John Lewis	GA-05	2003–2020	2nd position not established			Jim Clyburn	Nancy Pelosi — Dem majority –
112th	John Lewis	GA-05	2003–2020	2nd position not established			Steny Hoyer	John Boehner — GOP majority —
113th	John Lewis	GA-05	2003–2020	2nd position not established			Steny Hoyer	John Boehner — GOP majority —
114th	John Lewis	GA-05	2003–2020	2nd position not established			Steny Hoyer	John Boehner (Note: Boehner stepped down as House Speaker on October 29, 2015; he was succeeded by Ryan the same day.); Paul Ryan — GOP majority —
115th	John Lewis	GA-05	2003–2020	2nd position not established			Steny Hoyer	Paul Ryan — GOP majority —
116th	John Lewis	GA-05	2003–2020	Jan Schakowsky	IL-09	2019–present	Jim Clyburn	Nancy Pelosi — Dem majority –
117th	G. K. Butterfield	NC-01	2021–2022 (Note: Resigned December 30, 2022, to take on a lobbyist job.)	Jan Schakowsky	IL-09	2019–present	Jim Clyburn	Nancy Pelosi — Dem majority –
118th	Position abolished			Jan Schakowsky	IL-09	2019–present	Katherine Clark	Kevin McCarthy; Patrick McHenry; Mike Johnson — GOP majority —
119th	Position abolished			Jan Schakowsky	IL-09	2019–present	Katherine Clark	Mike Johnson — GOP majority —

==== List of Democratic chief deputy whips ====
Chief deputy whips (only one each Congress)

Congress	Officeholder	District	Term	Party whip	Speaker
84th	Hale Boggs	LA-02	1955–1962 (Note: Resigned to become House Majority Whip.)	Carl Albert	Sam Rayburn — Dem majority –
85th	Hale Boggs	LA-02	1955–1962	Carl Albert	Sam Rayburn — Dem majority –
86th	Hale Boggs	LA-02	1955–1962	Carl Albert	Sam Rayburn — Dem majority –
87th	Hale Boggs	LA-02	1955–1962	Carl Albert	Sam Rayburn — Dem majority –
87th	Tip O'Neill	MA-08	1962–1971	Hale Boggs	John W. McCormack — Dem majority –
88th	Tip O'Neill	MA-08	1962–1971	Hale Boggs	John W. McCormack — Dem majority –
89th	Tip O'Neill	MA-08	1962–1971	Hale Boggs	John W. McCormack — Dem majority –
90th	Tip O'Neill	MA-08	1962–1971	Hale Boggs	John W. McCormack — Dem majority –
91st	Tip O'Neill	MA-08	1962–1971	Hale Boggs	John W. McCormack — Dem majority –
92nd	John Brademas	IN-03	1971–1973	Tip O'Neill	Carl Albert — Dem majority –
92nd	John J. McFall	CA-15	1971–1973	Tip O'Neill	Carl Albert — Dem majority –
93rd	John Brademas	IN-03	1973–1977	John J. McFall	Carl Albert — Dem majority –
94th	John Brademas	IN-03	1973–1977	John J. McFall	Carl Albert — Dem majority –
95th	Dan Rostenkowski	IL-08	1977–1981	John Brademas	Tip O'Neill — Dem majority –
96th	Dan Rostenkowski	IL-08	1977–1981	John Brademas	Tip O'Neill — Dem majority –
97th	Bill Alexander	AR-01	1981–1987	Tom Foley	Tip O'Neill — Dem majority –
98th	Bill Alexander	AR-01	1981–1987	Tom Foley	Tip O'Neill — Dem majority –
99th	Bill Alexander	AR-01	1981–1987	Tom Foley	Tip O'Neill — Dem majority –
100th	David Bonior	MI-12	1987–1991	Tony Coelho	Jim Wright — Dem majority –
101st	David Bonior	MI-12	1987–1991	Tony Coelho (Note: Tony Coelho resigned on June 15, 1989, after press reports of a financial scandal surfaced. On the same day he was succeeded by then House Democratic Caucus Chairman, William H. Gray III.); William H. Gray III	Jim Wright; Tom Foley — Dem majority –

Chief deputy whips (more than one each Congress)

	Officeholders							
Congress (Years)	Position 1	Position 2	Position 3	Position 4	Position 5	Position 6	Position 7	Speaker (majority)
102nd (1991–1993)	John Lewis (GA-05)	Barbara B. Kennelly (CT-02)	Butler Derrick (SC-03)	Position not established	Positions not established			Tom Foley (Dem majority)
103rd (1993–1995)	John Lewis (GA-05)	Barbara B. Kennelly (CT-02)	Butler Derrick (SC-03)	Bill Richardson (NM-03)	Positions not established			Tom Foley (Dem majority)
104th (1995–1997)	John Lewis (GA-05)	Rosa DeLauro (CT-03)	Vacant	Bill Richardson (NM-03)	Positions not established			Newt Gingrich (GOP majority)
105th (1997–1999)	John Lewis (GA-05)	Rosa DeLauro (CT-03)	Bob Menendez (NJ-13)	Chet Edwards (TX-11)	Positions not established			Newt Gingrich (GOP majority)
106th (1999–2001)	John Lewis (GA-05)	Vacant	Maxine Waters (CA-35) Ed Pastor (AZ-02, 04, 07)	Chet Edwards (TX-11)	Positions not established			Dennis Hastert (GOP majority)
107th (2001–2003)	John Lewis (GA-05)	Vacant	Maxine Waters (CA-35) Ed Pastor (AZ-02, 04, 07)	Max Sandlin (TX-01)	Positions not established			Dennis Hastert (GOP majority)
108th (2003–2005)	Jan Schakowsky (IL-09)	Vacant	Maxine Waters (CA-35) Ed Pastor (AZ-02, 04, 07)	Max Sandlin (TX-01)	Joe Crowley (NY-07)	Ron Kind (WI-03)	Baron Hill (IN-09)	Dennis Hastert (GOP majority)
109th (2005–2007	Jan Schakowsky (IL-09)	Vacant	Maxine Waters (CA-35) Ed Pastor (AZ-02, 04, 07)	Diana DeGette (CO-01)	Joe Crowley (NY-07)	Ron Kind (WI-03)	John Tanner (TN-08)	Dennis Hastert (GOP majority)
110th (2007–2009)	Jan Schakowsky (IL-09)	G. K. Butterfield (NC-01)	Maxine Waters (CA-35) Ed Pastor (AZ-02, 04, 07)	Diana DeGette (CO-01)	Joe Crowley (NY-07)	Debbie Wasserman Schultz (FL-25)	John Tanner (TN-08)	Nancy Pelosi (Dem majority)
111th (2009–2011)	Jan Schakowsky (IL-09)	G. K. Butterfield (NC-01)	Maxine Waters (CA-35) Ed Pastor (AZ-02, 04, 07)	Diana DeGette (CO-01)	Joe Crowley (NY-07)	Debbie Wasserman Schultz (FL-25)	John Tanner (TN-08)	Nancy Pelosi (Dem majority)
112th (2011–2013)	Jan Schakowsky (IL-09)	G. K. Butterfield (NC-01)	Maxine Waters (CA-35) Ed Pastor (AZ-02, 04, 07)	Diana DeGette (CO-01)	Joe Crowley (NY-07)	Debbie Wasserman Schultz (FL-25) Peter Welch (VT at-large)	Jim Matheson (UT-02, 04)	John Boehner (GOP majority)
113th (2013–2015)	Jan Schakowsky (IL-09)	G. K. Butterfield (NC-01)	Terri Sewell (AL-07)	Diana DeGette (CO-01)	Keith Ellison (MN-05) Ben Ray Luján (NM-03)	Debbie Wasserman Schultz (FL-25) Peter Welch (VT at-large)	Jim Matheson (UT-02, 04)	John Boehner (GOP majority)
114th (2015–2017)	Jan Schakowsky (IL-09)	G. K. Butterfield (NC-01)	Terri Sewell (AL-07)	Diana DeGette (CO-01)	Keith Ellison (MN-05)	Debbie Wasserman Schultz (FL-25) Peter Welch (VT at-large)	Joaquin Castro (TX-20) Kyrsten Sinema (AZ-09)	John Boehner; Paul Ryan (GOP majority)
115th (2017–2019)	Jan Schakowsky (IL-09)	G. K. Butterfield (NC-01)	Terri Sewell (AL-07)	Diana DeGette (CO-01)	Keith Ellison (MN-05)	Debbie Wasserman Schultz (FL-25) Peter Welch (VT at-large)	Joaquin Castro (TX-20) Kyrsten Sinema (AZ-09)	John Boehner; Paul Ryan (GOP majority)
116th (2019–2021)	Henry Cuellar (TX-28)	G. K. Butterfield (NC-01)	Terri Sewell (AL-07)	Sheila Jackson Lee (TX-18) Dan Kildee (MI-05)	Pete Aguilar (CA-33)	Debbie Wasserman Schultz (FL-25) Peter Welch (VT at-large)	Vacant	Nancy Pelosi (Dem majority)
117th (2021–2023)	Henry Cuellar (TX-28)	Jimmy Panetta (CA-19)	Terri Sewell (AL-07)	Sheila Jackson Lee (TX-18) Dan Kildee (MI-05)	Stephanie Murphy (FL-07)	Debbie Wasserman Schultz (FL-25) Peter Welch (VT at-large)	Vacant	Nancy Pelosi (Dem majority)
118th (2023–2025)	Henry Cuellar (TX-28)	Jimmy Panetta (CA-19)	Terri Sewell (AL-07)	Sheila Jackson Lee (Note: Served in this role until her death on July 19, 2024.) (TX-18)	Sharice Davids (KS-03) Deborah Ross (NC-02)	Linda Sánchez (CA-38) Marilyn Strickland (WA-10)	Colin Allred (TX-32)	Kevin McCarthy; Patrick McHenry; Mike Johnson (GOP majority)
119th (2025–2027)	Henry Cuellar (TX-28)	Jimmy Panetta (CA-19)	Terri Sewell (AL-07)	Vacant	Sharice Davids (KS-03) Deborah Ross (NC-02)	Linda Sánchez (CA-38) Marilyn Strickland (WA-10)	Vacant	Mike Johnson (GOP majority)

=== Assistant party leaders ===
The position of Assistant Democratic Leader was established by Nancy Pelosi on January 3, 2011, and filled by Jim Clyburn to avoid a battle for whip between then-Majority Leader Steny Hoyer and then-Majority Whip Jim Clyburn. The title has undergone several name changes, with the title being known as the titular "Assistant Speaker of the House of Representatives" during Pelosi's second speakership; it is said to replace the Assistant to the Leader post established in 1999; first held by Rosa DeLauro and last held by Chris Van Hollen. There is currently no Republican equivalent in the U.S. House of Representatives.

Congress	Name	District	Title	Term start	Term end	Party leader
106th	Rosa DeLauro	CT-03	House Democratic Assistant to the Leader	January 3, 1999	January 3, 2003	Dick Gephardt
107th	Rosa DeLauro	CT-03	House Democratic Assistant to the Leader	January 3, 1999	January 3, 2003	Dick Gephardt
108th	John Spratt	SC-05	House Democratic Assistant to the Leader	January 3, 2003	January 3, 2007	Nancy Pelosi
109th	John Spratt	SC-05	House Democratic Assistant to the Leader	January 3, 2003	January 3, 2007	Nancy Pelosi
110th	Xavier Becerra	CA-31	House Democratic Assistant to the Leader	January 3, 2007	January 3, 2009	Nancy Pelosi
111th	Chris Van Hollen	MD-08	House Democratic Assistant to the Leader	January 3, 2009	January 3, 2011	Nancy Pelosi
112th	Jim Clyburn	SC-06	House Assistant Democratic Leader	January 3, 2011	January 3, 2019	Nancy Pelosi
113th	Jim Clyburn	SC-06	House Assistant Democratic Leader	January 3, 2011	January 3, 2019	Nancy Pelosi
114th	Jim Clyburn	SC-06	House Assistant Democratic Leader	January 3, 2011	January 3, 2019	Nancy Pelosi
115th	Jim Clyburn	SC-06	House Assistant Democratic Leader	January 3, 2011	January 3, 2019	Nancy Pelosi
116th	Ben Ray Luján	NM-03	Assistant Speaker of the U.S. House of Representatives	January 3, 2019	January 3, 2021	Nancy Pelosi
117th	Katherine Clark	MA-05	Assistant Speaker of the U.S. House of Representatives	January 3, 2021	January 3, 2023	Nancy Pelosi
118th	Jim Clyburn	SC-06	House Assistant Democratic Leader	January 3, 2023	March 20, 2024	Hakeem Jeffries
118th	Joe Neguse	CO-02	House Assistant Democratic Leader	March 20, 2024	present	Hakeem Jeffries
118th	Joe Neguse	CO-02	House Assistant Democratic Leader	March 20, 2024	present	Hakeem Jeffries
119th	Joe Neguse	CO-02	House Assistant Democratic Leader	March 20, 2024	present	Hakeem Jeffries

== See also ==
- Party leaders of the United States Senate
- Divided government in the United States
