= Superheroes Decoded =

Superheroes Decoded is a 2017 television series of superhero documentaries that aired on History Channel.

Analysts include Stan Lee and George R.R. Martin. Anthony Mackie, the actor who plays Falcon in the Marvel Cinematic Universe, also gives input.

The series is narrated by Kevin Conroy, the actor who has voiced Bruce Wayne / Batman in numerous Batman media starting with Batman: The Animated Series.

== Episodes ==
- American Legends, 20 May 2017, focuses on Superman, Batman, Captain America and Spider-Man
- American Rebels, 27 May 2017, focuses on Black Panther, Wonder Woman, Luke Cage and Wolverine
