= 96th United States Congress =

1979–1981 U.S. Congress

| ← | 95th | 97th | → |
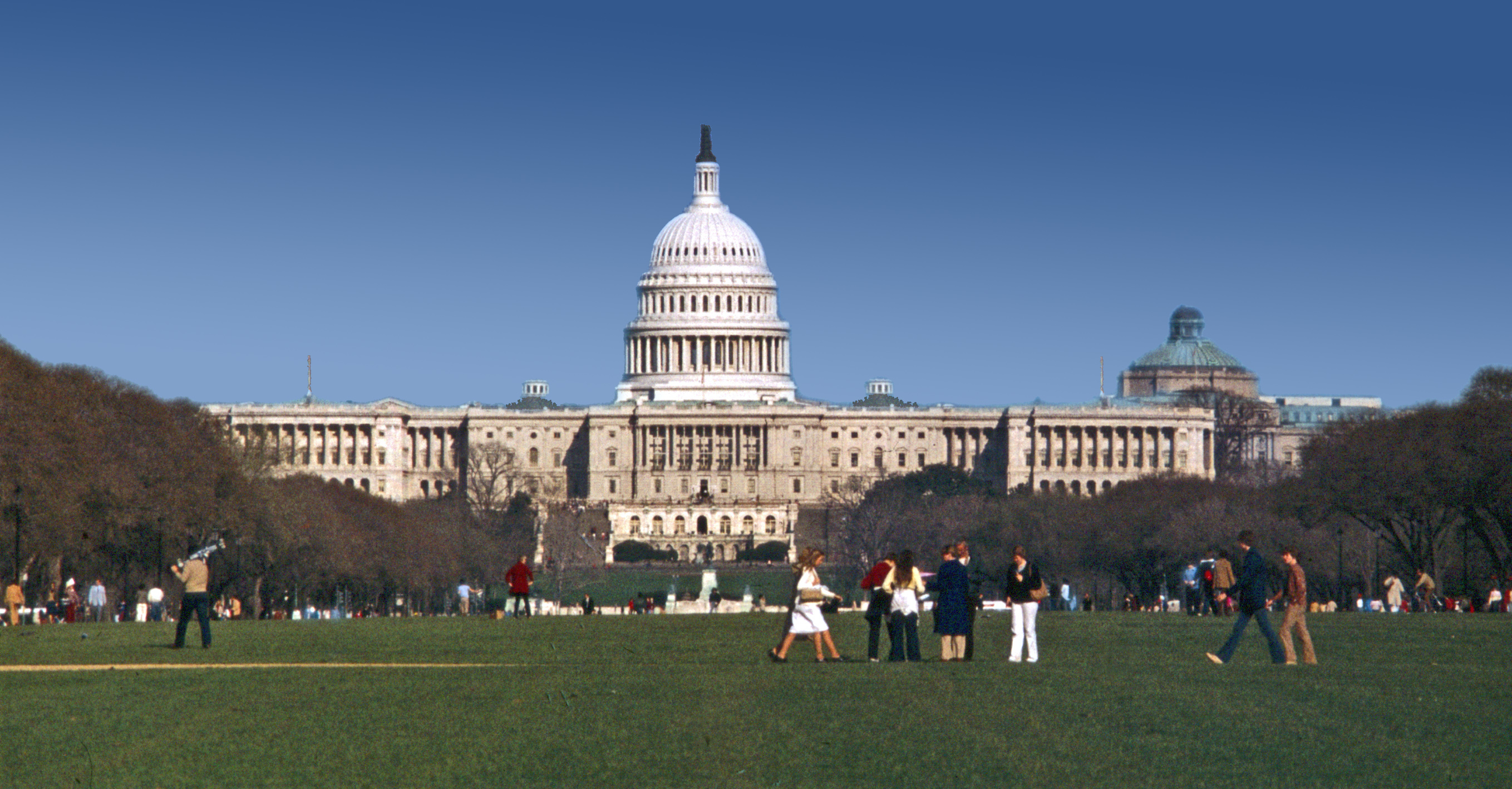
- United States Capitol (1980)

Overview
- Legislative body: United States Congress
- Jurisdiction: United States
- Term: January 3, 1979 – January 3, 1981

Senate
- Members: 100
- President: Walter Mondale (D)
- President pro tempore: Warren Magnuson (D) (until December 5, 1980); Milton Young (R) (Dec 5, 1980 – Dec 6, 1980); Warren Magnuson (D) (from December 6, 1980)
- Party control: Democratic

House of Representatives
- Members: 435 representatives 5 non-voting delegates
- Speaker: Tip O'Neill (D)
- Party control: Democratic

Sessions
- 1st: January 15, 1979 – January 3, 1980
- 2nd: January 3, 1980 – December 16, 1980

The 96th United States Congress was a meeting of the legislative branch of the United States federal government, composed of the United States Senate and the United States House of Representatives. It met in Washington, D.C. from January 3, 1979, to January 3, 1981, during the last two years of Jimmy Carter's presidency.

The apportionment of seats in this House of Representatives was based on the 1970 census.

Both chambers retained a Democratic majority (though downgraded from the supermajority status in the previous Congress), and with President Carter, maintained an overall federal government trifecta. This is the last Congress in which the Democrats retained a trifecta for more than one term.

This is the most recent Congress to feature a Democratic senator from Idaho, Frank Church, who lost re-election in 1980.

== Major events ==
- March 28, 1979: Partial nuclear meltdown at Three Mile Island
- July 11, 1979: Skylab began its return to Earth
- November 4, 1979: Iran hostage crisis began
- 1979 energy crisis
- February 2, 1980: Abscam became public
- April 7, 1980: End of Iran-United States diplomatic relations
- May 18, 1980: Mount St. Helens erupted
- 1980 United States heat wave
- November 4, 1980: United States elections: Reagan/Bush defeated Carter/Mondale. Republicans gain control of the Senate; the first time Republicans gain control of either chamber since 1954.

== Major legislation ==
- April 10, 1979: Taiwan Relations Act, Pub. L. 96–8
- September 9, 1979: Panama Canal Act of 1979, Pub. L. 96–70, 93 Stat. 452
- October 17, 1979: Department of Education Organization Act, Pub. L. 96–88, 93 Stat. 668
- March 17, 1980: Refugee Act of 1980, Pub. L. 96–212, 94 Stat. 102
- March 30, 1980: Depository Institutions Deregulation and Monetary Control Act
- September 19, 1980: Regulatory Flexibility Act, Pub. L. 96–354, 94 Stat. 1164
- September 29, 1980: Fish and Wildlife Conservation Act of 1980, Pub. L. 96–366, 94 Stat. 1322
- October 7, 1980: Mental Health Systems Act of 1980
- October 14, 1980: Staggers Rail Act of 1980, Pub. L. 96–448, 94 Stat. 1895
- October 15, 1980: Classified Information Procedures Act, Pub. L. 96–456, 94 Stat. 2025
- December 2, 1980: Alaska National Interest Lands Conservation Act, Pub. L. 96–487, 94 Stat. 2371
- December 11, 1980: Comprehensive Environmental Response, Compensation, and Liability Act (CERCLA or Superfund), Pub. L. 96–510, 94 Stat. 2767
- December 11, 1980: Paperwork Reduction Act of 1980, Pub. L. 96–511, 94 Stat. 2812
- December 12, 1980: Defense Officer Personnel Management Act, Pub. L. 96–513
- December 12, 1980: Bayh–Dole Act, Pub. L. 96–517, 94 Stat. 3018
- December 22, 1980: Nuclear Safety, Research, Demonstration, and Development Act of 1980, Pub. L. 96–567, 94 Stat. 3329

== Party summary ==
=== Senate ===
Party standings on the opening day of the 96th Congress 57 Democratic senators 1 independent senator, caucusing with Democrats 42 Republican senators

| | Party (shading shows control) | | | Total | Vacant |
| | Democratic (D) | Independent (I) | Republican (R) | Total | Vacant |
|---|---|---|---|---|---|
| End of previous congress | 58 | 1 | 41 | 100 | 0 |
| Begin | 58 | 1 | 41 | 100 | 0 |
| End | 55 | 1 | 44 | 100 | 0 |
| Final voting share | 55.0% | 1.0% | 44.0% | | |
| Beginning of next congress | 46 | 1 | 53 | 100 | 0 |

=== House of Representatives ===
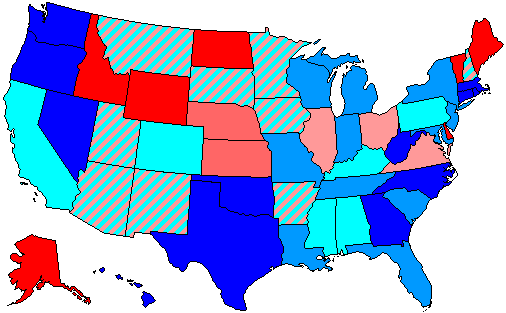
House seats by party holding plurality in state: 80+% to 100% Republican / 80+% to 100% Democratic; 60+% to 80% Republican / 60+% to 80% Democratic; 50+% to 60% Republican / 50+% to 60% Democratic; striped: 50–50 split

| | Party (shading shows control) | | | Total | Vacant |
| | Democratic (D) | Republican (R) | Conservative (C) | Total | Vacant |
|---|---|---|---|---|---|
| End of previous congress | 275 | 141 | 0 | 416 | 19 |
| Begin | 276 | 156 | 1 | 433 | 2 |
| End | 272 | 158 | 1 | 431 | 4 |
| Final voting share | 63.1% | 36.7% | 0.2% | | |
| Beginning of next congress | 243 | 191 | 1 | 435 | 0 |

== Leaders ==
Senate President

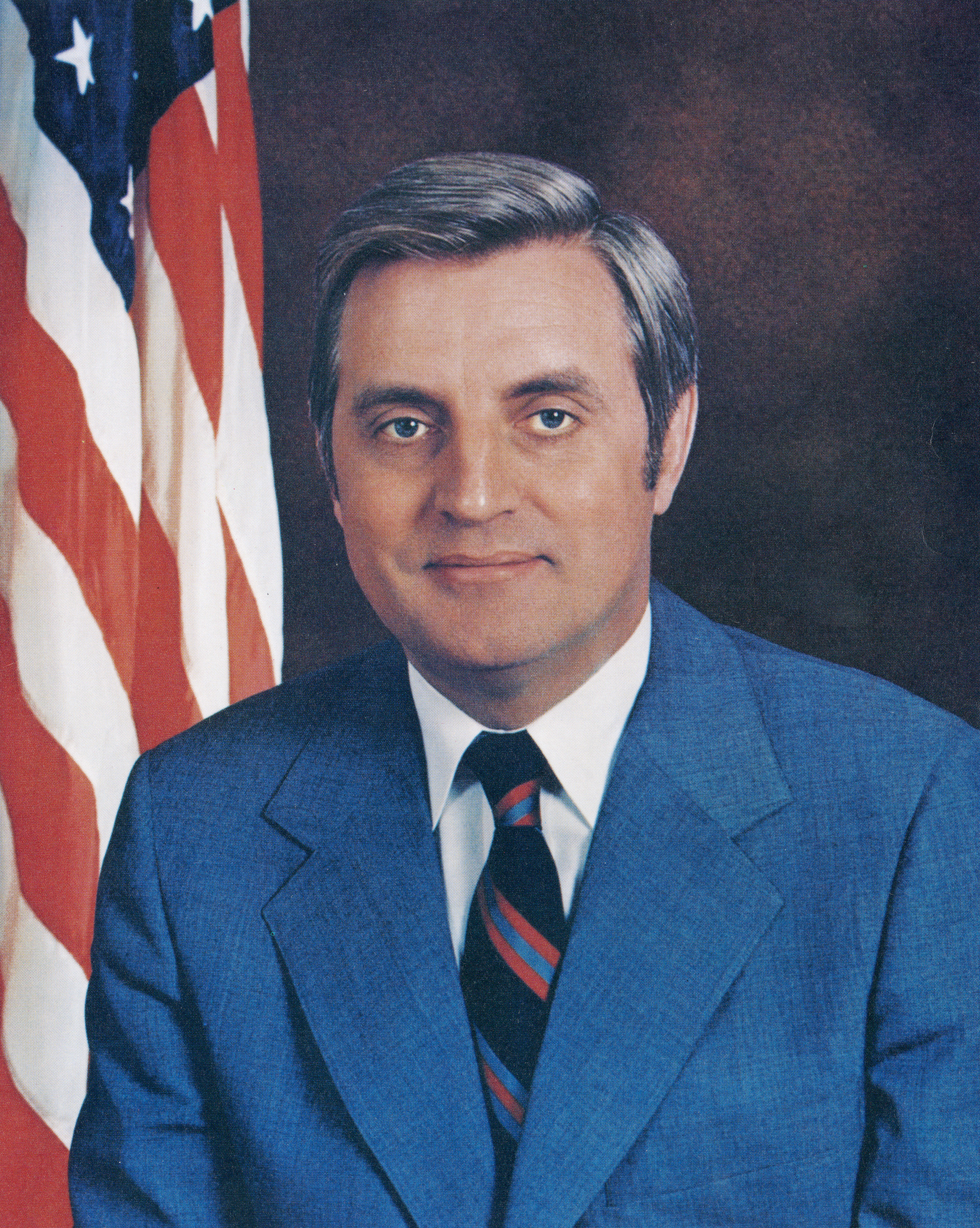
Walter Mondale (D)

Senate President pro tempore

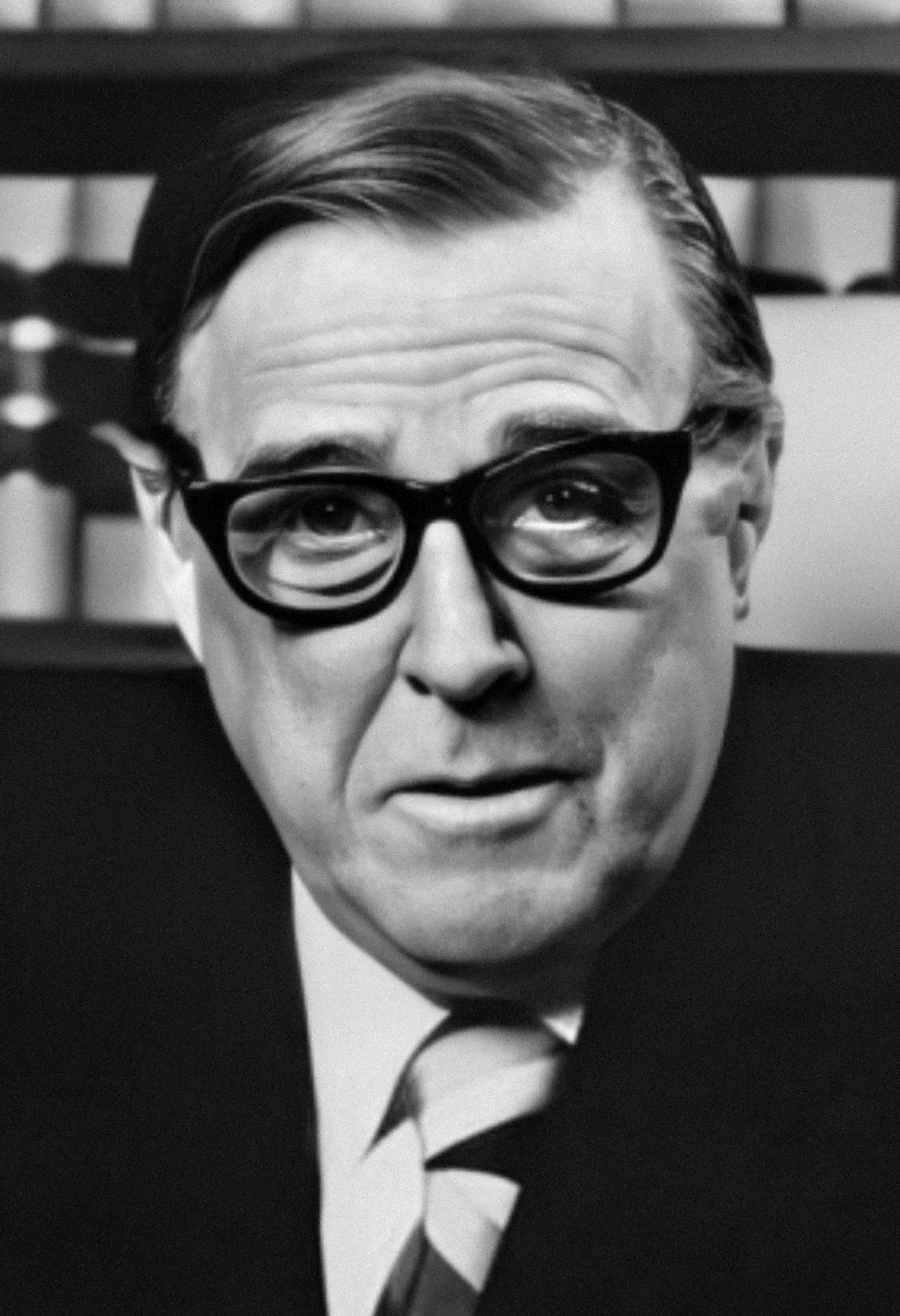
Warren Magnuson (D)

House Speaker

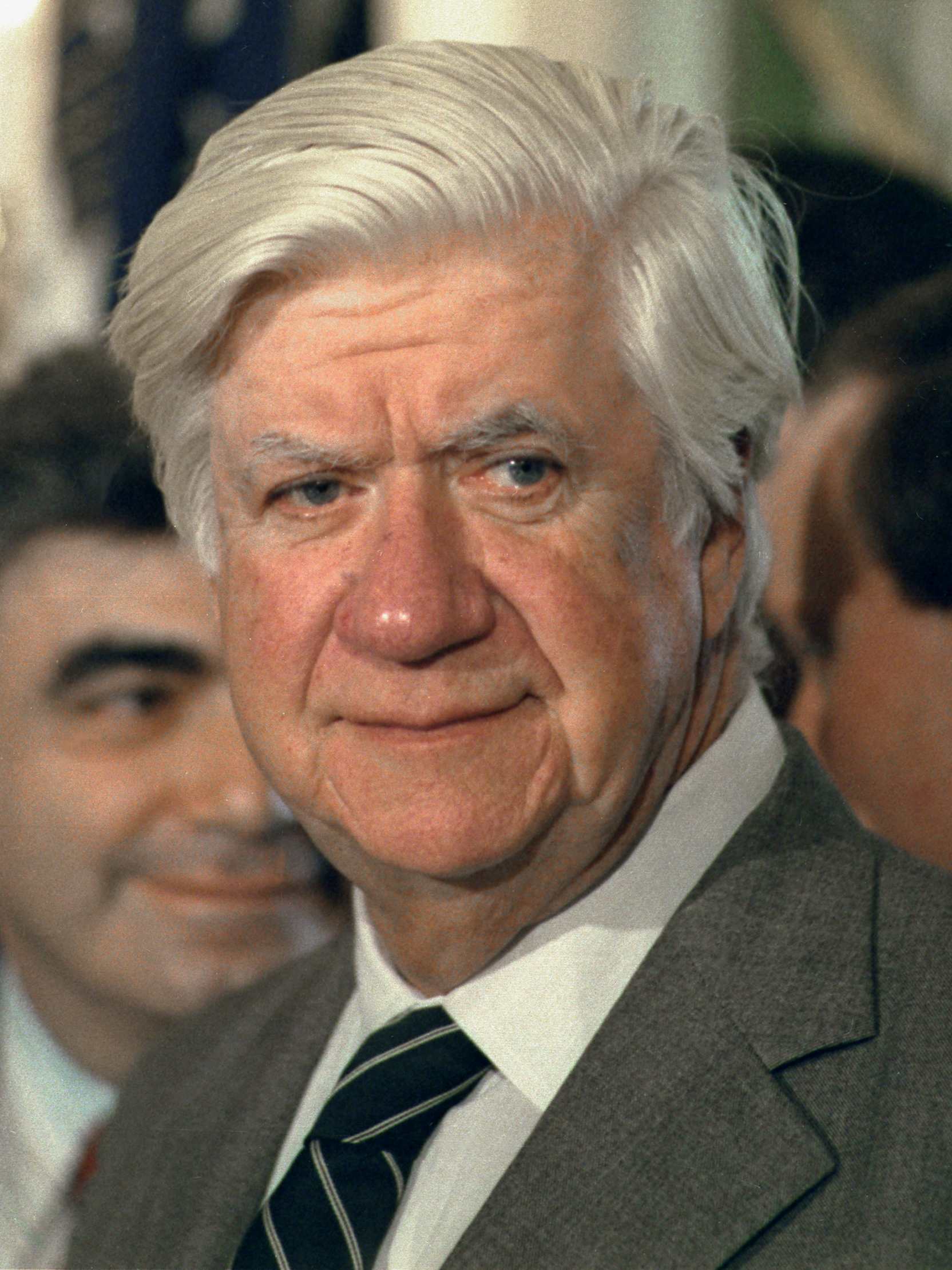
Tip O'Neill (D)

=== Senate ===
- President: Walter Mondale (D)
- President pro tempore: Warren Magnuson (D)
  - Milton Young (R), for just for one day: December 5, 1980

==== Majority (Democratic) leadership ====
- Majority Leader: Robert Byrd
- Majority Whip: Alan Cranston
- Democratic Caucus Secretary: Daniel Inouye
- Democratic Campaign Committee Chairman: Wendell Ford

==== Minority (Republican) leadership ====
- Minority Leader: Howard Baker
- Minority Whip: Ted Stevens
- Republican Conference Chairman: Bob Packwood
- Republican Conference Secretary: Jake Garn
- National Senatorial Committee Chair: John Heinz
- Policy Committee Chairman: John Tower

=== House of Representatives ===
- Speaker: Tip O'Neill (D)

==== Majority (Democratic) leadership ====
- Majority Leader: Jim Wright
- Majority Whip: John Brademas
- Chief Deputy Majority Whip: Dan Rostenkowski
- Democratic Caucus Chairman: Tom Foley
- Democratic Caucus Secretary: Shirley Chisholm
- Democratic Campaign Committee Chairman: James C. Corman

==== Minority (Republican) leadership ====
- Minority Leader: John Jacob Rhodes
- Minority Whip: Robert H. Michel
- Republican Conference Chairman: Samuel L. Devine
- Republican Conference Vice-Chairman: Jack Edwards
- Republican Conference Secretary: Clair Burgener
- Policy Committee Chairman: Bud Shuster
- Republican Campaign Committee Chairman: Guy Vander Jagt

== Caucuses ==
- Congressional Black Caucus
- Congressional Hispanic Caucus
- Congressional Travel & Tourism Caucus
- Congressional Caucus for Women's Issues
- House Democratic Caucus
- Senate Democratic Caucus

== Members ==
This list is arranged by chamber, then by state. Senators are listed in order of seniority, and representatives are listed by district.

=== Senate ===
Senators are popularly elected statewide every two years, with one-third beginning new six-year terms with each Congress, In this Congress, Class 3 meant their term ended with this Congress, requiring reelection in 1980; Class 1 meant their term began in the last Congress, requiring reelection in 1982; and Class 2 meant their term began in this Congress, requiring reelection in 1984.

==== Alabama ====
▌2. Howell Heflin (D)
▌3. Donald Stewart (D), until January 2, 1981

▌Jeremiah Denton (R), from January 2, 1981

==== Alaska ====
▌2. Ted Stevens (R)
▌3. Mike Gravel (D)

==== Arizona ====
▌1. Dennis DeConcini (D)
▌3. Barry Goldwater (R)

==== Arkansas ====
▌2. David Pryor (D)
▌3. Dale Bumpers (D)

==== California ====
▌1. S. I. Hayakawa (R)
▌3. Alan Cranston (D)

==== Colorado ====
▌2. William L. Armstrong (R)
▌3. Gary Hart (D)

==== Connecticut ====
▌1. Lowell Weicker (R)
▌3. Abraham Ribicoff (D)

==== Delaware ====
▌1. William Roth (R)
▌2. Joe Biden (D)

==== Florida ====
▌1. Lawton Chiles (D)
▌3. Richard Stone (D), until December 30, 1980

▌Paula Hawkins (R), from January 1, 1981

==== Georgia ====
▌2. Sam Nunn (D)
▌3. Herman Talmadge (D)

==== Hawaii ====
▌1. Spark Matsunaga (D)
▌3. Daniel Inouye (D)

==== Idaho ====
▌2. James A. McClure (R)
▌3. Frank Church (D)

==== Illinois ====
▌2. Charles H. Percy (R)
▌3. Adlai Stevenson III (D)

==== Indiana ====
▌1. Richard Lugar (R)
▌3. Birch Bayh (D)

==== Iowa ====
▌2. Roger Jepsen (R)
▌3. John Culver (D)

==== Kansas ====
▌2. Nancy Kassebaum (R)
▌3. Bob Dole (R)

==== Kentucky ====
▌2. Walter Dee Huddleston (D)
▌3. Wendell Ford (D)

==== Louisiana ====
▌2. J. Bennett Johnston (D)
▌3. Russell B. Long (D)

==== Maine ====
▌1. Edmund Muskie (D), until May 7, 1980

▌George J. Mitchell (D), from May 19, 1980

▌2. William Cohen (R)

==== Maryland ====
▌1. Paul Sarbanes (D)
▌3. Charles Mathias (R)

==== Massachusetts ====
▌1. Ted Kennedy (D)
▌2. Paul Tsongas (D)

==== Michigan ====
▌1. Donald Riegle (D)
▌2. Carl Levin (D)

==== Minnesota ====
▌1. David Durenberger (I-R) (Note: The Republican Party of Minnesota was officially known as the Independent-Republicans of Minnesota from November 15, 1975, until September 23, 1995, and are counted as Republicans.)
▌2. Rudy Boschwitz (I-R)

==== Mississippi ====
▌1. John C. Stennis (D)
▌2. Thad Cochran (R)

==== Missouri ====
▌1. John Danforth (R)
▌3. Thomas Eagleton (D)

==== Montana ====
▌1. John Melcher (D)
▌2. Max Baucus (D)

==== Nebraska ====
▌1. Edward Zorinsky (D)
▌2. J. James Exon (D)

==== Nevada ====
▌1. Howard Cannon (D)
▌3. Paul Laxalt (R)

==== New Hampshire ====
▌2. Gordon J. Humphrey (R)
▌3. John A. Durkin (D), until December 29, 1980

▌Warren Rudman (R), from December 29, 1980

==== New Jersey ====
▌1. Harrison A. Williams (D)
▌2. Bill Bradley (D)

==== New Mexico ====
▌1. Harrison Schmitt (R)
▌2. Pete Domenici (R)

==== New York ====
▌1. Daniel Patrick Moynihan (D)
▌3. Jacob Javits (R)

==== North Carolina ====
▌2. Jesse Helms (R)
▌3. Robert Burren Morgan (D)

==== North Dakota ====
▌1. Quentin Burdick (D-NPL) (Note: The Minnesota Democratic–Farmer–Labor Party (DFL) and the North Dakota Democratic-Nonpartisan League Party (D-NPL) are the Minnesota and North Dakota affiliates of the U.S. Democratic Party and are counted as Democrats.)
▌3. Milton Young (R)

==== Ohio ====
▌1. Howard Metzenbaum (D)
▌3. John Glenn (D)

==== Oklahoma ====
▌2. David Boren (D)
▌3. Henry Bellmon (R)

==== Oregon ====
▌2. Mark Hatfield (R)
▌3. Bob Packwood (R)

==== Pennsylvania ====
▌1. John Heinz (R)
▌3. Richard Schweiker (R)

==== Rhode Island ====
▌1. John Chafee (R)
▌2. Claiborne Pell (D)

==== South Carolina ====
▌2. Strom Thurmond (R)
▌3. Fritz Hollings (D)

==== South Dakota ====
▌2. Larry Pressler (R)
▌3. George McGovern (D)

==== Tennessee ====
▌1. Jim Sasser (D)
▌2. Howard Baker (R)

==== Texas ====
▌1. Lloyd Bentsen (D)
▌2. John Tower (R)

==== Utah ====
▌1. Orrin Hatch (R)
▌3. Jake Garn (R)

==== Vermont ====
▌1. Robert Stafford (R)
▌3. Patrick Leahy (D)

==== Virginia ====
▌1. Harry F. Byrd Jr. (ID)
▌2. John Warner (R)

==== Washington ====
▌1. Henry M. Jackson (D)
▌3. Warren G. Magnuson (D)

==== West Virginia ====
▌1. Robert Byrd (D)
▌2. Jennings Randolph (D)

==== Wisconsin ====
▌1. William Proxmire (D)
▌3. Gaylord Nelson (D)

==== Wyoming ====
▌1. Malcolm Wallop (R)
▌2. Alan Simpson (R)

Senators' party membership by state at the opening of the 96th Congress in January 1979 2 Democrats 1 Democrat and 1 Republican 2 Republicans 1 Independent and 1 Republican

Senate majority leadership

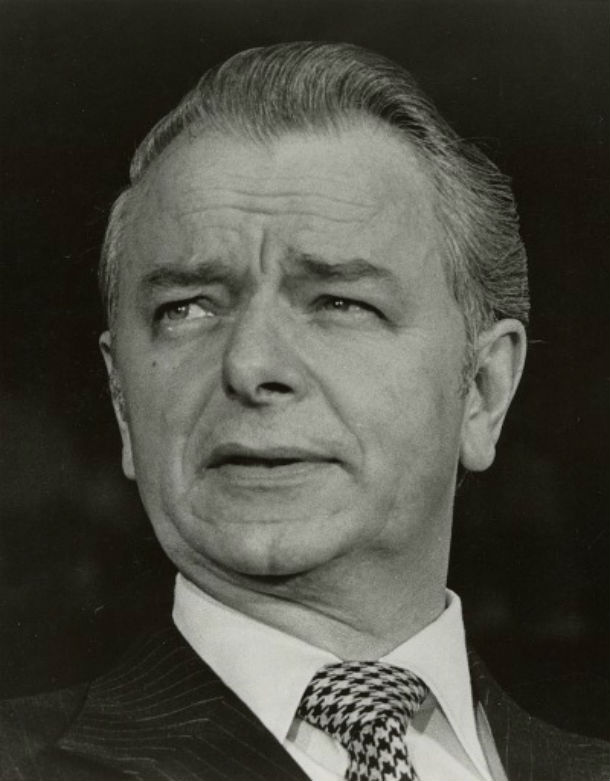
Democratic leader
Robert Byrd

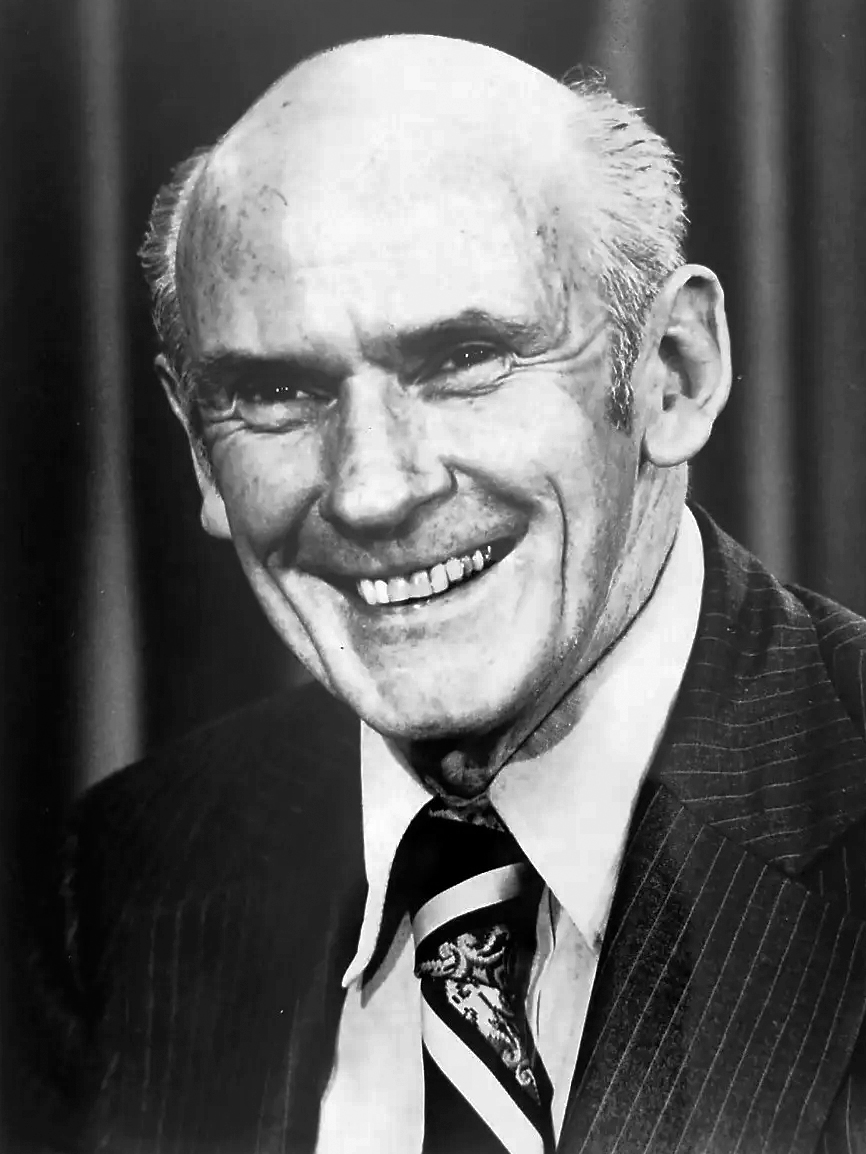
Democratic whip
Alan Cranston

Senate minority leadership

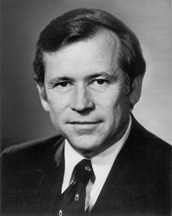
Republican leader
Howard Baker

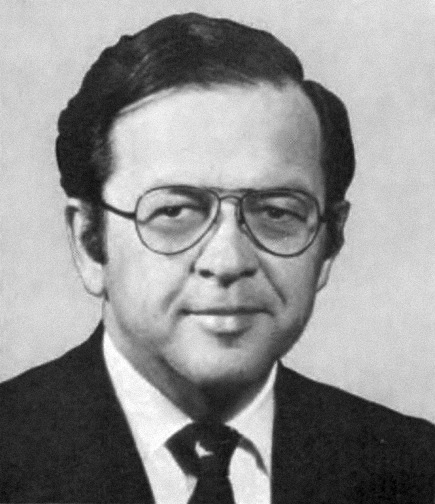
Republican whip
Ted Stevens

=== House of Representatives ===
The names of representatives are preceded by their district numbers.

==== Alabama ====
(4–3 Democratic)

▌1. Jack Edwards (R)
▌2. William Louis Dickinson (R)
▌3. Bill Nichols (D)
▌4. Tom Bevill (D)
▌5. Ronnie Flippo (D)
▌6. John Hall Buchanan Jr. (R)
▌7. Richard Shelby (D)

==== Alaska ====
(1 Republican)

▌At-large. Don Young (R)

==== Arizona ====
(2–2 split)

▌1. John Jacob Rhodes (R)
▌2. Mo Udall (D)
▌3. Bob Stump (D)
▌4. Eldon Rudd (R)

==== Arkansas ====
(2–2 split)

▌1. William Vollie Alexander Jr. (D)
▌2. Ed Bethune (R)
▌3. John Paul Hammerschmidt (R)
▌4. Beryl Anthony Jr. (D)

==== California ====
(25–18 Democratic)

▌1. Harold T. Johnson (D)
▌2. Donald H. Clausen (R)
▌3. Bob Matsui (D)
▌4. Vic Fazio (D)
▌5. John Burton (D)
▌6. Phillip Burton (D)
▌7. George Miller (D)
▌8. Ron Dellums (D)
▌9. Pete Stark (D)
▌10. Don Edwards (D)
▌11. William Royer (R), from April 3, 1979
▌12. Pete McCloskey (R)
▌13. Norman Mineta (D)
▌14. Norman D. Shumway (R)
▌15. Tony Coelho (D)
▌16. Leon Panetta (D)
▌17. Chip Pashayan (R)
▌18. Bill Thomas (R)
▌19. Robert J. Lagomarsino (R)
▌20. Barry Goldwater Jr. (R)
▌21. James C. Corman (D)
▌22. Carlos Moorhead (R)
▌23. Anthony Beilenson (D)
▌24. Henry Waxman (D)
▌25. Edward R. Roybal (D)
▌26. John H. Rousselot (R)
▌27. Bob Dornan (R)
▌28. Julian Dixon (D)
▌29. Augustus Hawkins (D)
▌30. George E. Danielson (D)
▌31. Charles H. Wilson (D)
▌32. Glenn M. Anderson (D)
▌33. Wayne R. Grisham (R)
▌34. Dan Lungren (R)
▌35. James F. Lloyd (D)
▌36. George Brown Jr. (D)
▌37. Jerry Lewis (R)
▌38. Jerry M. Patterson (D)
▌39. William E. Dannemeyer (R)
▌40. Robert Badham (R)
▌41. Bob Wilson (R)
▌42. Lionel Van Deerlin (D)
▌43. Clair Burgener (R)

==== Colorado ====
(3–2 Democratic)

▌1. Pat Schroeder (D)
▌2. Tim Wirth (D)
▌3. Ray Kogovsek (D)
▌4. James Paul Johnson (R)
▌5. Ken Kramer (R)

==== Connecticut ====
(5–1 Democratic)

▌1. William R. Cotter (D)
▌2. Chris Dodd (D)
▌3. Robert Giaimo (D)
▌4. Stewart McKinney (R)
▌5. William R. Ratchford (D)
▌6. Toby Moffett (D)

==== Delaware ====
(1 Republican)

▌At-large. Thomas B. Evans Jr. (R)

==== Florida ====
(12–3 Democratic)

▌1. Earl Hutto (D)
▌2. Don Fuqua (D)
▌3. Charles E. Bennett (D)
▌4. Bill Chappell (D)
▌5. Richard Kelly (R)
▌6. Bill Young (R)
▌7. Sam Gibbons (D)
▌8. Andy Ireland (D)
▌9. Bill Nelson (D)
▌10. Skip Bafalis (R)
▌11. Dan Mica (D)
▌12. Edward J. Stack (D)
▌13. William Lehman (D)
▌14. Claude Pepper (D)
▌15. Dante Fascell (D)

==== Georgia ====
(9–1 Democratic)

▌1. Bo Ginn (D)
▌2. Dawson Mathis (D)
▌3. Jack Brinkley (D)
▌4. Elliott H. Levitas (D)
▌5. Wyche Fowler (D)
▌6. Newt Gingrich (R)
▌7. Larry McDonald (D)
▌8. Billy Lee Evans (D)
▌9. Ed Jenkins (D)
▌10. Doug Barnard Jr. (D)

==== Hawaii ====
(2 Democrats)

▌1. Cecil Heftel (D)
▌2. Daniel Akaka (D)

==== Idaho ====
(2 Republicans)

▌1. Steve Symms (R)
▌2. George V. Hansen (R)

==== Illinois ====
(13–11 Republican)

▌1. Bennett Stewart (D)
▌2. Morgan F. Murphy (D)
▌3. Marty Russo (D)
▌4. Ed Derwinski (R)
▌5. John G. Fary (D)
▌6. Henry Hyde (R)
▌7. Cardiss Collins (D)
▌8. Dan Rostenkowski (D)
▌9. Sidney R. Yates (D)
▌10. Abner J. Mikva (D), until September 26, 1979

▌John Porter (R), from January 22, 1980

▌11. Frank Annunzio (D)
▌12. Phil Crane (R)
▌13. Robert McClory (R)
▌14. John N. Erlenborn (R)
▌15. Tom Corcoran (R)
▌16. John B. Anderson (R)
▌17. George M. O'Brien (R)
▌18. Robert H. Michel (R)
▌19. Tom Railsback (R)
▌20. Paul Findley (R)
▌21. Edward Rell Madigan (R)
▌22. Dan Crane (R)
▌23. Melvin Price (D)
▌24. Paul Simon (D)

==== Indiana ====
(7–4 Democratic)

▌1. Adam Benjamin Jr. (D)
▌2. Floyd Fithian (D)
▌3. John Brademas (D)
▌4. Dan Quayle (R)
▌5. Elwood Hillis (R)
▌6. David W. Evans (D)
▌7. John T. Myers (R)
▌8. H. Joel Deckard (R)
▌9. Lee H. Hamilton (D)
▌10. Philip Sharp (D)
▌11. Andrew Jacobs Jr. (D)

==== Iowa ====
(3–3 split)

▌1. Jim Leach (R)
▌2. Tom Tauke (R)
▌3. Chuck Grassley (R)
▌4. Neal Edward Smith (D)
▌5. Tom Harkin (D)
▌6. Berkley Bedell (D)

==== Kansas ====
(4-1 Republican)

▌1. Keith Sebelius (R)
▌2. James Edmund Jeffries (R)
▌3. Larry Winn (R)
▌4. Dan Glickman (D)
▌5. Bob Whittaker (R)

==== Kentucky ====
(4–3 Democratic)

▌1. Carroll Hubbard (D)
▌2. William Natcher (D)
▌3. Romano Mazzoli (D)
▌4. Gene Snyder (R)
▌5. Tim Lee Carter (R)
▌6. Larry J. Hopkins (R)
▌7. Carl D. Perkins (D)

==== Louisiana ====
(5–3 Democratic)

▌1. Bob Livingston (R)
▌2. Lindy Boggs (D)
▌3. Dave Treen (R), until March 10, 1980

▌Billy Tauzin (D), from May 22, 1980

▌4. Buddy Leach (D)
▌5. Jerry Huckaby (D)
▌6. Henson Moore (R)
▌7. John Breaux (D)
▌8. Gillis William Long (D)

==== Maine ====
(2 Republicans)

▌1. David F. Emery (R)
▌2. Olympia Snowe (R)

==== Maryland ====
(6–2 Democratic)

▌1. Robert Bauman (R)
▌2. Clarence Long (D)
▌3. Barbara Mikulski (D)
▌4. Marjorie Holt (R)
▌5. Gladys Spellman (D)
▌6. Beverly Byron (D)
▌7. Parren Mitchell (D)
▌8. Michael D. Barnes (D)

==== Massachusetts ====
(10–2 Democratic)

▌1. Silvio O. Conte (R)
▌2. Edward Boland (D)
▌3. Joseph D. Early (D)
▌4. Robert Drinan (D)
▌5. James Shannon (D)
▌6. Nicholas Mavroules (D)
▌7. Ed Markey (D)
▌8. Tip O'Neill (D)
▌9. Joe Moakley (D)
▌10. Margaret Heckler (R)
▌11. Brian J. Donnelly (D)
▌12. Gerry Studds (D)

==== Michigan ====
(13–6 Democratic)

▌1. John Conyers (D)
▌2. Carl Pursell (R)
▌3. Howard Wolpe (D)
▌4. David Stockman (R)
▌5. Harold S. Sawyer (R)
▌6. Milton Robert Carr (D)
▌7. Dale Kildee (D)
▌8. J. Bob Traxler (D)
▌9. Guy Vander Jagt (R)
▌10. Donald J. Albosta (D)
▌11. Robert William Davis (R)
▌12. David Bonior (D)
▌13. Charles Diggs (D), until June 3, 1980

▌George Crockett Jr. (D), from November 4, 1980

▌14. Lucien Nedzi (D)
▌15. William D. Ford (D)
▌16. John D. Dingell Jr. (D)
▌17. William M. Brodhead (D)
▌18. James Blanchard (D)
▌19. William Broomfield (R)

==== Minnesota ====
(4–4 split)

▌1. Arlen Erdahl (I-R)
▌2. Tom Hagedorn (I-R)
▌3. Bill Frenzel (I-R)
▌4. Bruce Vento (DFL)
▌5. Martin Olav Sabo (DFL)
▌6. Rick Nolan (DFL)
▌7. Arlan Stangeland (I-R)
▌8. Jim Oberstar (DFL)

==== Mississippi ====
(3–2 Democratic)

▌1. Jamie L. Whitten (D)
▌2. David R. Bowen (D)
▌3. Sonny Montgomery (D)
▌4. Jon Hinson (R)
▌5. Trent Lott (R)

==== Missouri ====
(8–2 Democratic)

▌1. Bill Clay (D)
▌2. Robert A. Young (D)
▌3. Dick Gephardt (D)
▌4. Ike Skelton (D)
▌5. Richard Walker Bolling (D)
▌6. Tom Coleman (R)
▌7. Gene Taylor (R)
▌8. Richard Howard Ichord Jr. (D)
▌9. Harold Volkmer (D)
▌10. Bill Burlison (D)

==== Montana ====
(1–1 split)

▌1. Pat Williams (D)
▌2. Ron Marlenee (R)

==== Nebraska ====
(2–1 Republican)

▌1. Doug Bereuter (R)
▌2. John Joseph Cavanaugh III (D)
▌3. Virginia D. Smith (R)

==== Nevada ====
(1 Democrat)

▌At-large. James David Santini (D)

==== New Hampshire ====
(1–1 split)

▌1. Norman D'Amours (D)
▌2. James Colgate Cleveland (R)

==== New Jersey ====
(10–5 Democratic)

▌1. James Florio (D)
▌2. William J. Hughes (D)
▌3. James J. Howard (D)
▌4. Frank Thompson (D), until December 29, 1980
▌5. Millicent Fenwick (R)
▌6. Edwin B. Forsythe (R)
▌7. Andrew Maguire (D)
▌8. Robert A. Roe (D)
▌9. Harold C. Hollenbeck (R)
▌10. Peter W. Rodino (D)
▌11. Joseph Minish (D)
▌12. Matthew John Rinaldo (R)
▌13. Jim Courter (R)
▌14. Frank Joseph Guarini (D)
▌15. Edward J. Patten (D)

==== New Mexico ====
(1–1 split)

▌1. Manuel Lujan Jr. (R)
▌2. Harold L. Runnels (D), until August 5, 1980

==== New York ====
(26–13 Democratic)

▌1. William Carney (C) (Note: Elected as a Conservative but sat with the Republicans.)
▌2. Thomas Downey (D)
▌3. Jerome Ambro (D)
▌4. Norman F. Lent (R)
▌5. John W. Wydler (R)
▌6. Lester L. Wolff (D)
▌7. Joseph P. Addabbo (D)
▌8. Benjamin Stanley Rosenthal (D)
▌9. Geraldine Ferraro (D)
▌10. Mario Biaggi (D)
▌11. James H. Scheuer (D)
▌12. Shirley Chisholm (D)
▌13. Stephen Solarz (D)
▌14. Fred Richmond (D)
▌15. Leo C. Zeferetti (D)
▌16. Elizabeth Holtzman (D)
▌17. John M. Murphy (D)
▌18. Bill Green (R)
▌19. Charles Rangel (D)
▌20. Theodore S. Weiss (D)
▌21. Robert Garcia (D)
▌22. Jonathan Brewster Bingham (D)
▌23. Peter A. Peyser (D)
▌24. Richard Ottinger (D)
▌25. Hamilton Fish IV (R)
▌26. Benjamin Gilman (R)
▌27. Matthew F. McHugh (D)
▌28. Samuel S. Stratton (D)
▌29. Gerald Solomon (R)
▌30. Robert C. McEwen (R)
▌31. Donald J. Mitchell (R)
▌32. James M. Hanley (D)
▌33. Gary A. Lee (R)
▌34. Frank Horton (R)
▌35. Barber Conable (R)
▌36. John J. LaFalce (D)
▌37. Henry J. Nowak (D)
▌38. Jack Kemp (R)
▌39. Stan Lundine (D)

==== North Carolina ====
(9–2 Democratic)

▌1. Walter B. Jones Sr. (D)
▌2. Lawrence H. Fountain (D)
▌3. Charles Orville Whitley (D)
▌4. Ike Franklin Andrews (D)
▌5. Stephen L. Neal (D)
▌6. L. Richardson Preyer (D)
▌7. Charlie Rose (D)
▌8. Bill Hefner (D)
▌9. James G. Martin (R)
▌10. Jim Broyhill (R)
▌11. V. Lamar Gudger (D)

==== North Dakota ====
(1 Republican)

▌At-large. Mark Andrews (R)

==== Ohio ====
(13–10 Republican)

▌1. Bill Gradison (R)
▌2. Tom Luken (D)
▌3. Tony P. Hall (D)
▌4. Tennyson Guyer (R)
▌5. Del Latta (R)
▌6. Bill Harsha (R)
▌7. Bud Brown (R)
▌8. Tom Kindness (R)
▌9. Thomas L. Ashley (D)
▌10. Clarence E. Miller (R)
▌11. J. William Stanton (R)
▌12. Samuel L. Devine (R)
▌13. Donald J. Pease (D)
▌14. John F. Seiberling (D)
▌15. Chalmers Wylie (R)
▌16. Ralph Regula (R)
▌17. John M. Ashbrook (R)
▌18. Douglas Applegate (D)
▌19. Lyle Williams (R)
▌20. Mary Rose Oakar (D)
▌21. Louis Stokes (D)
▌22. Charles Vanik (D)
▌23. Ronald M. Mottl (D)

==== Oklahoma ====
(5–1 Democratic)

▌1. James R. Jones (D)
▌2. Mike Synar (D)
▌3. Wes Watkins (D)
▌4. Tom Steed (D)
▌5. Mickey Edwards (R)
▌6. Glenn English (D)

==== Oregon ====
(4 Democrats)

▌1. Les AuCoin (D)
▌2. Al Ullman (D)
▌3. Robert B. Duncan (D)
▌4. Jim Weaver (D)

==== Pennsylvania ====
(15–10 Democratic)

▌1. Michael Myers (D), until October 2, 1980
▌2. William H. Gray III (D)
▌3. Raymond Lederer (D)
▌4. Charles F. Dougherty (R)
▌5. Richard T. Schulze (R)
▌6. Gus Yatron (D)
▌7. Robert W. Edgar (D)
▌8. Peter H. Kostmayer (D)
▌9. Bud Shuster (R)
▌10. Joseph M. McDade (R)
▌11. Dan Flood (D), until January 31, 1980

▌Ray Musto (D), from April 9, 1980

▌12. John Murtha (D)
▌13. Lawrence Coughlin (R)
▌14. William S. Moorhead (D)
▌15. Donald L. Ritter (R)
▌16. Robert Smith Walker (R)
▌17. Allen E. Ertel (D)
▌18. Doug Walgren (D)
▌19. William F. Goodling (R)
▌20. Joseph M. Gaydos (D)
▌21. Donald A. Bailey (D)
▌22. Austin Murphy (D)
▌23. William F. Clinger Jr. (R)
▌24. Marc L. Marks (R)
▌25. Eugene Atkinson (D)

==== Rhode Island ====
(2 Democrats)

▌1. Fernand St Germain (D)
▌2. Edward Beard (D)

==== South Carolina ====
(4–2 Democratic)

▌1. Mendel Jackson Davis (D)
▌2. Floyd Spence (R)
▌3. Butler Derrick (D)
▌4. Carroll A. Campbell Jr. (R)
▌5. Kenneth Lamar Holland (D)
▌6. John Jenrette (D), until December 10, 1980

==== South Dakota ====
(1–1 split)

▌1. Tom Daschle (D)
▌2. James Abdnor (R)

==== Tennessee ====
(5–3 Democratic)

▌1. Jimmy Quillen (R)
▌2. John Duncan Sr. (R)
▌3. Marilyn Lloyd (D)
▌4. Albert Gore Jr. (D)
▌5. Bill Boner (D)
▌6. Robin Beard (R)
▌7. Ed Jones (D)
▌8. Harold Ford Sr. (D)

==== Texas ====
(20–4 Democratic)

▌1. Sam B. Hall Jr. (D)
▌2. Charlie Wilson (D)
▌3. James M. Collins (R)
▌4. Ray Roberts (D)
▌5. Jim Mattox (D)
▌6. Phil Gramm (D)
▌7. Bill Archer (R)
▌8. Robert C. Eckhardt (D)
▌9. Jack Brooks (D)
▌10. J. J. Pickle (D)
▌11. Marvin Leath (D)
▌12. Jim Wright (D)
▌13. Jack Hightower (D)
▌14. Joseph P. Wyatt Jr. (D)
▌15. Kika de la Garza (D)
▌16. Richard Crawford White (D)
▌17. Charles Stenholm (D)
▌18. Mickey Leland (D)
▌19. Kent Hance (D)
▌20. Henry B. González (D)
▌21. Tom Loeffler (R)
▌22. Ron Paul (R)
▌23. Abraham Kazen (D)
▌24. Martin Frost (D)

==== Utah ====
(1–1 split)

▌1. K. Gunn McKay (D)
▌2. David Daniel Marriott (R)

==== Vermont ====
(1 Republican)

▌At-large. Jim Jeffords (R)

==== Virginia ====
(6–4 Republican)

▌1. Paul Trible (R)
▌2. G. William Whitehurst (R)
▌3. David E. Satterfield III (D)
▌4. Robert Daniel (R)
▌5. Dan Daniel (D)
▌6. M. Caldwell Butler (R)
▌7. J. Kenneth Robinson (R)
▌8. Herbert Harris (D)
▌9. William C. Wampler (R)
▌10. Joseph L. Fisher (D)

==== Washington ====
(6–1 Democratic)

▌1. Joel Pritchard (R)
▌2. Al Swift (D)
▌3. Don Bonker (D)
▌4. Mike McCormack (D)
▌5. Tom Foley (D)
▌6. Norm Dicks (D)
▌7. Mike Lowry (D)

==== West Virginia ====
(4 Democrats)

▌1. Bob Mollohan (D)
▌2. Harley Orrin Staggers (D)
▌3. John M. Slack Jr. (D), until March 17, 1980

▌John G. Hutchinson (D), from June 30, 1980

▌4. Nick Rahall (D)

==== Wisconsin ====
(6–3 Democratic)

▌1. Les Aspin (D)
▌2. Robert Kastenmeier (D)
▌3. Alvin Baldus (D)
▌4. Clement J. Zablocki (D)
▌5. Henry S. Reuss (D)
▌6. Tom Petri (R), from April 3, 1979
▌7. Dave Obey (D)
▌8. Toby Roth (R)
▌9. Jim Sensenbrenner (R)

==== Wyoming ====
(1 Republican)

▌At-large. Dick Cheney (R)

==== Non-voting members ====
(3–1 Democratic)

▌District of Columbia. Walter Fauntroy (D)
▌Guam. Antonio Borja Won Pat (D)
▌Puerto Rico. Baltasar Corrada del Rio (PNP)
▌Virgin Islands. Melvin H. Evans (R)

House majority leadership

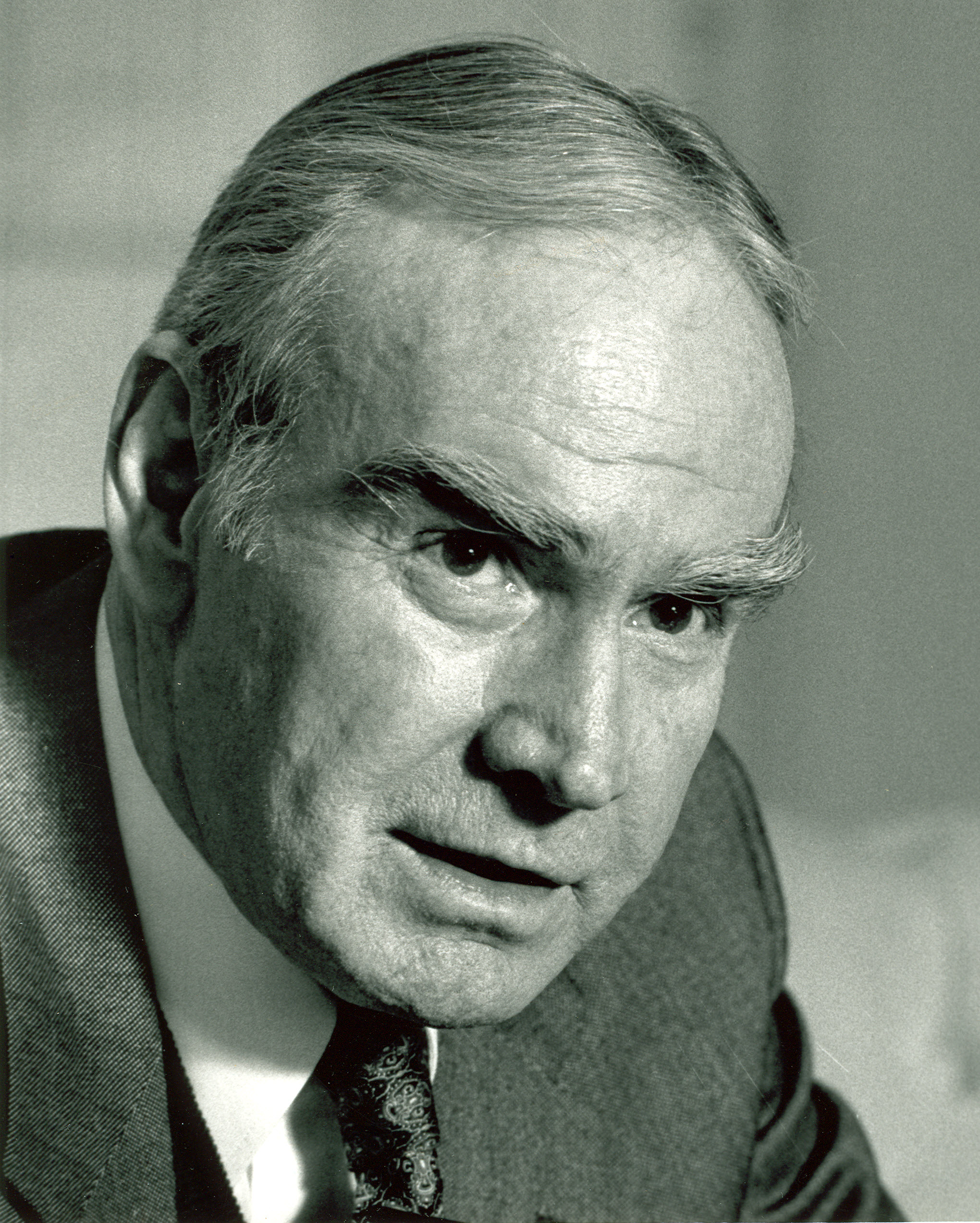
Democratic leader
Jim Wright

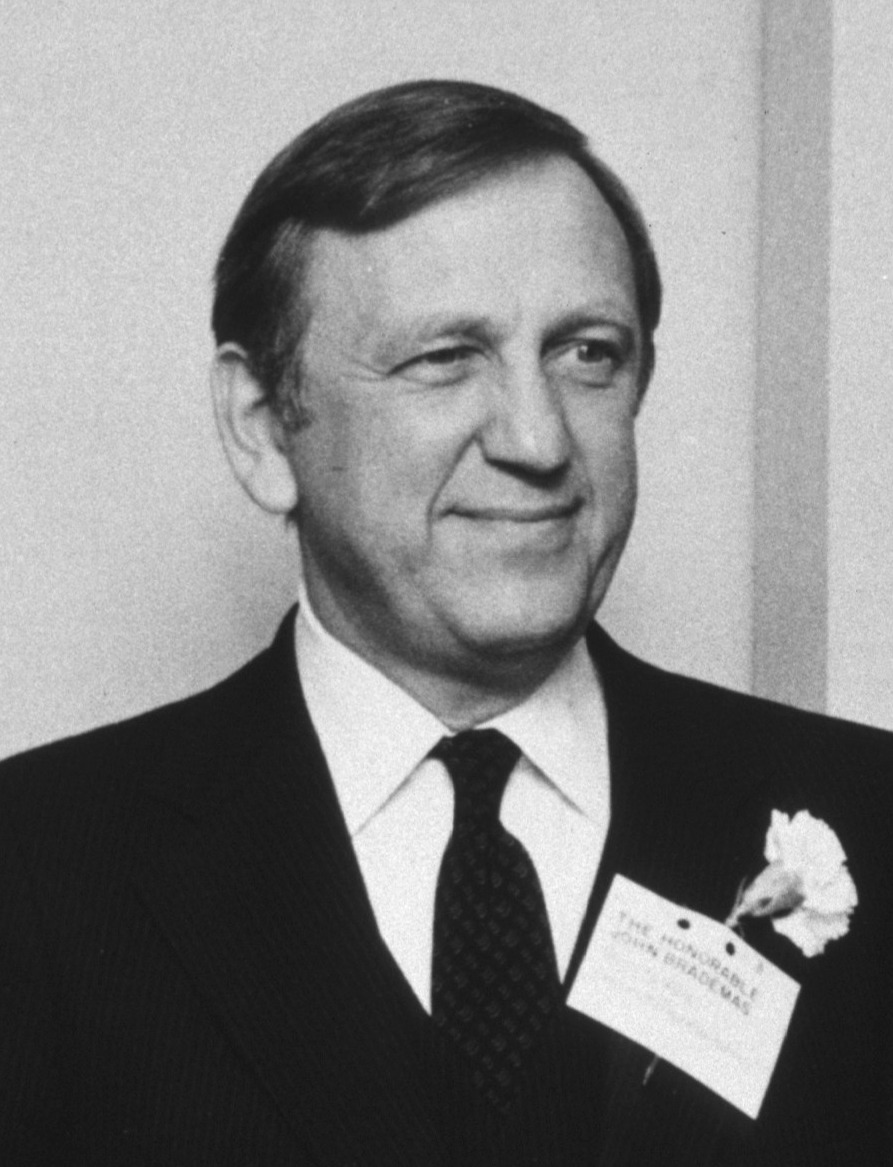
Democratic whip
John Brademas

House minority leadership

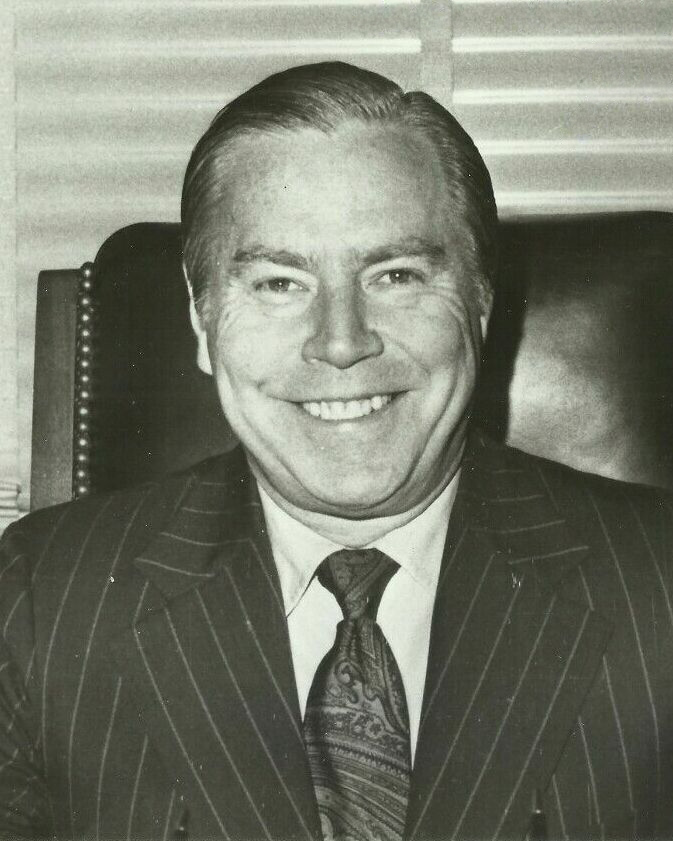
Republican leader
John Jacob Rhodes

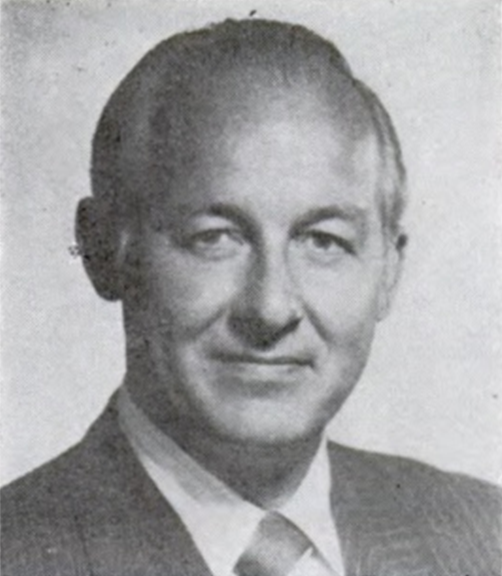
Republican whip
Bob Michel

== Changes in membership ==
The count below reflects changes from the beginning of the first session of this Congress.

=== Senate ===
- Replacements: 4
  - Democratic: 3 seat net loss
  - Republican: 3 seat net gain
- Deaths: 0
- Resignations: 4
- Vacancy: 0
- Total seats with changes: 4

Senate changes
| State (class) | Vacated by | Reason for change | Successor | Date of successor's formal installation (Note: When seated or oath administered, not necessarily when service began.) |
|---|---|---|---|---|
| Maine (Class 1) | Edmund Muskie (D) | Resigned May 7, 1980 to become United States Secretary of State. Successor appointed to finish the term. | George J. Mitchell (D) | May 19, 1980 |
| New Hampshire (Class 3) | John A. Durkin (D) | Resigned December 29, 1980 to give successor priority in seniority. Successor appointed, having already been elected to the next term. | Warren Rudman (R) | December 29, 1980 |
| Florida (Class 3) | Richard Stone (D) | Resigned December 30, 1980 to give successor priority in seniority. Successor appointed, having already been elected to the next term. | Paula Hawkins (R) | January 1, 1981 |
| Alabama (Class 3) | Donald Stewart (D) | Resigned January 2, 1981 to give successor priority in seniority. Successor appointed, having already been elected to the next term. | Jeremiah Denton (R) | January 2, 1981 |

=== House of Representatives ===
- Replacements: 7
  - Democratic: 0 seat net loss
  - Republican: 0 seat net gain
- Deaths: 1
- Resignations: 4
- Expulsion: 1
- Contested election:
- Total seats with changes: 10

House changes
| District | Vacated by | Reason for change | Successor | Date of successor's formal installation |
|---|---|---|---|---|
| California 11th | Vacant | Rep. Leo Ryan died during previous congress | William Royer (R) | April 3, 1979 |
| Wisconsin 6th | Vacant | Rep. William A. Steiger died during previous congress | Tom Petri (R) | April 3, 1979 |
| Illinois 10th | Abner Mikva (D) | Resigned September 26, 1979, after being appointed judge of U.S. Court of Appeals | John Porter (R) | January 22, 1980 |
| Pennsylvania 11th | Dan Flood (D) | Resigned January 31, 1980 | Ray Musto (D) | April 9, 1980 |
| Louisiana 3rd | Dave Treen (R) | Resigned March 10, 1980, after being elected Governor of Louisiana | Billy Tauzin (D) | May 22, 1980 |
| West Virginia 3rd | John M. Slack Jr. (D) | Died March 17, 1980 | John G. Hutchinson (D) | June 30, 1980 |
| Michigan 13th | Charles Diggs (D) | Resigned June 3, 1980 | George Crockett Jr. (D) | November 4, 1980 |
| New Mexico 2nd | Harold L. Runnels (D) | Died August 5, 1980 | Vacant | Not filled this term |
| Pennsylvania 1st | Michael Myers (D) | Expelled October 2, 1980 | Vacant | Not filled this term |
| South Carolina 6th | John Jenrette (D) | Resigned December 10, 1980 | Vacant | Not filled this term |
| New Jersey 4th | Frank Thompson (D) | Resigned December 29, 1980, after being censured by the House of Representatives | Vacant | Not filled this term |

== Committees ==
Lists of committees and their party leaders for members of the House and Senate committees can be found through the Official Congressional Directory at the bottom of this article. The directory after the pages of terms of service lists committees of the Senate, House (Standing with Subcommittees, Select and Special) and Joint and, after that, House/Senate committee assignments. On the committees section of the House and Senate in the Official Congressional Directory, the committee's members on the first row on the left side shows the chairman of the committee and on the right side shows the ranking member of the committee.

=== Senate ===
- Aging (Special) (Chair: Lawton Chiles)
- Agriculture, Nutrition and Forestry (Chair: Herman Talmadge; Ranking Member: Jesse Helms)
  - Agricultural Research and General Legislation (Chair: Donald Stewart; Ranking Member: Richard G. Lugar)
  - Rural Development (Chair: Patrick Leahy; Ranking Member: Rudy Boschwitz)
  - Foreign Agricultural Policy (Chair: Richard Stone; Ranking Member: Thad Cochran)
  - Nutrition (Chair: George McGovern; Ranking Member: Bob Dole)
  - Environment, Soil Conservation and Forestry (Chair: John Melcher; Ranking Member: Roger W. Jepsen)
  - Agricultural Credit and Rural Electrification (Chair: Edward Zorinsky; Ranking Member: S.I. Hayakawa)
  - Agricultural Production, Marketing and Stabilization of Prices (Chair: Walter "Dee" Huddleston; Ranking Member: Milton Young)
- Appropriations (Chair: Warren Magnuson; Ranking Member: Milton Young)
  - Agriculture and Related Agencies (Chair: Thomas Eagleton; Ranking Member: Thomas F. Eagleton)
  - Defense (Chair: John C. Stennis; Ranking Member: Milton Young)
  - District of Columbia (Chair: Patrick Leahy; Ranking Member: Charles Mathias)
  - Foreign Operations (Chair: Daniel Inouye; Ranking Member: Jake Garn)
  - HUD-Independent Agencies (Chair: William Proxmire; Ranking Member: Charles Mathias)
  - Interior (Chair: Robert Byrd; Ranking Member: Ted Stevens)
  - Labor-Health, Education and Welfare (Chair: Warren Magnuson; Ranking Member: Richard S. Schweiker)
  - Legislative (Chair: Jim Sasser; Ranking Member: Ted Stevens)
  - Military Construction (Chair: Walter "Dee" Huddleston; Ranking Member: Paul Laxalt)
  - Energy and Water Development (Chair: J. Bennett Johnston; Ranking Member: Mark O. Hatfield)
  - State, Justice, Commerce and Judiciary (Chair: Fritz Hollings; Ranking Member: Lowell P. Weicker Jr.)
  - Transportation (Chair: Birch Bayh; Ranking Member: James A. McClure)
  - Treasury, Postal Service and General Government (Chair: Lawton Chiles; Ranking Member: Harrison H. Schmitt)
- Armed Services (Chair: John C. Stennis; Ranking Member: John Tower)
  - Arms Control (Chair: Henry M. Jackson; Ranking Member: William S. Cohen)
  - General Procurement (Chair: Harry F. Byrd Jr.; Ranking Member: Barry Goldwater)
  - Manpower and Personnel (Chair: Sam Nunn; Ranking Member: Roger W. Jepsen)
  - Research and Investigations (Chair: John Culver; Ranking Member: John W. Warner)
  - Military Construction and Stockfiles (Chair: Gary Hart; Ranking Member: Strom Thurmond)
  - Procurement Policy and Reprogramming (Chair: Robert Burren Morgan; Ranking Member: Gordon J. Humphrey)
- Banking, Housing and Urban Affairs (Chair: William Proxmire; Ranking Member: Jake Garn)
  - Housing and Urban Affairs (Chair: Harrison A. Williams; Ranking Member: Jake Garn)
  - Financial Institutions (Chair: Alan Cranston; Ranking Member: John Tower)
  - International Finance (Chair: Adlai Stevenson III; Ranking Member: H. John Heinz III)
  - Rural Housing and Development (Chair: Robert Burren Morgan; Ranking Member: Nancy L. Kassebaum)
  - Economic Stabilization (Chair: Donald Riegle; Ranking Member: Richard G. Lugar)
  - Securities (Chair: Paul Sarbanes; Ranking Member: Richard G. Lugar)
  - Insurance (Chair: Donald Stewart; Ranking Member: Jake Garn)
  - Consumer Affairs (Chair: Paul Tsongas; Ranking Member: William L. Armstrong)
- Budget (Chair: Edmund Muskie, then Fritz Hollings; Ranking Member: Henry Bellmon)
- Commerce, Science and Transportation (Chair: Howard Cannon; Ranking Member: Bob Packwood)
  - Aviation (Chair: Howard Cannon; Ranking Member: Nancy L. Kassebaum)
  - Communications (Chair: Fritz Hollings; Ranking Member: Barry Goldwater)
  - Consumer (Chair: Wendell Ford; Ranking Member: John C. Danforth)
  - Merchant Marine and Tourism (Chair: Daniel Inouye; Ranking Member: John W. Warner)
  - Science, Technology and Space (Chair: Adlai Stevenson III; Ranking Member: Harrison H. Schmitt)
  - Surface Transportation (Chair: Russell B. Long; Ranking Member: Larry Pressler)
- Energy and Natural Resources (Chair: Henry M. Jackson; Ranking Member: Mark O. Hatfield)
  - Energy R&D (Chair: Frank Church; Ranking Member: James A. McClure)
  - Energy Regulation (Chair: J. Bennett Johnston; Ranking Member: Pete Domenici)
  - Energy Conservation and Supply (Chair: John A. Durkin; Ranking Member: Malcolm Wallop)
  - Energy Resources and Materials Production (Chair: Wendell Ford; Ranking Member: Lowell P. Weicker)
  - Parks, Recreations and Renewable Resources (Chair: Dale Bumpers; Ranking Member: Mark O. Hatfield)
- Environment and Public Works (Chair: Jennings Randolph; Ranking Member: Robert T. Stafford)
  - Environmental Pollution (Chair: Edmund Muskie; Ranking Member: Robert T. Stafford)
  - Water Resources (Chair: Mike Gravel; Ranking Member: Pete Domenici)
  - Transportation (Chair: Lloyd Bentsen; Ranking Member: Larry Pressler)
  - Regional and Community Development (Chair: Quentin Burdick; Ranking Member: John H. Chafee)
  - Resource Protection (Chair: John Culver; Ranking Member: Howard H. Baker Jr.)
  - Nuclear Regulation (Chair: Gary Hart; Ranking Member: Alan K. Simpson)
- Ethics (Select) (Chair: Adlai Stevenson III, then Howell Heflin; Ranking Member: Harrison H. Schmitt)
- Finance (Chair: Russell B. Long; Ranking Member: Bob Dole)
  - Health (Chair: Herman Talmadge; Ranking Member: Bob Dole)
  - International Trade (Chair: Abraham Ribicoff; Ranking Member: William V. Roth Jr.)
  - Taxation and Debt Management Generally (Chair: Harry F. Byrd Jr.; Ranking Member: Bob Packwood)
  - Social Security (Chair: Gaylord Nelson; Ranking Member: John C. Danforth)
  - Energy and Foundations (Chair: Mike Gravel; Ranking Member: Malcolm Wallop)
  - Private Pension Plans and Employee Fringe Benefits (Chair: Lloyd Bentsen; Ranking Member: Bob Dole)
  - Tourism and Sugar (Chair: Spark Matsunaga; Ranking Member: Malcolm Wallop)
  - Public Assistance (Chair: Daniel Patrick Moynihan; Ranking Member: H. John Heinz III)
  - Oversight of the Internal Revenue Service (Chair: Max Baucus; Ranking Member: H. John Heinz III)
  - Unemployment and Related Programs (Chair: David Boren; Ranking Member: John H. Chafee)
  - Revenue Sharing, Ingovernmental Revenue Impact and Economic Problems (Chair: Bill Bradley; Ranking Member: David Durenberger)
- Foreign Relations (Chair: Frank Church; Ranking Member: Jacob Javits)
  - International Economic Policy (Chair: Paul Sarbanes; Ranking Member: Jacob Javits)
  - Arms Control, Oceans, International Operations and Environment (Chair: Claiborne Pell; Ranking Member: Charles H. Percy)
  - African Affairs (Chair: George McGovern; Ranking Member: S.I. Hayakawa)
  - European Affairs (Chair: Joe Biden; Ranking Member: Jacob Javits)
  - East Asian and Pacific Affairs (Chair: John Glenn; Ranking Member: Jesse Helms)
  - Near Eastern and South Asian Affairs (Chair: Richard Stone; Ranking Member: Charles H. Percy)
  - Western Hemisphere Affairs (Chair: Edward Zorinsky; Ranking Member: Richard G. Lugar)
- Governmental Affairs (Chair: Abraham Ribicoff; Ranking Member: Charles H. Percy)
  - Permanent Subcommittee on Investigations (Chair: Sam Nunn; Ranking Member: Charles H. Percy)
  - Intergovernmental Relations (Chair: Jim Sasser; Ranking Member: William V. Roth Jr.)
  - Governmental Efficiency and the District of Columbia (Chair: Thomas Eagleton; Ranking Member: Charles Mathias)
  - Energy, Nuclear Proliferation and Federal Services (Chair: Lawton Chiles; Ranking Member: Jacob K. Javits)
  - Civil Service and General Services (Chair: David Pryor; Ranking Member: Ted Stevens)
  - Oversight of Government Management (Chair: Carl Levin; Ranking Member: William S. Cohen)
- Indian Affairs (Select) (Chair: John Melcher)
- Judiciary (Chair: Ted Kennedy; Ranking Member: Strom Thurmond)
  - The Constitution (Chair: Birch Bayh; Ranking Member: Orrin Hatch)
  - Antitrust, Monopoly and Business Rights (Chair: Howard Metzenbaum; Ranking Member: Strom Thurmond)
  - Improvements in Judicial Machinery (Chair: Dennis DeConcini; Ranking Member: Bob Dole)
  - Criminal Justice (Chair: Joe Biden; Ranking Member: Charles Mathias)
  - Administrative Practice and Procedure (Chair: Joe Biden; Ranking Member: Paul Laxalt)
  - Limitations of Contracted and Delegated Authority (Chair: John Culver; Ranking Member: Thad Cochran)
  - Jurisprudence and Governmental Relations (Chair: Howell Heflin; Ranking Member: Alan K. Simpson)
- Intelligence (Select) (Chair: Birch Bayh; Ranking Member: Barry Goldwater)
- Labor and Human Resources (Chair: Harrison A. Williams; Ranking Member: Richard S. Schweiker)
  - Handicapped (Chair: Jennings Randolph; Ranking Member: Robert T. Stafford)
  - Education, Arts and the Humanities (Chair: Claiborne Pell; Ranking Member: Robert T. Stafford)
  - Health and Scientific Research (Chair: Ted Kennedy; Ranking Member: Richard S. Schweiker)
  - Employment, Poverty and Migratory Labor (Chair: Gaylord Nelson; Ranking Member: Jacob K. Javits)
  - Aging (Chair: Thomas Eagleton; Ranking Member: William L. Armstrong)
  - Child and Human Development (Chair: Alan Cranston; Ranking Member: Gordon J. Humphrey)
  - Alcoholism and Drug Abuse (Chair: Donald Riegle; Ranking Member: Orrin G. Hatch)
- Nutrition and Human Needs (Select) (Chair: [data missing]; Ranking Member: [data missing])
- Rules and Administration (Chair: Claiborne Pell; Ranking Member: Mark O. Hatfield)
- Small Business (Select) (Chair: Gaylord Nelson)
- Veterans' Affairs (Chair: Alan Cranston; Ranking Member: Alan K. Simpson)
- Whole

=== House of Representatives ===
- Aging (Select) (Chair: Claude Pepper)
- Agriculture (Chair: Tom Foley; Ranking Member: William C. Wampler)
  - Cotton (Chair: David R. Bowen; Ranking Member: Margaret M. Heckler)
  - Dairy and Poultry (Chair: Alvin Baldus; Ranking Member: Jim Jeffords)
  - Forests (Chair: Jim Weaver; Ranking Member: James P. Johnson)
  - Livestock and Grains (Chair: Charlie Rose; Ranking Member: Keith G. Sebelius)
  - Oilseeds and Rice (Chair: Dawson Mathis; Ranking Member: Paul Findley)
  - Tobacco (Chair: Walter B. Jones Sr.; Ranking Member: Richard Kelly)
  - Conservation and Credit (Chair: Ed Jones; Ranking Member: Edward Madigan)
  - Department Investigations, Oversight and Research (Chair: Kika de la Garza; Ranking Member: William C. Wampler)
  - Domestic Marketing, Consumer Relations and Nutrition (Chair: Fred Richmond; Ranking Member: Steve Symms)
  - Family Farms, Rural Development and Special Studies (Chair: Rick Nolan; Ranking Member: Chuck Grassley)
- Appropriations (Chair: Jamie Whitten; Ranking Member: Silvio O. Conte)
  - Agriculture, Rural Development and Related Agencies (Chair: Jamie Whitten; Ranking Member: Mark Andrews)
  - Defense (Chair: Joseph P. Addabbo; Ranking Member: Jack Edwards)
  - District of Columbia (Chair: Charlie Wilson; Ranking Member: Carl D. Pursell)
  - Energy and Water Development (Chair: Tom Bevill; Ranking Member: John T. Myers)
  - Foreign Operations (Chair: Clarence Long; Ranking Member: Bill Young)
  - HUD-Independent Agencies (Chair: Edward Boland; Ranking Member: Lawrence Coughlin)
  - Interior (Chair: Sidney R. Yates; Ranking Member: Joseph M. McDade)
  - Labor-Health, Education and Welfare (Chair: William Natcher; Ranking Member: Robert H. Michel)
  - Legislative (Chair: Adam Benjamin Jr.; Ranking Member: Robert H. Michel)
  - Military Construction (Chair: K. Gunn McKay; Ranking Member: Robert C. McEwen)
  - State, Justice, Commerce and Judiciary (Chair: K. Gunn McKay; Ranking Member: George M. O'Brien)
  - Transportation (Chair: Robert B. Duncan; Ranking Member: Silvio O. Conte)
  - Treasury, Postal Service and General Government (Chair: Tom Steed; Ranking Member: Clarence E. Miller)
- Armed Services (Chair: Melvin Price; Ranking Member: Bob Wilson)
  - Procurement and Military Nuclear Systems (Chair: Melvin Price; Ranking Member: Bob Wilson)
  - Seapower, Strategic and Critical Materials (Chair: Charles E. Bennett; Ranking Member: Floyd D. Spence)
  - Research and Development (Chair: Richard Howard Ichord Jr.; Ranking Member: William L. Dickinson)
  - Military Personnel (Chair: Richard Crawford White; Ranking Member: Marjorie S. Holt)
  - Investigations (Chair: Samuel S. Stratton; Ranking Member: Robin Beard)
  - Military Installations and Facilities (Chair: Melvin Price; Ranking Member: G. William Whitehurst)
  - Military Compensation (Chair: Bill Nichols; Ranking Member: Donald J. Mitchell)
  - Nato Standardization, Interoperability and Readiness (Chair: Dan Daniel; Ranking Member: William L. Dickinson)
- Assassinations (Select) (Chair: [data missing]; Ranking Member: [data missing])
- Banking, Finance and Urban Affairs (Chair: Henry S. Reuss; Ranking Member: J. William Stanton)
  - The City (Chair: Henry S. Reuss; Ranking Member: Richard Kelly)
  - Housing and Community Development (Chair: Thomas L. Ashley; Ranking Member: J. William Stanton)
  - Economic Stabilization (Chair: William S. Moorhead; Ranking Member: Stewart B. McKinney)
  - Financial Institutions Supervision, Regulation and Insurance (Chair: Fernand St. Germain; Ranking Member: Chalmers P. Wylie)
  - International Development Institutions and Finance (Chair: Henry B. González; Ranking Member: Henry J. Hyde)
  - General Oversight and Renegotiation (Chair: Joseph Minish; Ranking Member: Bill Green)
  - Consumer Affairs (Chair: Frank Annunzio; Ranking Member: Thomas B. Evans Jr.)
  - Domestic Monetary Policy (Chair: Parren Mitchell; Ranking Member: George V. Hansen)
  - Historic Preservation and Coinage (Chair: Stephen L. Neal; Ranking Member: N/A)
  - International Trade, Investment and Monetary Policy (Chair: Stephen L. Neal; Ranking Member: Jim Leach)
- Budget (Chair: Robert Giaimo; Ranking Member: Del Latta)
  - Task Forces (Chair: N/A; Ranking Member: N/A)
  - Economic Policy, Projections and Productivity (Chair: Thomas L. Ashley; Ranking Member: Jim Broyhill)
  - State and Local Governments (Chair: Elizabeth Holtzman; Ranking Member: Marjorie S. Holt)
  - Regulations and Spending Limitations (Chair: Dave Obey; Ranking Member: Del Latta)
  - Inflation (Chair: Paul Simon; Ranking Member: Bud Shuster)
  - Budget Process (Chair: Norman Mineta; Ranking Member: Barber B. Conable Jr.)
  - Defense and International Affairs (Chair: Jim Mattox; Ranking Member: Del Latta)
  - Tax Expenditures and Tax Policy (Chair: James R. Jones; Ranking Member: Jim Broyhill)
  - Human and Community Resources (Chair: Louis Stokes; Ranking Member: Marjorie S. Holt)
  - Legislative Savings (Chair: Leon Panetta; Ranking Member: Del Latta)
- Committees (Select) (Chair: [data missing]; Ranking Member: [data missing])
- Congressional Operations (Select) (Chair: Jack Brooks)
- Crime (Select) (Chair: [data missing]; Ranking Member: [data missing])
- District of Columbia (Chair: Ron Dellums; Ranking Member: Stewart B. McKinney)
  - Fiscal Affairs and Health (Chair: Ron Dellums; Ranking Member: Stewart B. McKinney)
  - Governmental Affairs and Budget (Chair: Walter Fauntroy; Ranking Member: Robert W. Daniel Jr.)
  - Judiciary, Manpower and Education (Chair: Romano Mazzoli; Ranking Member: Marc L. Marks)
  - Metropolitan Affairs (Chair: Pete Stark; Ranking Member: Stewart B. McKinney)
- Education and Labor (Chair: Carl D. Perkins; Ranking Member: John M. Ashbrook)
  - Elementary, Secondary and Vocational Education (Chair: Carl D. Perkins; Ranking Member: William F. Goodling)
  - Labor-Management Relations (Chair: Frank Thompson; Ranking Member: John M. Ashbrook)
  - Employment Opportunities (Chair: Augustus Hawkins; Ranking Member: Jim Jeffords)
  - Postsecondary Education (Chair: William D. Ford; Ranking Member: John Buchanan)
  - Health and Safety (Chair: Joseph M. Gaydos; Ranking Member: Mickey Edwards)
  - Human Resources (Chair: Ike Franklin Andrews; Ranking Member: E. Thomas Coleman)
  - Select Education (Chair: Paul Simon; Ranking Member: Ken Kramer)
  - Labor Standards (Chair: Edward Beard; Ranking Member: John N. Erlenborn)
- Ethics (Select) (Chair: [data missing]; Ranking Member: [data missing])
- Foreign Affairs (Chair: Clement J. Zablocki; Ranking Member: William S. Broomfield)
  - International Security and Scientific Affairs (Chair: Clement J. Zablocki; Ranking Member: William S. Broomfield)
  - International Operations (Chair: Dante Fascell; Ranking Member: John Buchanan)
  - Europe and the Middle East (Chair: Lester L. Wolff; Ranking Member: Paul Findley)
  - Asian and Pacific Affairs (Chair: Lester L. Wolff; Ranking Member: Tennyson Guyer)
  - International Economic Policy and Trade (Chair: Jonathan Brewster Bingham; Ranking Member: Robert J. Lagomarsino)
  - Inter-American Affairs (Chair: Gus Yatron; Ranking Member: Benjamin A. Gilman)
  - Africa (Chair: Stephen Solarz; Ranking Member: William F. Goodling)
  - International Organizations (Chair: Don Bonker; Ranking Member: Edward J. Derwinski)
- Government Operations (Chair: Jack Brooks; Ranking Member: Frank Horton)
  - Legislation and National Security (Chair: Jack Brooks; Ranking Member: Frank Horton)
  - Ingovernmental Relations and Human Resources (Chair: Lawrence H. Fountain; Ranking Member: John W. Wydler)
  - Commerce, Consumer and Monetary Affairs (Chair: Benjamin Stanley Rosenthal; Ranking Member: Lyle Williams)
  - Manpower and Housing (Chair: Cardiss Collins; Ranking Member: Wayne Grisham)
  - Government Activities and Transportation (Chair: John Burton; Ranking Member: Robert S. Walker)
  - Government Information and Individual Rights (Chair: L. Richardson Preyer; Ranking Member: Thomas N. Kindness)
  - Environment, Energy and Natural Resources (Chair: Toby Moffett; Ranking Member: Paul N. McCloskey)
- House Administration (Chair: Frank Thompson, then Lucien Nedzi; Ranking Member: William L. Dickinson)
  - Accounts (Chair: John Brademas; Ranking Member: Samuel L. Devine)
  - Libraries and Memorials (Chair: Lucien Nedzi; Ranking Member: Bill Frenzel)
  - Printing (Chair: Augustus Hawkins; Ranking Member: James C. Cleveland)
  - Personnel and Police (Chair: Frank Annunzio; Ranking Member: Samuel L. Devine)
  - Contracts (Chair: Joseph M. Gaydos; Ranking Member: James C. Cleveland)
  - Services (Chair: Ed Jones; Ranking Member: William L. Dickinson)
  - Office Systems (Chair: Bob Mollohan; Ranking Member: David Stockman)
- House Beauty Shop (Select) (Chair: [data missing]; Ranking Member: [data missing])
- Intelligence (Select) (Chair: Edward Boland; Ranking Member: )
- Insular Affairs (Chair: Mo Udall; Ranking Member: Don H. Clausen)
  - Energy and the Environment (Chair: Mo Udall; Ranking Member: Steve Symms)
  - Water and Power Resources (Chair: Abraham Kazen; Ranking Member: Manuel Lujan Jr.)
  - Public Lands (Chair: John F. Seiberling; Ranking Member: James P. Johnson)
  - National Parks and Insular Affairs (Chair: Phillip Burton; Ranking Member: Keith G. Sebelius)
  - Mines and Mining (Chair: James David Santini; Ranking Member: Don Young)
  - Oversight/Special Investigations (Chair: Harold L. Runnels; Ranking Member: Don H. Clausen)
  - Pacific Affairs (Chair: Antonio Borja Won Pat; Ranking Member: Robert J. Lagomarsino)
- Interstate and Foreign Commerce (Chair: Harley Orrin Staggers; Ranking Member: Samuel L. Devine)
  - Energy and Power (Chair: John Dingell; Ranking Member: Clarence J. Brown)
  - Communications (Chair: Lionel Van Deerlin; Ranking Member: James M. Collins)
  - Oversight and Investigations (Chair: Robert C. Eckhardt; Ranking Member: Norman F. Lent)
  - Consumer Protection and Finance (Chair: James H. Scheuer; Ranking Member: Jim Broyhill)
  - Health and the Environment (Chair: Henry Waxman; Ranking Member: Tim Lee Carter)
  - Transportation and Commerce (Chair: James Florio; Ranking Member: Edward R. Madigan)
- Judiciary (Chair: Peter W. Rodino; Ranking Member: Robert McClory)
  - Immigration, Citizenship and International Law (Chair: Elizabeth Holtzman; Ranking Member: Hamilton Fish IV)
  - Administrative Law and Governmental Relations (Chair: George E. Danielson; Ranking Member: Carlos J. Moorhead)
  - Courts, Civil Liberties and the Administration of Justice (Chair: Robert Kastenmeier; Ranking Member: Thomas F. Railsback)
  - Civil and Constitutional Rights (Chair: Don Edwards; Ranking Member: Henry J. Hyde)
  - Monopolies and Commercial Law (Chair: Peter W. Rodino; Ranking Member: Robert McClory)
  - Crime (Chair: John Conyers; Ranking Member: John M. Ashbrook)
  - Criminal Justice (Chair: Robert Drinan; Ranking Member: Thomas N. Kindness)
- Merchant Marine and Fisheries (Chair: John M. Murphy, then Thomas L. Ashley; Ranking Member: Paul N. McCloskey Jr.)
  - Merchant Marine (Chair: John M. Murphy; Ranking Member: Gene Snyder)
  - Fisheries, Wildlife Conservation and the Environment (Chair: John Breaux; Ranking Member: Edwin B. Forsythe)
  - Coast Guard and Navigation (Chair: Mario Biaggi; Ranking Member: David C. Treen)
  - Oceanography (Chair: Gerry Studds; Ranking Member: Joel Pritchard)
  - Panama Canal (Chair: Carroll Hubbard; Ranking Member: Robert E. Bauman)
- Modernization of House Gallery Facilities (Special) (Chair: __; Ranking Member: __)
- Narcotics Abuse and Control (Select) (Chair: Lester L. Wolff)
- Outer Continental Shelf (Ad Hoc/Select) (Chair: John M. Murphy)
- Post Office and Civil Service (Chair: James M. Hanley; Ranking Member: Edward J. Derwinski)
  - Investigations (Chair: James M. Hanley; Ranking Member: Gene Taylor)
  - Postal Operations and Services (Chair: Charlie Wilson; Ranking Member: Edward J. Derwinski)
  - Postal Personnel and Modernization (Chair: Bill Clay; Ranking Member: Benjamin A. Gilman)
  - Civil Service (Chair: Pat Schroeder; Ranking Member: Jim Leach)
  - Compensations and Employee Benefits (Chair: Gladys Spellman; Ranking Member: Tom Corcoran)
  - Census and Population (Chair: Robert Garcia; Ranking Member: Jim Courter)
  - Human Resources (Chair: Herbert Harris; Ranking Member: Benjamin A. Gilman)
- Public Works and Transportation (Chair: Harold T. Johnson; Ranking Member: Bill Harsha)
  - Aviation (Chair: Glenn M. Anderson; Ranking Member: Gene Snyder)
  - Economic Development (Chair: Robert A. Roe; Ranking Member: John Paul Hammerschmidt)
  - Oversight and Review (Chair: Norman Mineta; Ranking Member: James C. Cleveland)
  - Public Buildings and Grounds (Chair: Elliott H. Levitas; Ranking Member: James Abdnor)
  - Surface Transportation (Chair: James J. Howard; Ranking Member: Bud Shuster)
  - Water Resources (Chair: Ray Roberts; Ranking Member: Don H. Clausen)
- Rules (Chair: Richard Walker Bolling; Ranking Member: Jimmy Quillen)
  - The Legislative Process (Chair: Gillis William Long; Ranking Member: Trent Lott)
  - Rules of the House (Chair: Joe Moakley; Ranking Member: John B. Anderson)
- Science and Technology (Chair: Don Fuqua; Ranking Member: John W. Wydler)
  - Space Science and Applications (Chair: Don Fuqua; Ranking Member: Larry Winn Jr.)
  - Energy Research and Development (Chair: Mike McCormack; Ranking Member: John W. Wydler)
  - Science, Research and Technology (Chair: George Brown Jr.; Ranking Member: Harold C. Hollenbeck)
  - Energy Development and Applications (Chair: Richard Ottinger; Ranking Member: Hamilton Fish IV)
  - Transportation, Aviation and Communication (Chair: Tom Harkin; Ranking Member: Barry M. Goldwater)
  - Investigations and Oversight (Chair: James F. Lloyd; Ranking Member: Manuel Lujan Jr.)
  - Natural Resources and Environment (Chair: Jerome Ambro; Ranking Member: Robert S. Walker)
- Small Business (Chair: Neal Edward Smith; Ranking Member: Joseph M. McDade)
  - SBA and SBIC Authority and General Small Business (Chair: Neal Edward Smith; Ranking Member: Joseph M. McDade)
  - General Oversight and Minority Enterprise (Chair: John J. LaFalce; Ranking Member: Tim Lee Carter)
  - Antitrust and Restraint of Trade Activities affecting Small Businesses (Chair: Berkley Bedell; Ranking Member: Dan Quayle)
  - Impact of Energy Programs, Environment, Safety Requirements and Government Research on Small Business (Chair: Tom Luken; Ranking Member: Silvio O. Conte)
  - Access to Equity Capital and Business Opportunities (Chair: Henry Nowak; Ranking Member: J. William Stanton)
  - Special Small Business Problems (Chair: Marty Russo; Ranking Member: William S. Broomfield)
- Standards of Official Conduct (Chair: Charles E. Bennett; Ranking Member: Floyd Spence)
- Veterans' Affairs (Chair: Ray Roberts; Ranking Member: John Paul Hammerschmidt)
  - Medical Facilities and Benefits (Chair: David E. Satterfield III; Ranking Member: John Paul Hammerschmidt)
  - Compensation, Pension and Insurance (Chair: Sonny Montgomery; Ranking Member: Chalmers P. Wylie)
  - Housing (Chair: Jack Brinkley; Ranking Member: James Abdnor)
  - Education, Training and Employment (Chair: Bill Hefner; Ranking Member: Margaret M. Heckler)
  - Special Investigations (Chair: Ronald M. Mottl; Ranking Member: Elwood Hillis)
- Ways and Means (Chair: Al Ullman; Ranking Member: Barber B. Conable Jr.)
  - Select Revenue Measures (Chair: Dan Rostenkowski; Ranking Member: John Duncan Sr.)
  - Social Security (Chair: J. J. Pickle; Ranking Member: Bill Archer)
  - Health (Chair: Charles Rangel; Ranking Member: Phil Crane)
  - Trade (Chair: Charles Vanik; Ranking Member: Guy Vander Jagt)
  - Public Assistance and Unemployment Compensation (Chair: James C. Corman; Ranking Member: John H. Rousselot)
  - Oversight (Chair: Sam Gibbons; Ranking Member: Willis D. Gradison Jr.)
  - Social Security (Chair: J. J. Pickle; Ranking Member: Bill Archer)
- Whole

=== Joint committees ===
- Economic (Chair: Sen. Lloyd Bentsen; Vice Chair: Rep. Richard Walker Bolling)
- Taxation (Chair: Rep. Al Ullman; Vice Chair: Sen. Russell B. Long)
- The Library (Chair: Sen. Claiborne Pell; Vice Chair: Rep. Lucien N. Nedzi)
- Printing (Chair: Rep. Frank Thompson; Vice Chair: Sen. Claiborne Pell)

== Employees ==
=== Legislative branch agency directors ===
- Architect of the Capitol: George Malcolm White
- Attending Physician of the United States Congress: Freeman H. Cary
- Comptroller General of the United States: Elmer B. Staats
- Director of the Congressional Budget Office: Alice Rivlin
- Librarian of Congress: Daniel J. Boorstin
- Public Printer of the United States: John J. Boyle, until 1980

=== Senate ===
- Chaplain: Edward L. R. Elson (Presbyterian)
- Curator: James R. Ketchum
- Historian: Richard A. Baker
- Parliamentarian: Murray Zweben
- Secretary: J. Stanley Kimmitt
- Librarian: Roger K. Haley
- Sergeant at Arms: Frank "Nordy" Hoffman
- Secretary for the Majority: Walter J. Stewart
- Secretary for the Minority: William Hildenbrand

=== House of Representatives ===
- Chaplain: James D. Ford (Lutheran)
- Clerk: Edmund L. Henshaw Jr.
- Doorkeeper: James T. Molloy
- Parliamentarian: William Holmes Brown
- Reading Clerks: Bob Berry (R), Charles W. Hackney Jr. (D)
- Postmaster: Robert V. Rota
- Sergeant at Arms: Kenneth R. Harding, until February 29, 1980
  - Benjamin J. Guthrie, from March 1, 1980

== See also ==
- List of new members of the 96th United States Congress
- 1978 United States elections (elections leading to this Congress)
  - 1978 United States Senate elections
  - 1978 United States House of Representatives elections
- 1980 United States elections (elections during this Congress, leading to the next Congress)
  - 1980 United States presidential election
  - 1980 United States Senate elections
  - 1980 United States House of Representatives elections
