= Nuclear Safety, Research, Demonstration, and Development Act of 1980 =

United States law

- Long title: An Act to provide for an accelerated and coordinated program of light water nuclear reactor safety research, development and demonstration, to be carried out by the Department of Energy.
- Acronyms (colloquial): NSRDDA, NSRDA
- Nicknames: Nuclear Safety Research and Development Act of 1980
- Enacted by: the 96th United States Congress
- Effective: December 22, 1980

Citations
- Public law: 96-567
- Statutes at Large: 94 Stat. 3329

Codification
- Titles amended: 42 U.S.C.: Public Health and Social Welfare
- U.S.C. sections created: 42 U.S.C. ch. 104 § 9701 et seq.

Legislative history
- Introduced in the House as H.R. 7865 by Mike McCormack (D–WA) on July 30, 1980; Committee consideration by House Science and Technology, Senate Energy and Natural Resources; Passed the House on August 25, 1980 (passed); Passed the Senate on September 26, 1980 (passed, in lieu of S. 2884) with amendment; Senate agreed to Senate amendment on December 12, 1980 (passed) with further amendment; House agreed to Senate amendment on December 13, 1980 (agreed); Signed into law by President Jimmy Carter on December 22, 1980

Nuclear Safety, Research, Demonstration, and Development Act of 1980, 42 U.S.C. § 9701, established nuclear safety policy for nuclear power plants supplying electric energy and electricity generation within the United States. The Act authorized a five-year demonstration program simulating conditions with light water nuclear reactors for the observation of control monitoring and phases of operation for nuclear reactor cores. The U.S. Department of Energy was authorized by the Act of Congress to conduct the nuclear reactor demonstration study while establishing a reactor engineering simulator facility at a United States national laboratory. The nuclear safety demonstration program was to provide research data regarding reactor design and simplification improvements given thermal power station simulations subjecting nuclear reactors to hypothesized calamity and customary operating conditions.

The H.R. 7865 legislation was passed by the 96th U.S. Congressional session and enacted by the 39th President of the United States Jimmy Carter on December 22, 1980.

== Proclamation of the Act ==
=== Congressional Objectives ===
42 U.S.C. Chapter 104 § 9701

(a) Congress finds that —

(1) Nuclear energy is one of the two major energy sources available for electric energy production in the United States during the balance of the 20th century.
(2) Continued development of nuclear power is dependent upon maintaining an extremely high level of safety in the operation of nuclear plants, and on public recognition that these facilities do not constitute a significant threat to human health or safety.
(3) It is the responsibility of utilities, as owners and operators of nuclear powerplants, to assure that such plants are designed and operated safely and reliably.
(4) A proper role of the Federal Government in assuring nuclear powerplant safety, in addition to its regulatory function, is the conduct of a research, development, and demonstration program to provide important scientific and technical information which can contribute to sound design and safe operation of these plants.

(b) It is declared to be the policy of the United States and the purpose of this Act to establish a research, development, and demonstration program for developing practical improvements in the generic safety of nuclear power plants during the next five years, beginning in the fiscal year 1981. The objectives of such program shall be —

(1) To reduce the likelihood and severity of potentially serious nuclear power plant accidents
(2) To reduce the likelihood of disrupting the population in the vicinity of nuclear power plants as the result of nuclear power plant accidents. Nothing in this Act shall be construed as preventing the Secretary from undertaking projects or activities, in addition to those specified in this Act, which appropriately further the purpose and objectives set forth in this Act. Nothing in this Act shall authorize the Secretary to assume responsibility for the management, cleanup or repair of any commercial nuclear power plant. Nothing in this Act shall be construed as limiting the authority of the Secretary under any other law.

=== Definitions ===
42 U.S.C. Chapter 104 § 9702

For the purposes of this Act —
(1) "Secretary" means the Secretary of U.S. Department of Energy
(2) "Government agency" means any department, agency, commission, or independent establishment in the United States federal executive departments, or any corporation, wholly or partly owned by the United States, which is an instrumentality of the United States, or any board, bureau, division, service, office, officer, authority, administration, or other establishment in the executive branch of the Federal Government
(3) "Commission" means the Nuclear Regulatory Commission
(4) "Advisory Committee" means the Advisory Committee on reactor safeguards established by the Atomic Energy Act of 1954

=== Establishment of Research, Development, and Demonstration Program for Improving the Safety of Nuclear Power Plants ===
42 U.S.C. Chapter 104 § 9703

(a) The Secretary shall establish a research, development, and demonstration program to carry out the purpose of this Act. As part of such program, the Secretary shall at a minimum —

(1) Refine further the assessment of risk factors associated with the generic design and operation of nuclear power plants to determine the degree and consequences of propagation of failures of systems, subsystems, and components, including consideration of the interaction between the primary and secondary systems
(2) Develop potentially cost beneficial changes in the generic design and operation of nuclear power plants that can —

(A) Significantly reduce the risks from unintentional release of radioactive material from the various engineered barriers of nuclear power plants
(B) Reduce the radiation exposure to workers during plant operation and maintenance

(3) Develop potentially cost beneficial generic methods and designs that will significantly improve the performance of operators of nuclear power plants under routine, abnormal, and accident conditions
(4) Identify the effect of total or partial automation of generic plant systems on reactor safety, operation, reliability, economics, and operator performance
(5) Conduct further experimental investigations under abnormal operational and postulated accident conditions primarily for light water reactors to determine the consequences of such conditions. These investigations shall include, but not be limited to the following :

(A) Fuel element failure at higher than standard burn-up levels
(B) Fuel cladding interactions
(C) Fuel and cladding interactions with coolant under various temperatures and pressures
(D) Thermohydraulics behavior in the reactor core
(E) Mechanisms to suppress and control the generation of hydrogen gas
(F) Improved instrumentation for monitoring reactor cores
(G) Engineered barrier failure modes
(H) Nuclear fission product release and transport from failed fuel

(6) Provide for the examination and analysis of any nuclear power plant fuel, component, or system which the Secretary deems to offer significant benefit in safety analysis and which is made available to the Secretary for a nominal cost, such as $1: Provided, however. That the Secretary shall accept only the number of samples of such fuel, component, or system necessary to carry out such examination and analysis
(7) Identify the aptitudes, training, and manning levels which are necessary to assure reliable operator performance under normal, abnormal, and emergency conditions.

(b) In carrying out the generic safety research, development, and demonstration program established under this Act, the Secretary —

(1) Shall coordinate with the Commission and, to the extent necessary, enter into a new memorandum of understanding or revise existing memoranda for the purpose of eliminating unnecessary duplication and avoiding programmatic conflict with any reactor safety research program of the Commission, including the Improved Safety Systems Research program
(2) Shall, to the extent practical, coordinate his activities with such other Government agencies, foreign governments, and industry as the Secretary deems appropriate to utilize their expertise, to minimize duplication of effort, and to ensure that information useful for improved concepts applicable to nuclear power plant safety can be applied in a timely manner. The Secretary may enter into agreements and memoranda of understanding to accomplish these ends, but no such agreement shall have the effect of delaying the development and implementation of programs authorized under this Act
(3) Shall utilize, to the extent feasible, underutilized federally owned research reactors and facilities, along with the associated personnel, to maintain existing capabilities and to ensure that the research is generic in nature
(4) Shall make such recommendations as are practical to minimize the complexity of nuclear power plant systems, including secondary systems, and operations

=== National Reactor Engineering Simulator ===
42 U.S.C. Chapter 104 § 9704

(a) The Secretary, in consultation with the Commission and the Advisory Committee, shall initiate a study of the need for and feasibility of establishing a reactor engineering simulator facility at a national laboratory, for the primary purpose of fostering research in generic design improvements and simplifications through the simulation of the performance of various types of light water reactors under a wide variety of abnormal conditions and postulated accident conditions.
(b) In performing the study, the Secretary shall consider relevant factors including, but not limited to —

(1) The potential advantages that would accrue from the establishment of such a facility
(2) The extent to which such a facility would further the generic safety research and development program established by this Act
(3) The extent to which such a facility can be established by nongovernmental entities
(4) The opportunities for cost sharing by nongovernmental entities in the construction and operation of such a facility
(5) The importance of such a facility in emergencies to limit the extent of any future nuclear power plant excursions
(6) The potential for international cooperation in the establishment and operation of such a facility
(7) The appropriate national laboratory for siting such a facility

(c) The Secretary shall, by January 1, 1982, submit to the Committee on Science and Technology of the House of Representatives and the Committee on Energy and Natural Resources of the Senate a report characterizing the study and the resulting conclusions and recommendations.

=== Federal Nuclear Operations Corps ===
42 U.S.C. Chapter 104 § 9705

(a) The Secretary, in cooperation with the Nuclear Regulatory Commission, shall initiate a study as to the sufficiency of efforts in the United States to provide specially trained professionals to operate the controls of nuclear power plants and other facilities in the back-end of the nuclear fuel cycle. In carrying out the study, the Secretary shall coordinate activities with the ongoing programs of the utility industry and other Federal governmental agencies for obtaining high standards of operator performance.
(b) For the purpose of this Act —

(1) In conducting the study the Secretary shall assess the desirability and feasibility of creating a Federal Corps of such professionals to inspect and supervise such operations
(2) The assessment shall consider the establishment of an academy to train Corps professionals in all aspects of nuclear technology, nuclear operations, nuclear regulatory and related law, and health science
(3) The assessment shall include the appropriate organizational approach for the establishment of a Federal Corps within the executive branch

(c) The Secretary shall complete the study within one year after the date of enactment of this Act and shall submit a report along with the Secretary's recommendations to the Congress.

=== Reports and Dissemination of Information ===
42 U.S.C. Chapter 104 § 9706

Secretary shall assure that full and complete safety related information resulting from any project or other activity conducted under this Act is made available in a timely manner to appropriate committees of Congress, Federal, State, and local authorities, relevant segments of private industry, the scientific community, and the public.

=== Comprehensive Program Management Plan ===
42 U.S.C. Chapter 104 § 9707

(a) The Secretary is authorized and directed to prepare a comprehensive program management plan for the conduct of research, development, and demonstration activities under this Act consistent with the provisions of the Program for Improving the Safety of Nuclear Power Plants. In the preparation of such plan, the Secretary shall consult with the Commission and the Advisory Committee and with the heads of such other Government agencies and such public and private organizations as the Secretary deems appropriate.
(b) The Secretary shall transmit the comprehensive program management plan along with any comments by the Commission on the plan to the Committee on Science and Technology of the House of Representatives and the Committee on Energy and Natural Resources and the Committee on Environment and Public Works of the Senate within twelve months after the date of the enactment of this Act. Revisions to the plan shall be transmitted to such committees whenever deemed appropriate by the Secretary.
(c) Concurrently with the submission of the President's annual budget to the Congress for each year after the year in which the comprehensive plan is initially transmitted under subsection (b), the Secretary shall transmit to the Congress a detailed description of the comprehensive plan as then in effect. The detailed description of the comprehensive plan under this subsection shall include, but need not be limited to, a statement setting forth any change in —

(1) The program strategies and plans, including detailed milestone goals to be achieved during the next fiscal year for all major activities and projects
(2) The economic, environmental, and societal significance which the program may have
(3) The total estimated cost of individual program items
(4) The estimated relative financial contributions of the Federal Government and non-Federal participants in the program.

Such description shall also include a detailed justification of any such changes, a description of the progress made toward achieving the goals of this Act, a statement on the status of interagency cooperation in meeting such goals, and any legislative or other recommendations which the Secretary may have to help attain such goal.

=== Authorization of Appropriations ===
42 U.S.C. Chapter 104 § 9708

There is authorized to be appropriated to the Secretary to carry out this Act such sums as may be authorized by legislation hereafter enacted.
Project 78-3-b, authorized by section 102 of Public Law 95-238, the fusion materials irradiation test facility, is hereby designated as the "Mike McCormack Fusion Materials Test Facility". Any reference in any law, regulation, map, record, or other document of the United States to the fusion materials irradiation test facility shall be considered a reference to the "Mike McCormack Fusion Materials Test Facility".

== Nuclear Energy Safety History ==
There have been studies that indicate nuclear energy may be one of the safest methods of energy production, resulting in a net decrease in human deaths.

According to an article published by NASA,

Using historical electricity production data and mortality and emission factors from the peer-reviewed scientific literature, we found that despite the three major nuclear accidents the world has experienced, nuclear power prevented an average of over 1.8 million net deaths worldwide between 1971-2009.

== See also ==
- Boiling water reactor safety systems
- Caesium-137
- Chernobyl disaster
- Chicago Pile-1
- Control rod
- High-level radioactive waste management
- International Nuclear Event Scale
- Nuclear licensing
- Nuclear reactor accidents in the United States
- Nuclear reactor safety systems
- Nuclear safety in the United States
- Passive nuclear safety
- Price–Anderson Nuclear Industries Indemnity Act
- Reactor protection system
- Three Mile Island accident
- Windscale fire
