= 1974–75 United States Senate elections in New Hampshire =

United States senate elections in the state of New Hampshire in 1974 and 1975

The 1974–75 elections for United States Senator in New Hampshire, first held November 5, 1974 and held again September 16, 1975, were part of the longest contested election for the Congress in United States history.

== First regular election: November 1974 ==
1974 United States Senate election in New Hampshire
- November 5, 1974
- Turnout: 53.08%
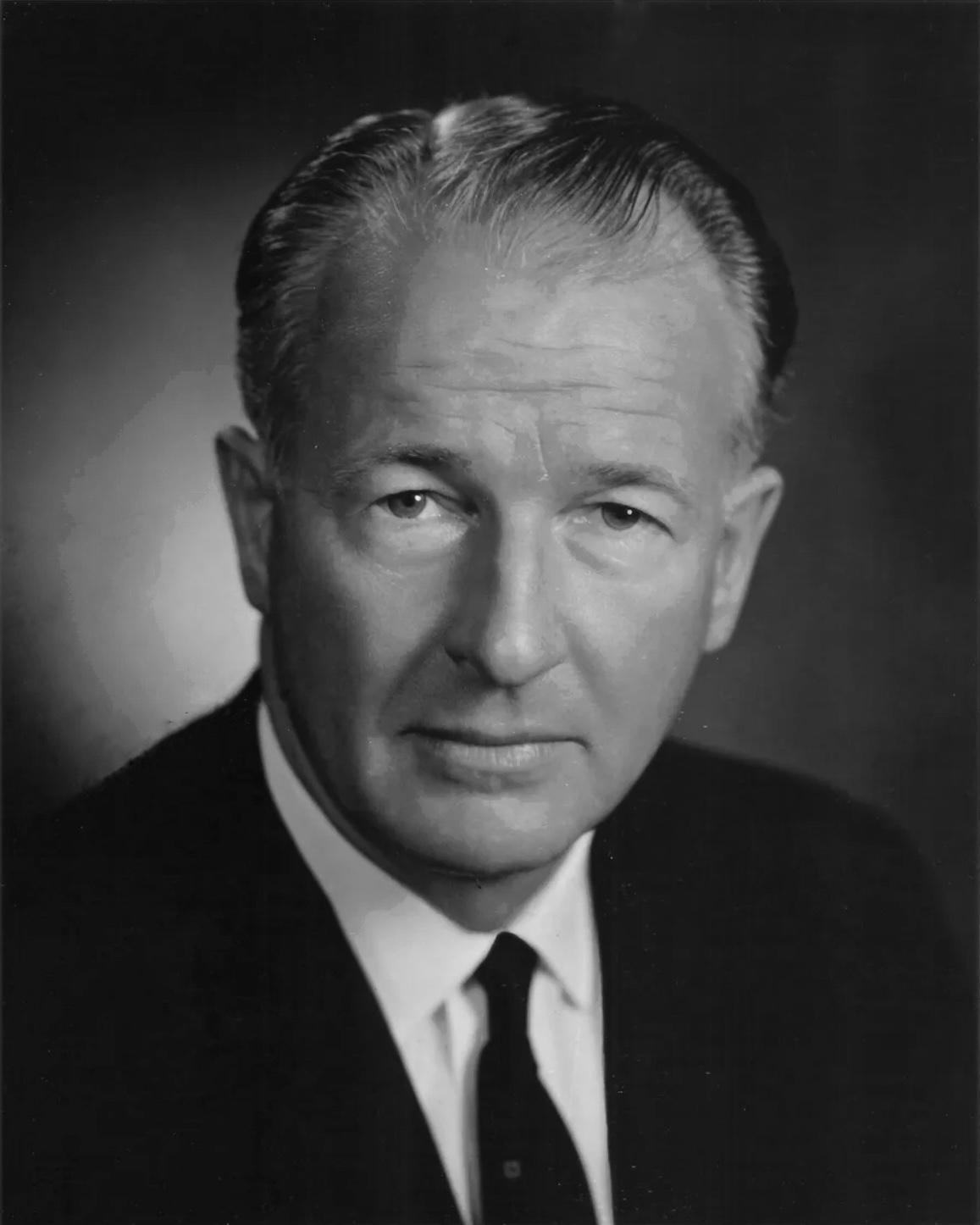

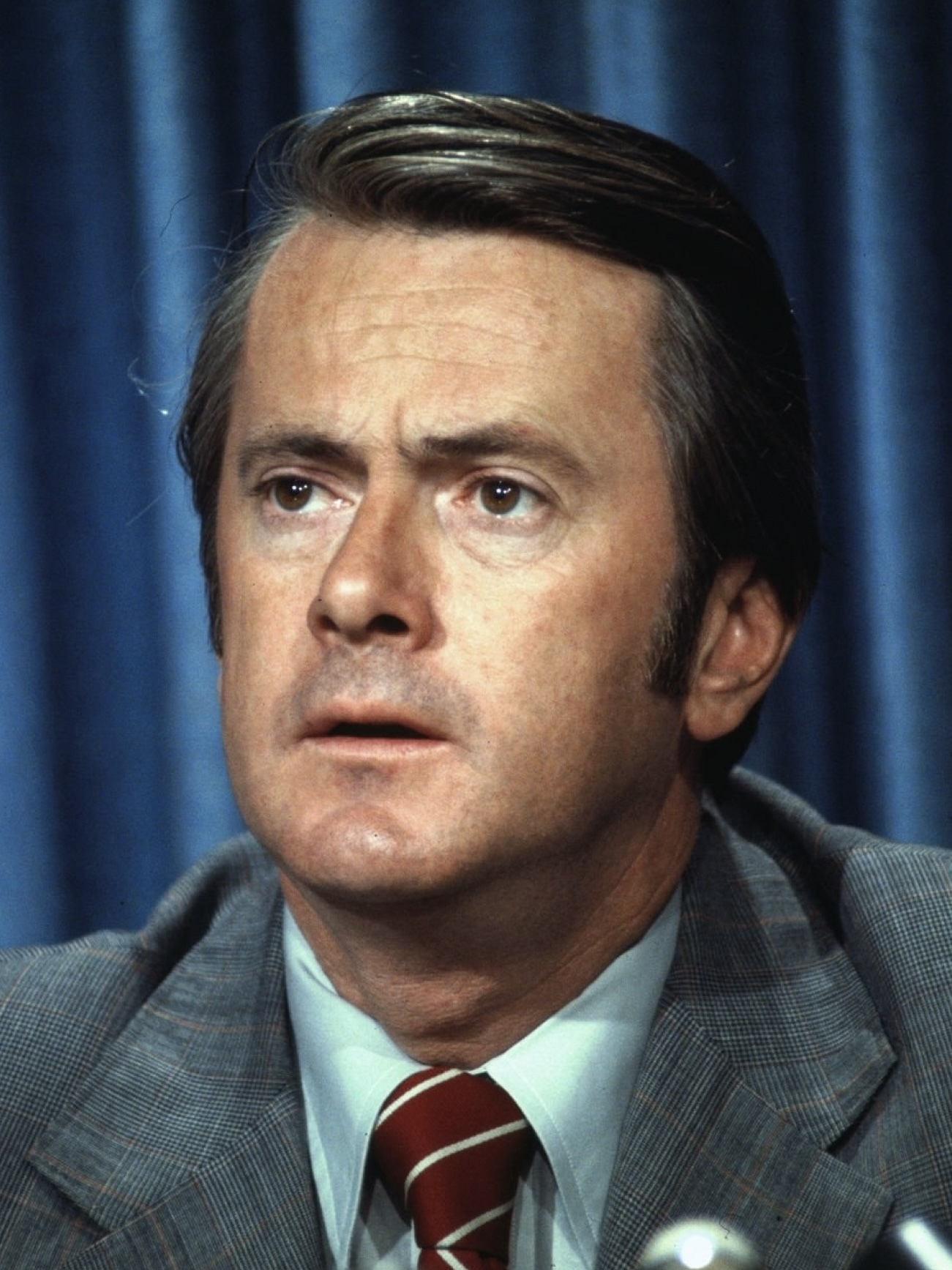
Nominee	Louis C. Wyman	John A. Durkin
Party	Republican	Democratic
Popular vote	110,926	110,924
Percentage	49.662%	49.661%
- Wyman: 40–50% 50–60% 60–70% 70–80% 80–90% Durkin: 40–50% 50–60% 60–70% 70–80% 90–100% No data/vote
U.S. senator before election
Norris Cotton
Republican
Elected U.S. Senator
Election results annulled
Seat declared vacant

In 1974, then-incumbent Senator Norris Cotton announced he would not seek reelection. Republican strategists admitted that it would be tough for their party to hold on to the seat.

The campaign of 1974 pitted Democrat John A. Durkin, who had served as New Hampshire's insurance commissioner and as attorney general, against Republican Louis C. Wyman, a conservative, widely-known member of the United States House of Representatives from New Hampshire's 1st congressional district. As Wyman was the more experienced politician, he was predicted by many to win handily.

Wyman won the initial count with a margin of just 355 votes.

=== Republican primary ===
==== Candidates ====
- Leslie R. Babb
- Louis Wyman, U.S. representative from Manchester

==== Results ====
1974 Republican U.S. Senate primary
Party	Candidate	Votes	%
Republican	Louis Wyman	66,749	82.64%
Republican	Leslie R. Babb	13,670	16.92%
Democratic	John A. Durkin	161	0.20%
Democratic	Laurence Radway	84	0.10%
Democratic	Dennis J. Sullivan	7	0.00%
Write-in		103	0.13%
Total votes		80,774	100.00%

=== Democratic primary ===
==== Candidates ====
- Carmen C. Chimento
- John A. Durkin, former state insurance commissioner and assistant state attorney general
- Laurence Radway, former state representative from Hanover
- Dennis J. Sullivan, mayor of Nashua

==== Results ====
1974 Democratic U.S. Senate primary
Party	Candidate	Votes	%
Democratic	John A. Durkin	22,258	49.81%
Democratic	Laurence Radway	14,646	32.78%
Democratic	Dennis J. Sullivan	6,330	14.17%
American Independent	Carmen Chimento	1,285	2.88%
Republican	Louis Wyman	99	0.22%
Republican	Leslie R. Babb	3	0.00%
Write-in		61	0.14%
Total votes		44,682	100.00%

=== General election ===
==== First recount ====
Durkin immediately demanded a recount. The recount, completed November 27, 1974, declared Durkin the winner by a margin of 10 votes. Republican Governor Meldrim Thomson Jr. awarded Durkin a provisional certificate of election.

==== Second recount ====
Wyman promptly appealed to the New Hampshire State Ballot Law Commission. Durkin tried to defeat the appeal through legal maneuvers that eventually involved all levels of the New Hampshire courts. Durkin's attorney also sought an injunction in federal court to send the matter directly to the U.S. Senate for arbitration, but on December 18, a federal district court denied the request.

The state ballot commission, therefore, conducted its own partial recount, and announced on December 24, 1974, that Wyman had won by just two votes.

1974 New Hampshire United States Senate election, second recount
Party	Candidate	Votes	%
Republican	Louis C. Wyman	110,926	49.662%
Democratic	John A. Durkin	110,924	49.661%
American Independent	Carmen C. Chimento	1,513	0.677%
Plurality		2	0.0009%
Turnout		223,363	

Governor Thomson rescinded Durkin’s certificate, and awarded a new credential to Wyman.

Cotton resigned his Senate seat a few days early on December 31, 1974, and Thomson appointed Wyman to fill the remainder of the term, which would expire on January 3, 1975.

== Election contested in U.S. Senate ==
As a last option, Durkin petitioned the Senate, which had a 60-vote Democratic majority, to review the case, based on the Constitutional provision that each house of Congress is the final arbiter of elections to that body.

On January 13, 1975, the day before the new Congress convened, the Senate Rules Committee tried unsuccessfully to resolve the matter. Composed of five Democrats and three Republicans, the Rules Committee deadlocked 4–4 on a proposal to seat Wyman pending further review. Alabama Democrat James Allen voted with the Republicans on grounds that Wyman had presented proper credentials.

The full Senate took up the case on January 14, with Wyman and Durkin seated at separate tables at the rear of the chamber. Soon, the matter was returned to the Rules Committee, which created a special staff panel to examine 3,500 questionable ballots that had been shipped to Washington. Following this review, the Rules Committee sent a report of 35 disputed points in the election to the full Senate, which spent the next six weeks debating the issue, but resolved only one of the 35 points in dispute. Republicans successfully filibustered the seating of Durkin.

Facing deadlock with the August recess approaching, The Washington Post ran an editorial on July 28 charging that it would be "incredible" if the Senate were to "go on vacation for a month without settling the New Hampshire Senate election case." The Post suggested that Wyman and Durkin themselves should try to reach some agreement to settle the matter. Following up on the suggestion, Louis Wyman wrote to Durkin that day, urging him to support a new, special election. Durkin initially refused, but then on July 29, reversed his earlier position, and announced to a New Hampshire television audience his intention to agree to the new election. The next morning, July 30, he reported this change to the Democratic leadership, thus relieving the Senate from further deliberations on the topic.

Later that same day, the Senate voted 71–21 to declare the seat vacant as of August 8.

Governor Thomson this time appointed former Senator Cotton to hold the seat temporarily. New Hampshire then arranged to hold a special election.

== Special election: September 1975 ==
1975 United States Senate special election in New Hampshire
- September 16, 1975
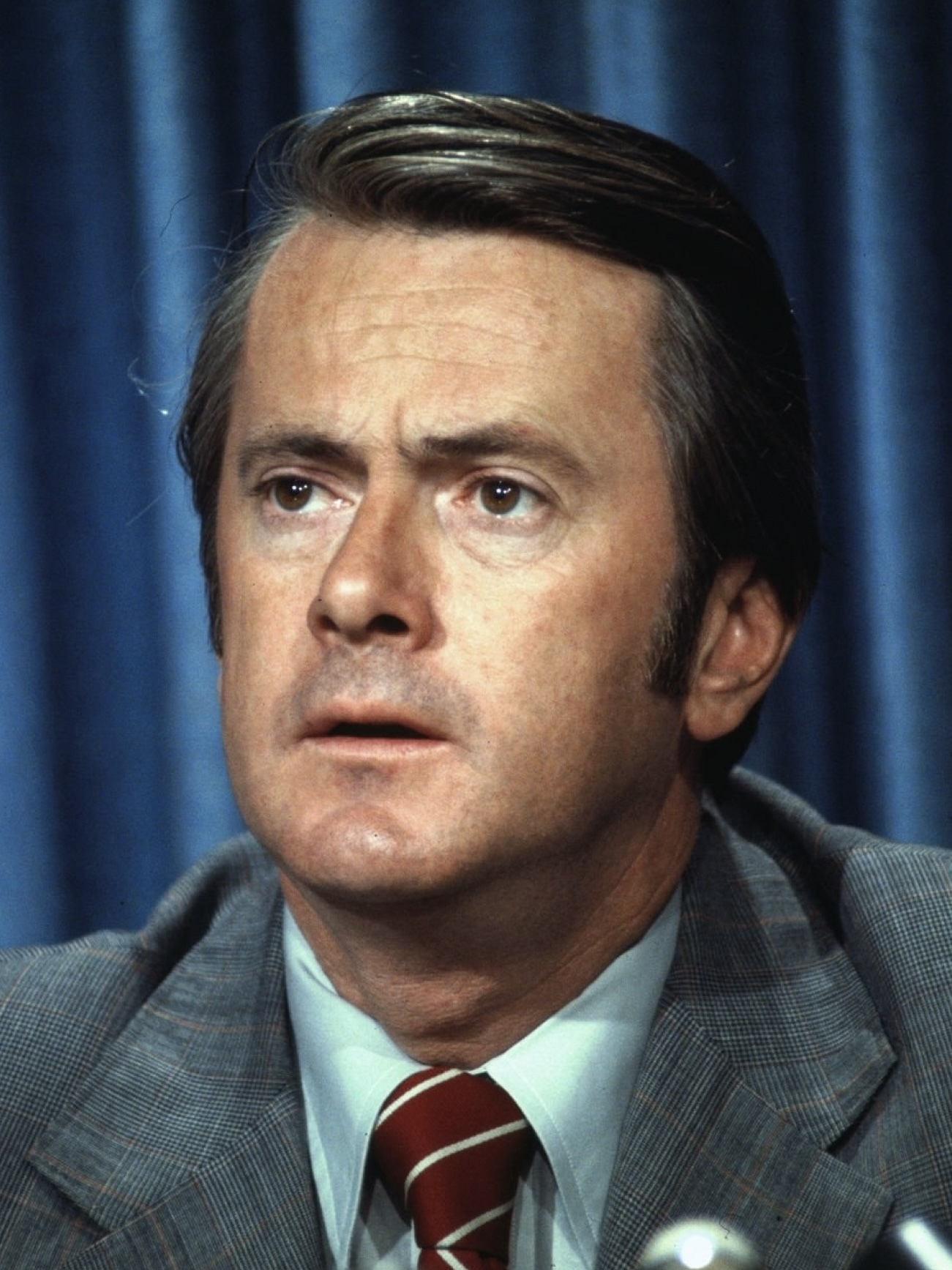

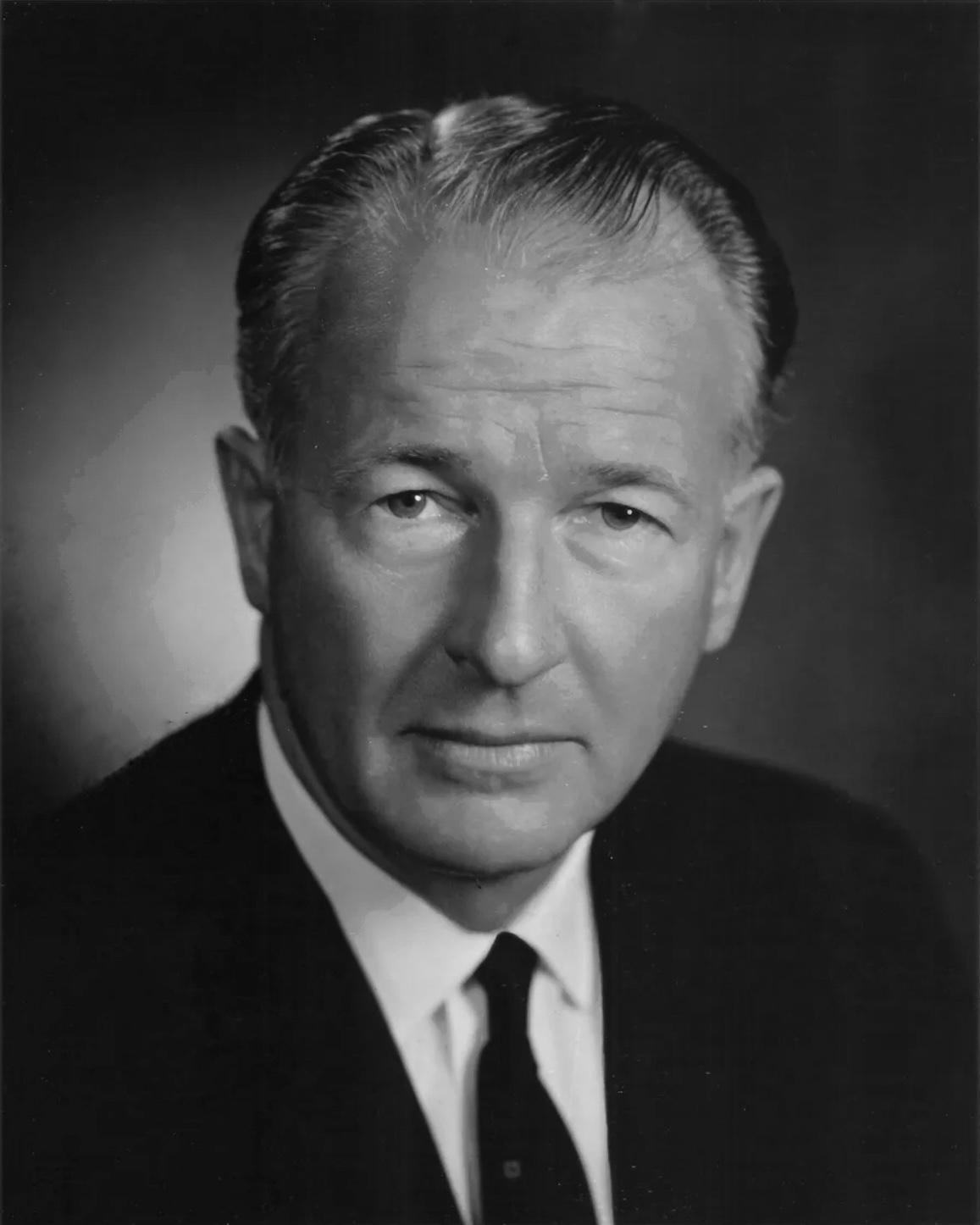
Nominee	John A. Durkin	Louis C. Wyman
Party	Democratic	Republican
Popular vote	140,778	113,007
Percentage	53.62%	43.04%
- County results Durkin: 40–50% 50–60% 60–70% Wyman: 40–50% 60–70%
U.S. senator before election
Norris Cotton
Republican
Elected U.S. Senator
John A. Durkin
Democratic

The special election was held on September 16, 1975. Widespread attention in the media resulted in a record-breaking turnout, which gave the election to Durkin by a 27,771-vote margin. This would be the last time Democrats won the Class 3 Senate seat from New Hampshire until Maggie Hassan's victory in 2016. Democrats would not win any Senate seat in the state until 2008.

1975 United States senate Special election in New Hampshire
Party	Candidate	Votes	%
Democratic	John A. Durkin	140,778	53.62%
Republican	Louis C. Wyman	113,007	43.04%
American Independent	Carmen C. Chimento	8,787	3.35%
Majority		27,771	10.58%
Turnout		262,572	
Democratic gain from Republican			

== See also ==
- 1974 United States Senate elections
- 2008 United States Senate election in Minnesota (a similarly close election that was also disputed in court)
- List of invalidated elections
- List of narrow elections
