= 1980 United States Senate election in New Hampshire =

- November 4, 1980
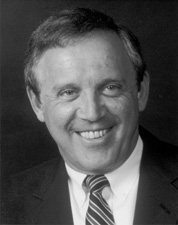

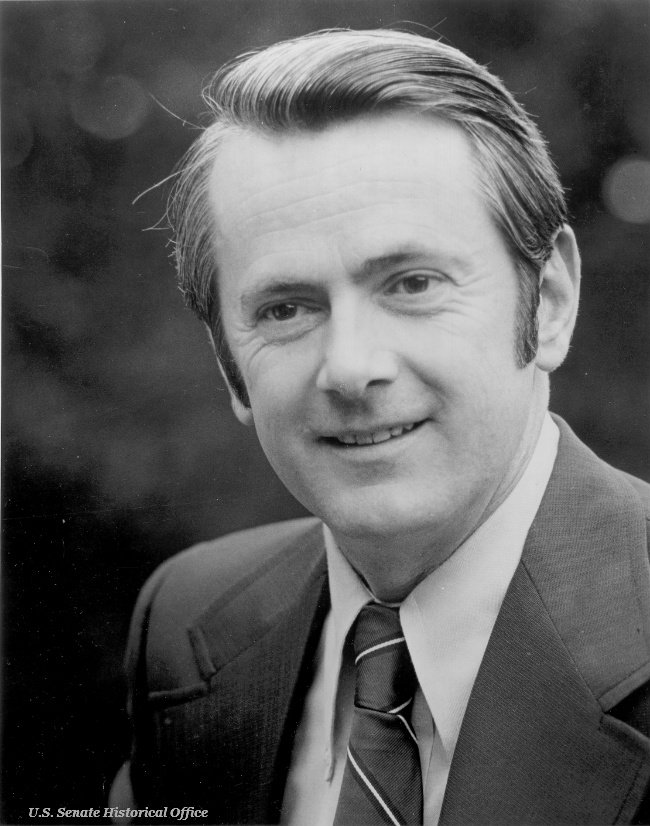
Nominee	Warren Rudman	John Durkin
Party	Republican	Democratic
Popular vote	195,563	179,455
Percentage	52.15%	47.85%
- Rudman: 50–60% 60–70% 70–80% 80–90% Durkin: 50–60% 60–70% 80–90% Tie: 50%
U.S. senator before election
John Durkin
Democratic
Elected U.S. Senator
Warren Rudman
Republican

The 1980 United States Senate election in New Hampshire took place on November 4, 1980. Incumbent Democratic Senator John A. Durkin, who won a contentious do-over election in 1975 following an extremely close election in 1974, ran for re-election to a second term. Former New Hampshire Attorney General Warren Rudman won a crowded Republican primary and faced Durkin in the general election. While Republican presidential nominee Ronald Reagan won the state by a wide margin in the presidential election, Rudman unseated Durkin by a slim margin, winning 52% of the vote to Durkin's 48%. After Durkin's loss, no Democrat would be elected to the Senate from the state until 2008.

== Democratic primary ==
=== Candidates ===
- John A. Durkin, incumbent U.S. Senator
- William F. Sullivan, disabled veteran

=== Results ===
Democratic primary results
Party	Candidate	Votes	%
Democratic	John A. Durkin (inc.)	37,059	78.79%
Democratic	William F. Sullivan	9,486	20.17%
Democratic	Write-ins	489	1.04%
Total votes		47,034	100.00%

== Republican primary ==
=== Candidates ===
- Warren Rudman, former New Hampshire Attorney General
- John Sununu, former State Representative, Tufts University professor
- Wesley Powell, former Governor of New Hampshire
- Edward B. Hager, physician
- Lawrence J. Brady, former Deputy Director of the Office of Export Enforcement
- David H. Bradley, former State Senator
- Anthony Campaigne, businessman
- George B. Roberts, Jr., Speaker of the New Hampshire House of Representatives
- Robert Marvel, retired United States Navy commander
- E. J. Smith, encyclopedia salesman
- Carmen Chimento, 1974 and 1975 American Independent Party nominee for the U.S. Senate

=== Results ===
Republican primary results
Party	Candidate	Votes	%
Republican	Warren Rudman	20,206	20.27%
Republican	John Sununu	16,885	16.94%
Republican	Wesley Powell	14,861	14.91%
Republican	Edward B. Hager	9,821	9.85%
Republican	Lawrence J. Brady	9,426	9.46%
Republican	David H. Bradley	9,361	9.39%
Republican	Anthony Campaigne	8,495	8.52%
Republican	George B. Roberts, Jr.	7,397	7.42%
Republican	Robert Marvel	1,475	1.48%
Republican	E. J. Smith	1,166	1.17%
Republican	Carmen C. Chimento	502	0.50%
Republican	Write-ins	78	0.08%
Total votes		99,673	100.00%

== General election ==
=== Results ===
1980 United States Senate election in New Hampshire
Party	Candidate	Votes	%	±%
Republican	Warren Rudman	195,563	52.15%	+9.11%
Democratic	John A. Durkin (inc.)	179,455	47.85%	−5.76%
Majority		16,108	4.30%	−6.28%
Total votes		375,018	100.00%	
Republican gain from Democratic				

== See also ==
- 1980 United States Senate elections
