= Laurence Radway =

American politician

Member of the New Hampshire House of Representatives from the Chesire 9th district
- In office 1970–1972

Personal details
- Born: February 2, 1919 Staten Island, New York, U.S.
- Died: May 7, 2003 (aged 84) Lebanon, New Hampshire, U.S.
- Party: Democratic
- Education: Harvard College; University of Minnesota

Laurence Radway was a Democratic politician who served in the New Hampshire House of Representatives from 1970 to 1972, where he represented the Chesire 9th district. He was also a professor of government at Dartmouth College.
