= John A. Durkin =

American politician (1936–2012)

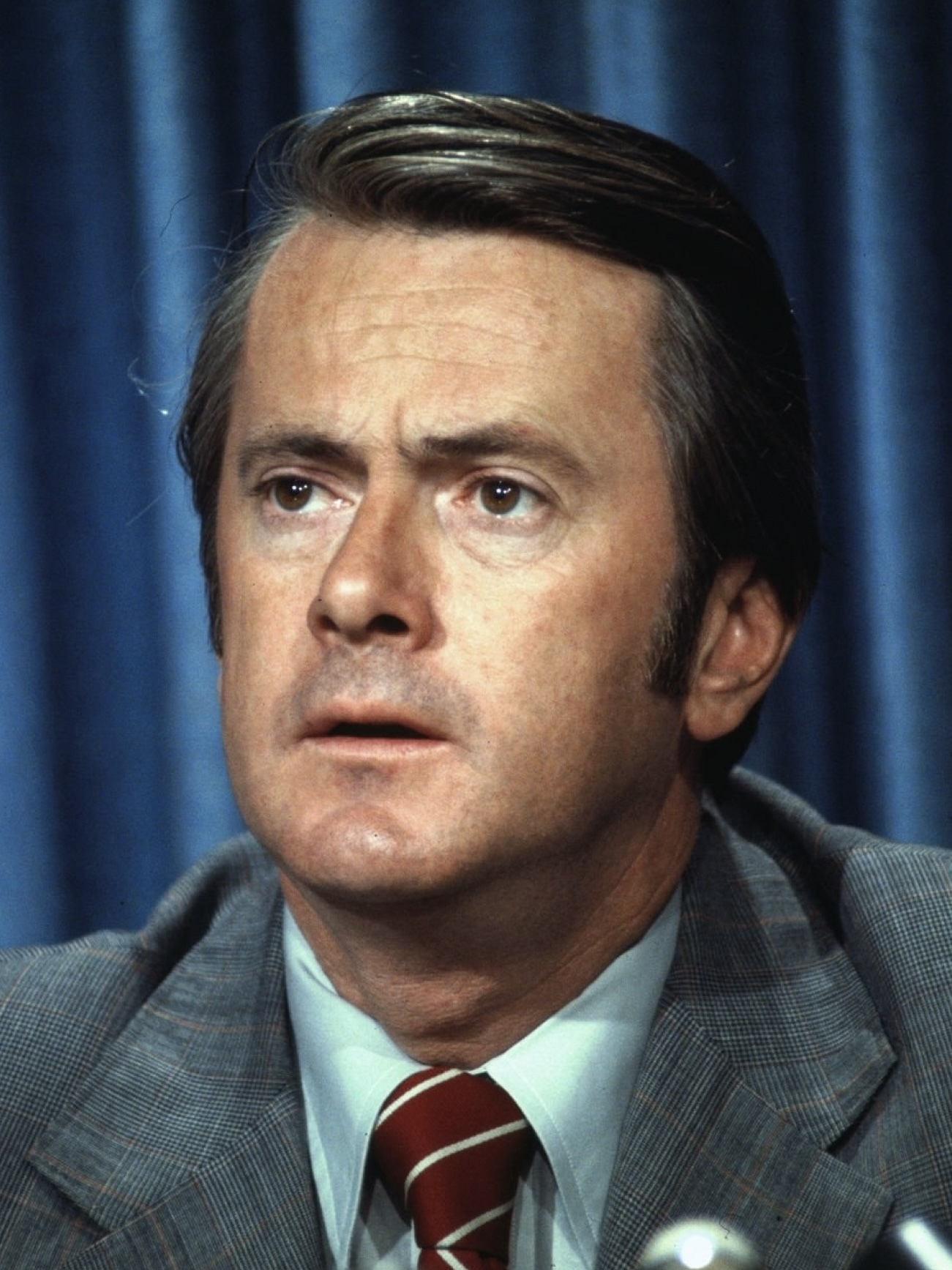
- Durkin in 1975

United States Senator from New Hampshire
- In office September 18, 1975 – December 29, 1980
- Preceded by: Norris Cotton
- Succeeded by: Warren Rudman

Personal details
- Born: John Anthony Durkin; March 29, 1936 Brookfield, Massachusetts, U.S.
- Died: October 16, 2012 (aged 76) Franklin, New Hampshire, U.S.
- Resting place: Arlington National Cemetery
- Party: Democratic
- Spouse: Patricia Durkin (Divorced)
- Children: 3
- Education: College of the Holy Cross (BS); Georgetown University (JD)

Military service
- Allegiance: United States
- Branch/service: United States Navy
- Years of service: 1959–1961
- Rank: Lieutenant

John Anthony Durkin (March 29, 1936 – October 16, 2012) was an American politician and lawyer who served as a U.S. Senator from New Hampshire from 1975 until 1980. He was a member of the Democratic Party.

== Early life and education ==
John Anthony Durkin was born on March 29, 1936, in Brookfield, Massachusetts, the youngest of four children. He was raised in Brookfield, and, according to a later memorial published by the New Hampshire Bar Association, his parents regarded the priesthood as the highest calling in life, with politics second. Durkin entered electoral politics while still a teenager; at age 18, he was elected moderator of the Brookfield town meeting, his first elective office.

Durkin attended St. John's High School in Worcester, Massachusetts, graduating in 1954. As a high school student, he played outfield for the baseball team and was a member of the varsity football squad. After high school, he then graduated from the College of the Holy Cross with a Bachelor of Science in 1959. As an undergraduate at Holy Cross, he was member of its Naval Reserve Officers Training Corps (NROTC) program. He subsequently was commissioned into the United States Naval Reserve, becoming a surface warfare officer and spending two years on active duty from 1959 to 1961. He ultimately attained the rank of lieutenant commander.

Following his naval service, Durkin earned a Juris Doctor (J.D.) from the Georgetown University Law Center in 1965. He then worked for the Office of the Comptroller of the Currency before moving to New Hampshire in 1966. That year, he was admitted to the bars of both Massachusetts and New Hampshire and began practicing law in Concord, New Hampshire. He joined the office of the New Hampshire Attorney General in 1966 and served as an assistant attorney general from 1967 to 1968. In 1968, Durkin was appointed New Hampshire's insurance commissioner, serving until 1973; in that position, he attracted public attention for confronting insurance companies over issues affecting consumers.

== United States Senate ==
=== 1974 and 1975 Senate election ===
In 1974, Durkin won the Democratic nomination for the Senate being vacated by the retiring 20-year Republican incumbent, Norris Cotton. In the November 5 general election Durkin appeared to have lost against Republican Congressman Louis Wyman by 355 votes. Durkin requested a recount, which resulted in his victory by 10 votes. Governor Meldrim Thomson then certified Durkin as the winner. Wyman then requested a second recount, in which he prevailed by two votes. Senator Cotton resigned on December 31, 1974, and Gov. Thomson appointed Wyman for the balance of the term ending January 3, 1975, a common practice intended to give an incoming senator an advantage in seniority. Most thought this ended the disputed election, but Durkin appealed to the full United States Senate, which is the final arbiter of Senate elections under the Constitution.

The Senate Rules Committee deadlocked on whether to seat Wyman for the 1975–1981 term, and sent the question to the full Senate. On January 14, 1975, the Senate returned the matter to the Rules Committee, which again returned it to the full Senate, enumerating 35 disputed points that questioned the election based on 3,000 questionable ballots. The full Senate was still unable to break the deadlock on even one of the 35 points. After seven months and six unsuccessful attempts by Democratic senators to seat Durkin, and much media attention in the New Hampshire press, Wyman proposed that he and Durkin run again in a special election. Durkin agreed, and the Senate declared the seat vacant on August 8, 1975, pending the outcome of the new election. In the meantime, Thomson again appointed Cotton as a caretaker until the new election was held. In the September 16, 1975, special election, Durkin defeated Wyman by over 27,000 votes. (54%-43%)

When asked about the experience of going through such a long-contested election many years later in 2008, Durkin told The Associated Press that he wouldn't wish the experience on his worst enemy. "I'd much rather have read about it than have lived it," he said. Having initially resisted the idea of holding a special election to resolve the matter, Durkin recalled in 2008 that it was eventually his daughter, 8 years old at the time, who helped change his mind: "She said, 'Dad, don't you realize they can't make their mind up about anything?'," Durkin said. "When the kids realize it, I thought I had to do something."

=== Highlights of Senate service ===
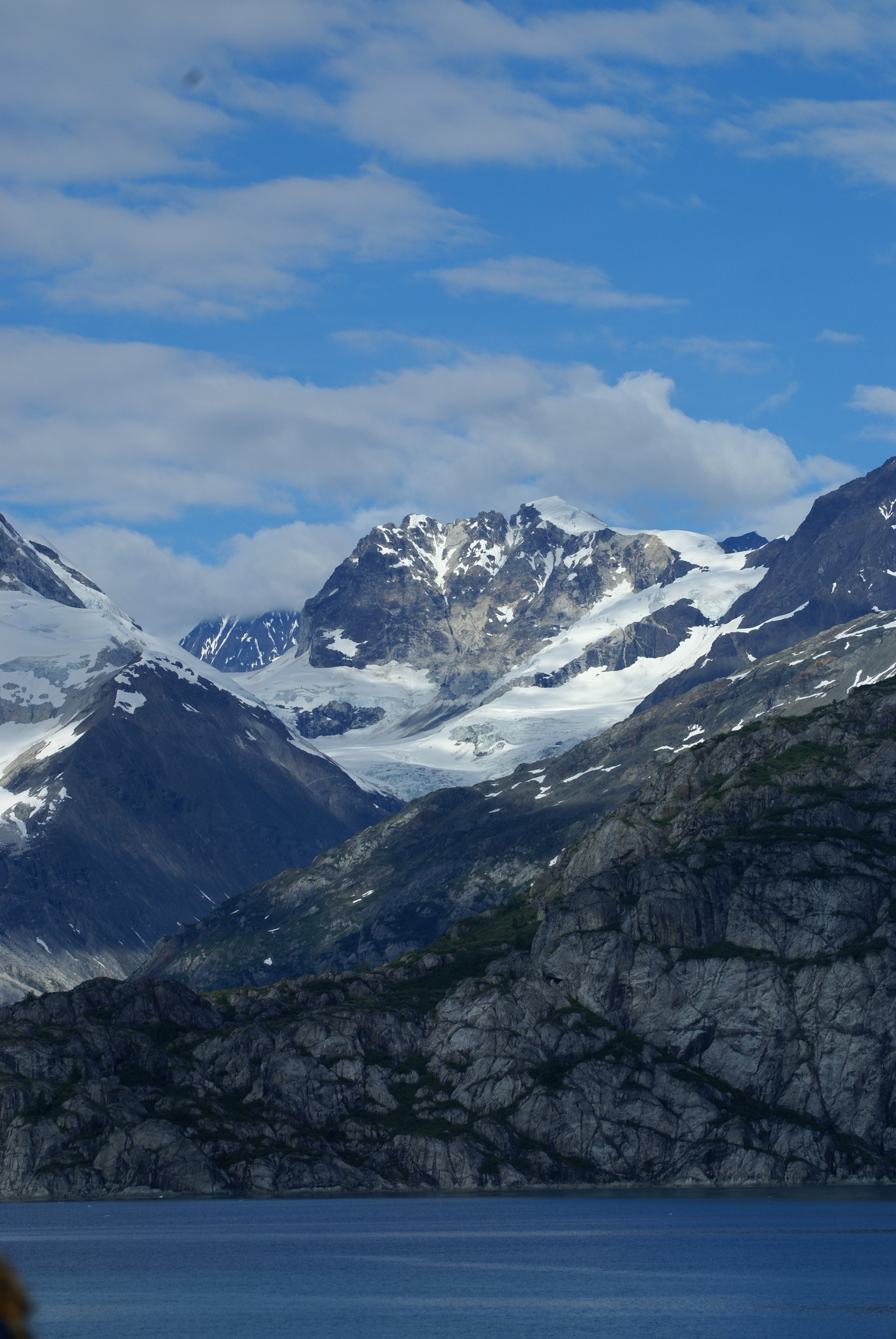
Glacier Bay National Park and Preserve in Alaska

For the first four years of his term, Durkin served alongside fellow Democrat Thomas J. McIntyre. This was the first time New Hampshire had been represented by two Democratic senators since prior to the Civil War. As a member of the senate Veterans Affairs Committee, Durkin authored a successful amendment to the 1976 Veterans Affairs Authorization, which extended GI Bill benefits to veterans of the recently concluded Vietnam War. Other highlights of his Senate career included his work on energy independence, alternative energy sources, and preserving Federal lands in Alaska for future generations. Durkin called for a Senate investigation into the International Brotherhood of Teamsters pension fund and its apparent ties to underworld crime. Durkin introduced an amendment to the Federal Election Campaign Act (FECA), which would have provided public financing of campaigns by providing free television and radio time, postage, and telephone service to all bona fide congressional candidates.

Working as a key Senate supporter of the legislation, and in coordination with staff of then Secretary of the Interior Cecil D. Andrus, Durkin played a key role in helping achieve successful passage of the Alaska Lands Act, enacted in 1980.

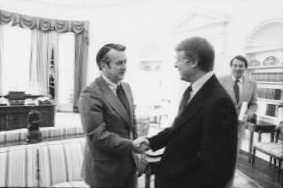
Durkin meeting with President Jimmy Carter in the Oval Office, 1978

In 1976, the United States Coast Guard attempted to assert jurisdiction over two of New Hampshire's interior waterways, Lake Winnisquam and Lake Winnipesaukee, on the grounds that they could be navigated via the Merrimack River, which empties into the Atlantic Ocean. Durkin led the successful Congressional effort to prevent the takeover, arguing that New Hampshire's government provided more effective oversight than the federal government could, and that the state government could not withstand the loss of revenue from boat registration fees.

=== 1980 and 1990 Senate elections ===
Durkin was defeated in his 1980 Senate re-election bid by former state Attorney General Warren Rudman. He resigned early, six days before the end of his term, so Rudman could be appointed and gain a seniority advantage over other senators elected in 1980. Durkin resumed the practice of law and resided in Manchester. He sought New Hampshire's other Senate seat in 1990, but was defeated by Republican Congressman Bob Smith.

== Death ==
In his later years Durkin resided at the New Hampshire Veterans Home, battling various ailments. He died on October 16, 2012, at Franklin Regional Hospital in Franklin, New Hampshire, aged 76. He had three children: John, Andrea and Sheilagh. He was interred at Arlington National Cemetery.

Party political offices
Preceded by John King	Democratic nominee for U.S. Senator from New Hampshire (Class 3); 1974, 1975, 1980	Succeeded by Endicott Peabody
Preceded by Norman D'Amours	Democratic nominee for U.S. Senator from New Hampshire (Class 2); 1990	Succeeded by Richard Swett
U.S. Senate
Preceded by Norris Cotton	U.S. Senator (Class 3) from New Hampshire; 1975–1980; Served alongside: Thomas McIntyre, Gordon Humphrey	Succeeded by Warren Rudman
