= List of new members of the 95th United States Congress =

The 95th United States Congress began on January 3, 1977. There were 11 new senators (six Democrats, five Republicans) and 64 new representatives (45 Democrats, 19 Republicans), as well as one new delegate (a Democrat), at the start of the first session. Additionally, 12 senators (six Democrats, six Republicans) and six representatives (two Democrats, four Republicans) took office on various dates in order to fill vacancies during the 95th Congress before it ended on January 3, 1979.

== Senate ==
=== Took office January 3, 1977 ===
State	Image	Senator	Seniority	Switched party	Prior background	Birth year	Ref
Arizona		Dennis DeConcini (D)	8th (97th overall)	Yes; Open seat; replaced Paul Fannin (R)	Pima County Attorney; U.S. Army Judge Advocate General's Corps	1937	
Hawaii		Spark Matsunaga (D)	1st (90th overall)	Yes; Open seat; replaced Hiram Fong (R)	U.S. House of Representatives (Note: Elected to the 88th Congress, serving from 1963 to 1971 in Hawaii's at-large district and from 1971 to 1977 in 1st district.); Hawaii Territorial Legislature; U.S. Army Captain	1916	
Indiana		Richard Lugar (R)	6th (95th overall)	Yes; Defeated Vance Hartke (D)	Mayor of Indianapolis; U.S. Navy Lieutenant	1932	
Maryland		Paul Sarbanes (D)	4th (93rd overall)	Yes; Defeated J. Glenn Beall Jr. (R)	U.S. House of Representatives (Note: Elected to the 92nd Congress, serving from 1971 to 1973 in Maryland's 4th district and from 1973 to 1977 in 3rd district.); Maryland House of Delegates	1933	
Montana (Class 1)		John Melcher (D)	2nd (91st overall)	No; Open seat; replaced Mike Mansfield (D)	U.S. House of Representatives (Note: Elected to the 91st Congress, serving from 1969 to 1977 in Montana's 2nd district.); U.S. Army	1924	
New Mexico		Harrison Schmitt (R)	10th (99th overall)	Yes; Defeated Joseph Montoya (D)	NASA astronaut Geologist	1935	
New York		Daniel Patrick Moynihan (D)	5th (94th overall)	Yes; Defeated James L. Buckley (R)	U.S. Ambassador to the United Nations; U.S. Ambassador to India; Counselor to President Richard Nixon; U.S. Assistant Secretary of Labor	1927	
Pennsylvania		John Heinz (R)	3rd (92nd overall)	No; Open seat; replaced Hugh Scott (R)	U.S. House of Representatives (Note: Elected to the 92nd Congress, serving from 1971 to 1977 in Pennsylvania's 18th district.); Air Force Reserve Command	1938	
Tennessee		Jim Sasser (D)	7th (96th overall)	Yes; Defeated Bill Brock (R)	Lawyer; U.S. Marine Corps Reserve	1936	
Utah		Orrin Hatch (R)	9th (98th overall)	Yes; Defeated Frank Moss (D)	Lawyer	1934	
Wyoming (Class 1)		Malcolm Wallop (R)	11th (100th overall)	Yes; Defeated Gale W. McGee (D)	Wyoming Senate; Wyoming House of Representatives; U.S. Army	1933	

=== Took office during the 95th Congress ===
State	Image	Senator	Took office	Switched party	Prior background	Birth year	Ref
Arkansas		Kaneaster Hodges Jr. (D)	December 10, 1977	No; Appointed; replaced John L. McClellan (D)	Arkansas Game and Fish Commission; Newport City Attorney	1938	
Montana (Class 2)		Paul G. Hatfield (D)	January 22, 1978	No; Appointed; replaced Lee Metcalf (D)	Montana Supreme Court; Montana District Court Judge	1928	
Minnesota (Class 1)		Muriel Humphrey (DFL)	January 25, 1978	No; Appointed; replaced Hubert Humphrey (DFL)	Second Lady of the United States; First Lady of Minneapolis	1912	
Alabama		Maryon Pittman Allen (D)	June 8, 1978	No; Appointed; replaced James Allen (D)	Journalist	1925	
Minnesota (Class 1)		David Durenberger (R)	November 8, 1978	Yes; Open seat; replaced Muriel Humphrey (DFL)	Lawyer; U.S. Army	1934	
Alabama		Donald Stewart (D)	November 8, 1978	No; Defeated Maryon Pittman Allen (D) in a primary	Alabama Senate; Alabama House of Representatives; U.S. Magistrate Judge; U.S. Army	1940	
Montana (Class 2)		Max Baucus (D)	December 15, 1978	No; Defeated Paul G. Hatfield (D) in a primary	U.S. House of Representatives (Note: Elected to the 94th Congress, serving from 1975 to 1978 in Montana's 1st district.); Montana House of Representatives	1941	
Kansas		Nancy Kassebaum (R)	December 23, 1978	No; Open seat; replaced James B. Pearson (R)	Radio station executive	1932	
Mississippi		Thad Cochran (R)	December 27, 1978	Yes; Open seat; replaced James Eastland (D)	U.S. House of Representatives (Note: Elected to the 93rd Congress, serving from 1973 to 1978 in Mississippi's 4th district.); U.S. Navy Ensign	1937	
Minnesota (Class 2)		Rudy Boschwitz (R)	December 30, 1978	Yes; Defeated Wendell R. Anderson (DFL)	Retail businessman U.S. Army Signal Corps	1930	
Wyoming (Class 2)		Alan Simpson (R)	January 1, 1979	No; Open seat; replaced Clifford Hansen (R)	Wyoming House of Representatives; U.S. Army Second Lieutenant	1931	
Virginia		John Warner (R)	January 2, 1979	No; Open seat; replaced William L. Scott (R)	U.S. Secretary of the Navy; U.S. Under Secretary of the Navy; Assistant U.S. Attorney; U.S. Marine Corps Captain	1927	

== House of Representatives ==
=== Took office January 3, 1977 ===
District	Representative	Switched party	Prior background	Birth year	Ref
Alabama 5	Ronnie Flippo (D)	No	State Senator	1937	
Arizona 3	Bob Stump (D)	Yes (Note: Stump joined the Republican Party in January 1983, at the start of the 98th Congress.)	State Senator	1927	
Arizona 4	Eldon Rudd (R)	No	County Supervisor	1920	
Arkansas 2	Jim Guy Tucker (D)	No	Arkansas Attorney General	1943	
California 16	Leon Panetta (D)	Yes	Office for Civil Rights Director	1938	
California 23	Anthony Beilenson (D)	No	State Senator	1932	
California 27	Bob Dornan (R)	No	Actor	1933	
California 40	Robert Badham (R)	No	State Assemblyman	1929	
Delaware at-large	Thomas B. Evans Jr. (R)	No	RNC Co-chair	1931	
Florida 8	Andy Ireland (D)	No (Note: Ireland joined the Republican Party in July 1984, during the 98th Congress.)	Banker	1930	
Georgia 8	Billy Lee Evans (D)	No	State Representative	1941	
Georgia 9	Ed Jenkins (D)	No	Assistant U.S. Attorney	1933	
Georgia 10	Doug Barnard Jr. (D)	No	GDOT board member	1922	
Hawaii 1	Cecil Heftel (D)	No	Radio broadcaster	1924	
Hawaii 2	Daniel Akaka (D)	No	DHEW official	1924	
Illinois 15	Tom Corcoran (R)	Yes	Legislative staffer	1939	
Indiana 1	Adam Benjamin Jr. (D)	No	State Senator	1935	
Indiana 4	Dan Quayle (R)	Yes	Lawyer	1947	
Indiana 8	David L. Cornwell (D)	No	U.S. Army	1945	
Iowa 1	Jim Leach (R)	Yes	U.S. Foreign Service officer	1942	
Kansas 4	Dan Glickman (D)	Yes	School Board Member	1944	
Louisiana 1	Richard A. Tonry (D)	No	State Representative	1935	
Louisiana 5	Jerry Huckaby (D)	No	Management executive	1941	
Maryland 3	Barbara Mikulski (D)	No	City Councillor	1936	
Maryland 8	Newton Steers (R)	No	State Senator	1917	
Michigan 2	Carl Pursell (R)	No	State Senator	1932	
Michigan 4	David Stockman (R)	No	Congressional staffer	1946	
Michigan 5	Harold S. Sawyer (R)	Yes	Prosecutor	1920	
Michigan 7	Dale Kildee (D)	No	State Senator	1929	
Michigan 12	David Bonior (D)	No	State Representative	1945	
Minnesota 4	Bruce Vento (DFL)	No	State Representative	1940	
Missouri 2	Robert A. Young (D)	No	State Senator	1923	
Missouri 3	Dick Gephardt (D)	No	Alderman	1941	
Missouri 4	Ike Skelton (D)	No	State Senator	1931	
Missouri 9	Harold Volkmer (D)	No	State Representative	1931	
Montana 2	Ron Marlenee (R)	Yes	Rancher	1935	
Nebraska 2	John Joseph Cavanaugh III (D)	Yes	State Senator	1945	
New Jersey 9	Harold C. Hollenbeck (R)	Yes	State Senator	1938	
New Jersey 14	Joseph A. LeFante (D)	No	State Assemblyman	1928	
New York 20	Ted Weiss (D)	No	City Councillor	1927	
New York 23	Bruce F. Caputo (R)	No	State Assemblyman	1943	
North Carolina 3	Charles Orville Whitley (D)	No	Congressional staffer	1927	
North Carolina 11	V. Lamar Gudger (D)	No	State Senator	1919	
Ohio 2	Tom Luken (D)	Yes	U.S. Representative (Note: Previously elected to the 93rd Congress, serving from 1974 to 1975 in the 1st district.)	1925	
Ohio 13	Don Pease (D)	Yes	State Senator	1931	
Ohio 18	Douglas Applegate (D)	No	State Senator	1928	
Ohio 20	Mary Rose Oakar (D)	No	City Councillor	1940	
Oklahoma 3	Wes Watkins (D)	No	State Senator	1938	
Oklahoma 5	Mickey Edwards (R)	No	Professor	1937	
Pennsylvania 3	Raymond Lederer (D)	No	State Representative	1938	
Pennsylvania 8	Peter H. Kostmayer (D)	Yes	Press secretary	1946	
Pennsylvania 16	Bob Walker (R)	No	Congressional staffer	1942	
Pennsylvania 17	Allen E. Ertel (D)	Yes	District Attorney	1937	
Pennsylvania 18	Doug Walgren (D)	Yes	Corporate attorney	1940	
Pennsylvania 22	Austin Murphy (D)	No	State Senator	1927	
Pennsylvania 23	Joseph S. Ammerman (D)	Yes	State Senator	1924	
Pennsylvania 24	Marc L. Marks (R)	Yes	County Solicitor	1927	
Tennessee 4	Al Gore (D)	No	Investigative reporter	1948	
Texas 5	Jim Mattox (D)	Yes	State Representative	1943	
Texas 22	Robert Gammage (D)	Yes	State Senator	1938	
Utah 2	David Daniel Marriott (R)	Yes	Business executive	1939	
Virginia 1	Paul Trible (R)	Yes	Commonwealth's Attorney	1946	
Washington 6	Norm Dicks (D)	No	Legislative staffer	1940	
West Virginia 4	Nick Rahall (D)	No	Business owner	1949	

==== Non-voting members ====
District	Delegate	Switched party	Prior background	Birth year	Ref
Puerto Rico at-large	Baltasar Corrada del Río (NP/D)	Yes/No (Note: The previous delegate, Jaime Benítez Rexach, was registered as Popular Democratic/Democratic.)	Lawyer	1935	

=== Took office during the 95th Congress ===
District	Representative	Took office	Switched party	Prior background	Birth year	Ref
Minnesota 7	Arlan Stangeland (R)	February 22, 1977	Yes	State Representative	1930	
Georgia 5	Wyche Fowler (D)	April 6, 1977	No	City Councillor	1940	
Washington 7	John E. Cunningham (R)	May 17, 1977	Yes	State Senator	1931	
Louisiana 1	Bob Livingston (R)	August 27, 1977	Yes	Assistant U.S. Attorney	1943	
New York 18	Bill Green (R)	February 14, 1978	Yes	U.S. DHUD official	1929	
New York 21	Robert Garcia (D)	February 21, 1978	No	State Senator	1933	

== See also ==
- List of United States representatives in the 95th Congress
- List of United States senators in the 95th Congress

== Notes ==
Preceded by New members of the 94th Congress	New members of the 95th Congress; 1977–1979	Succeeded by New members of the 96th Congress
