= List of new members of the 96th United States Congress =

The 96th United States Congress began on January 3, 1979. There were 12 new senators (seven Democrats, five Republicans) and 77 new representatives (42 Democrats, 34 Republicans, one Conservative), as well as one new delegate (a Republican), at the start of the first session. Additionally, four senators (one Democrat, three Republicans) and seven representatives (four Democrats, three Republicans) took office on various dates in order to fill vacancies during the 96th Congress before it ended on January 3, 1981.

== Senate ==
=== Took office January 3, 1979 ===
State	Image	Senator	Seniority	Switched party	Prior background	Birth year	Ref
Alabama (Class 2)		Howell Heflin (D)	10th (98th overall)	No; Open seat; replaced John Sparkman (D)	Chief Justice of the Supreme Court of Alabama; U.S. Marine Corps Major	1921	
Arkansas		David Pryor (D)	1st (89th overall)	No; Open seat; replaced Kaneaster Hodges Jr. (D)	Governor of Arkansas; U.S. House of Representatives (Note: Elected to the 89th Congress, serving from 1966 to 1973 in Arkansas's 4th district.); Arkansas House of Representatives	1934	
Colorado		William L. Armstrong (R)	4th (92nd overall)	Yes; Defeated Floyd Haskell (D)	U.S. House of Representatives (Note: Elected to the 93rd Congress, serving from 1973 to 1979 in Colorado's 5th district.); President of the Colorado Senate; Colorado House of Representatives; Colorado Army National Guard	1937	
Iowa		Roger Jepsen (R)	11th (99th overall)	Yes; Defeated Dick Clark (D)	Lieutenant Governor of Iowa; Iowa Senate; Scott County Commission; U.S. Army Reserve Captain	1928	
Maine (Class 2)		William Cohen (R)	2nd (90th overall)	Yes; Defeated William Hathaway (D)	U.S. House of Representatives (Note: Elected to the 93rd Congress, serving from 1973 to 1979 in Maine's 2nd district.); Mayor of Bangor	1940	
Massachusetts		Paul Tsongas (D)	3rd (91st overall)	Yes; Defeated Edward Brooke (R)	U.S. House of Representatives (Note: Elected to the 94th Congress, serving from 1975 to 1979 in Massachusetts's 5th district.); Middlesex County Commission; Lowell City Council	1941	
Michigan		Carl Levin (D)	8th (96th overall)	Yes; Defeated Robert P. Griffin (R)	President of the Detroit City Council	1934	
Nebraska		J. James Exon (D)	7th (95th overall)	Yes; Open seat; replaced Carl Curtis (R)	Governor of Nebraska; U.S. Army Signal Corps	1921	
New Hampshire (Class 2)		Gordon J. Humphrey (R)	12th (100th overall)	Yes; Defeated Thomas J. McIntyre (D)	Professional pilot U.S. Air Force	1940	
New Jersey		Bill Bradley (D)	9th (97th overall)	Yes; Replaced Clifford P. Case (R), who was defeated in a primary	Professional basketball player Air Force Reserve Command	1943	
Oklahoma		David Boren (D)	6th (94th overall)	Yes; Open seat; replaced Dewey F. Bartlett (R)	Governor of Oklahoma; Oklahoma House of Representatives; Oklahoma Army National Guard	1941	
South Dakota		Larry Pressler (R)	5th (93rd overall)	Yes; Open seat; replaced James Abourezk (D)	U.S. House of Representatives (Note: Elected to the 94th Congress, serving from 1975 to 1979 in South Dakota's 1st district.); U.S. Army First Lieutenant	1942	

=== Took office during the 96th Congress ===
State	Image	Senator	Took office	Switched party	Prior background	Birth year	Ref
Maine (Class 1)		George J. Mitchell (D)	May 17, 1980	No; Appointed; replaced Edmund Muskie (D)	U.S. District Court Judge for Maine; U.S. Attorney for Maine	1933	
New Hampshire (Class 3)		Warren Rudman (R)	December 29, 1980	Yes; Defeated John A. Durkin (D)	Attorney General of New Hampshire	1930	
Florida		Paula Hawkins (R)	January 1, 1981	Yes; Replaced Richard Stone (D), who was defeated in a primary	Florida Public Service Commission; Vice President of Air Florida	1927	
Alabama (Class 3)		Jeremiah Denton (R)	January 2, 1981	Yes; Replaced Donald Stewart (D), who was defeated in a primary	U.S. Navy Rear Admiral	1924	

== House of Representatives ==
=== Took office January 3, 1979 ===
District	Representative	Switched party	Prior background	Birth year	Ref
Alabama 7	Richard Shelby (D)	No	State Senator	1934	
Arkansas 2	Ed Bethune (R)	Yes	Prosecutor	1935	
Arkansas 4	Beryl Anthony Jr. (D)	No	Prosecutor	1938	
California 3	Bob Matsui (D)	No	City Councillor	1941	
California 4	Vic Fazio (D)	No	State Assemblyman	1942	
California 14	Norman D. Shumway (R)	Yes	County Supervisor	1934	
California 15	Tony Coelho (D)	No	Congressional staffer	1942	
California 17	Chip Pashayan (R)	Yes	U.S. DHHS official	1941	
California 18	Bill Thomas (R)	No	State Assemblyman	1941	
California 28	Julian Dixon (D)	No	State Assemblyman	1934	
California 33	Wayne R. Grisham (R)	No	Mayor of La Mirada	1923	
California 34	Dan Lungren (R)	Yes	Lawyer	1946	
California 37	Jerry Lewis (R)	No	State Assemblyman	1934	
California 39	William E. Dannemeyer (R)	No	State Assemblyman	1929	
Colorado 3	Ray Kogovsek (D)	No	State Senator	1941	
Colorado 5	Ken Kramer (R)	No	State Representative	1942	
Connecticut 5	William R. Ratchford (D)	Yes	State House Speaker	1934	
Florida 1	Earl Hutto (D)	No	State Representative	1926	
Florida 9	Bill Nelson (D)	Yes	State Representative	1942	
Florida 11	Dan Mica (D)	No	Chief of staff	1944	
Florida 12	Edward J. Stack (D)	Yes	County Sheriff	1910	
Georgia 6	Newt Gingrich (R)	Yes	Professor	1943	
Illinois 1	Bennett Stewart (D)	No	City Councillor	1912	
Illinois 22	Dan Crane (R)	Yes	Dentist	1936	
Indiana 8	H. Joel Deckard (R)	Yes	State Representative	1942	
Iowa 2	Tom Tauke (R)	Yes	State Representative	1950	
Kansas 2	James Edmund Jeffries (R)	Yes	Corporate director	1925	
Kansas 5	Bob Whittaker (R)	No	State Representative	1939	
Kentucky 6	Larry J. Hopkins (R)	Yes	State Senator	1933	
Louisiana 4	Buddy Leach (D)	No	State Representative	1934	
Maine 2	Olympia Snowe (R)	No	State Senator	1947	
Maryland 6	Beverly Byron (D)	No	Political organizer	1932	
Maryland 8	Michael D. Barnes (D)	Yes	Public Service Commissioner	1943	
Massachusetts 5	James Shannon (D)	No	Congressional aide	1952	
Massachusetts 6	Nicholas Mavroules (D)	No	Mayor of Peabody	1929	
Massachusetts 11	Brian J. Donnelly (D)	No	State Representative	1946	
Michigan 3	Howard Wolpe (D)	Yes	State Representative	1939	
Michigan 10	Donald J. Albosta (D)	Yes	State Representative	1925	
Michigan 11	Robert William Davis (R)	No	State Senator	1932	
Minnesota 1	Arlen Erdahl (R)	No	Minnesota Secretary of State	1931	
Minnesota 5	Martin Olav Sabo (DFL)	No	State House Speaker	1938	
Mississippi 4	Jon Hinson (R)	No	Congressional aide	1942	
Montana 1	Pat Williams (D)	No	State Representative	1937	
Nebraska 1	Doug Bereuter (R)	No	State Senator	1939	
New Jersey 13	Jim Courter (R)	Yes	Lawyer	1941	
New Jersey 14	Frank Joseph Guarini (D)	No	State Senator	1924	
New York 1	William Carney (C)	Yes (Note: Carney joined the Republican Party in October 1985, during the 99th Congress.)	County Legislator	1942	
New York 9	Geraldine Ferraro (D)	No	Lawyer	1935	
New York 23	Peter A. Peyser (D)	Yes	U.S. Representative (Note: Previously elected to the 92nd Congress, serving from 1971 to 1977.)	1921	
New York 29	Gerald Solomon (R)	Yes	State Assemblyman	1930	
New York 33	Gary A. Lee (R)	No	State Assemblyman	1933	
Ohio 3	Tony P. Hall (D)	Yes	State Senator	1942	
Ohio 19	Lyle Williams (R)	Yes	County Commissioner	1942	
Oklahoma 2	Mike Synar (D)	No	Real estate broker	1950	
Pennsylvania 2	William H. Gray III (D)	No	Minister	1941	
Pennsylvania 4	Charles F. Dougherty (R)	Yes	State Senator	1937	
Pennsylvania 15	Donald L. Ritter (R)	Yes	Metallurgical engineer	1940	
Pennsylvania 21	Donald A. Bailey (D)	No	Lawyer	1945	
Pennsylvania 23	William Clinger (R)	Yes	Lawyer	1929	
Pennsylvania 25	Eugene Atkinson (D)	Yes (Note: Atkinson joined the Republican Party in October 1981, during the 97th Congress.)	County Commissioner	1927	
South Carolina 4	Carroll A. Campbell Jr. (R)	Yes	State Senator	1940	
South Dakota 1	Tom Daschle (D)	No	Congressional aide	1947	
Tennessee 5	Bill Boner (D)	No	State Senator	1945	
Texas 6	Phil Gramm (D)	No	Professor	1942	
Texas 11	Marvin Leath (D)	No	Businessman	1931	
Texas 14	Joseph P. Wyatt Jr. (D)	No	State Representative	1941	
Texas 17	Charles Stenholm (D)	No	Business executive	1938	
Texas 18	Mickey Leland (D)	No	State Representative	1944	
Texas 19	Kent Hance (D)	No	State Senator	1942	
Texas 21	Tom Loeffler (R)	Yes	Assistant to President Gerald Ford	1946	
Texas 22	Ron Paul (R)	Yes	U.S. Representative (Note: Previously elected to the 94th Congress, serving from 1976 to 1977.)	1935	
Texas 24	Martin Frost (D)	No	Lawyer	1942	
Washington 2	Al Swift (D)	No	Broadcaster	1935	
Washington 7	Mike Lowry (D)	Yes	County Councilor	1939	
Wisconsin 8	Toby Roth (R)	Yes	State Assemblyman	1938	
Wisconsin 9	Jim Sensenbrenner (R)	No	State Senator	1943	
Wyoming at-large	Dick Cheney (R)	Yes	White House Chief of Staff	1941	

==== Non-voting members ====
District	Delegate	Switched party	Prior background	Birth year	Ref
U.S. Virgin Islands at-large	Melvin H. Evans (R)	Yes	Governor of the U.S. Virgin Islands	1917	

=== Took office during the 96th Congress ===
District	Representative	Took office	Switched party	Prior background	Birth year	Ref
California 11	William Royer (R)	April 3, 1979	Yes	County Supervisor	1920	
Wisconsin 6	Tom Petri (R)	April 3, 1979	No	State Senator	1940	
Illinois 10	John Porter (R)	January 22, 1980	Yes	State Representative	1935	
Pennsylvania 11	Ray Musto (D)	September 9, 1980	No	State Representative	1929	
Louisiana 3	Billy Tauzin (D)	May 22, 1980	Yes (Note: Tauzin joined the Republican Party in August 1995, during the 104th Congress.)	State Representative	1943	
West Virginia 3	John G. Hutchinson (D)	June 30, 1980	No	Mayor of Charleston	1935	
Michigan 13	George Crockett Jr. (D)	November 4, 1980	No	Jurist	1909	

== See also ==
- List of United States representatives in the 96th Congress
- List of United States senators in the 96th Congress

== Notes ==
Preceded by New members of the 95th Congress	New members of the 96th Congress; 1979–1981	Succeeded by New members of the 97th Congress
