= Roy Rowland =

Roy Rowland may refer to:

- J. Roy Rowland (1926–2022), American physician and politician from Georgia
- Roy Rowland (film director) (1910–1995), American film director
