= 1976 United States presidential election in Tennessee =

- November 2, 1976

Nominee	Jimmy Carter	Gerald Ford
Party	Democratic	Republican
Home state	Georgia	Michigan
Running mate	Walter Mondale	Bob Dole
Electoral vote	10	0
Popular vote	825,879	633,969
Percentage	55.94%	42.94%

Carter
40–50%
50–60%
60–70%
70–80%
80–90%
Ford
50–60%
60–70%
President before election
Gerald Ford
Republican
Elected President
Jimmy Carter
Democratic

The 1976 United States presidential election in Tennessee was held on November 2, 1976. The Democratic Party candidate, former Georgia governor Jimmy Carter won the state of Tennessee with 56% of the vote against Republican Party candidate, President Gerald Ford, carrying the state's 10 electoral votes.

As of the 2024 presidential election, this was the last time a Democratic presidential candidate won more than 50% of the vote in Tennessee or carried the state by a double-digit margin. This was also the last presidential election until 2020 that the Democratic nominee won over 60% of the vote in Davidson County, home to Nashville.

This is also the last election in which Williamson County, Sullivan County, Madison County, Hamblen County, Cumberland County, McMinn County, Loudon County, Monroe County, Rhea County, and Chester County voted for a Democratic presidential candidate. In addition, despite landslide victories statewide in previous elections, this would be the first time Wayne County would vote for the Republican nominee by less than 16 points since Samuel J. Tilden's victory in the county, as well as the closest any Democratic candidate running for president would get to winning there since Reconstruction.

== Background ==
From 1966 to 1972, the Republicans won Tennessee in the presidential elections, both of the state's seats in the United States Senate, the governorship, and increased its membership in the U.S. House to four of the state's nine seats. However, Democratic gubernatorial nominee Ray Blanton won in the 1974 election.

== Campaign ==
Carter won Tennessee and the Democratic nominee won in the concurrent senatorial election. Among white voters, 51% supported Carter while 48% supported Ford.

== Primary elections ==
=== Democratic primary ===
Jimmy Carter easily won Tennessee in the 1976 Democratic Party presidential primaries.

=== Republican primary ===
Gerald Ford narrowly won the popular vote in the 1976 Tennessee Republican presidential primary, but Ronald Reagan won the majority of Tennessee's delegates.

== Results ==
Electoral results
Presidential candidate	Party	Home state	Popular vote		Electoral vote	Running mate		
Presidential candidate	Party	Home state	Count	Percentage	Electoral vote	Vice-presidential candidate	Home state	Electoral vote
Jimmy Carter	Democratic	Georgia	825,879	55.94%	10	Walter Mondale	Minnesota	10
Gerald Ford (incumbent)	Republican	Michigan	633,969	42.94%	0	Bob Dole	Kansas	0
Thomas J. Anderson	Independent	Tennessee	5,769	0.39%	0	Rufus Shackelford	Florida	0
Eugene McCarthy	Independent	Minnesota	5,004	0.34%	0	—	—	0
Lester Maddox	Independent	Georgia	2,303	0.16%	0	William Dyke	Wisconsin	0
Roger MacBride	Independent	Virginia	1,375	0.09%	0	David Bergland	California	0
Gus Hall	Independent	New York	547	0.04%	0	Jarvis Tyner	New York	0
Lyndon LaRouche	Independent	New York	512	0.03%	0	R. Wayne Evans	Michigan	0
Benjamin Bubar	Independent	Maine	442	0.03%	0	Earl Dodge	Colorado	0
Ernest Miller	Independent	—	316	0.02%	0	Roy Eddy	—	0
Write-ins	—	—	230	0.02%	0	—	—	0

=== Results by county ===
County	Jimmy Carter Democratic		Gerald Ford Republican		Thomas Anderson Independent		Eugene McCarthy Independent		Various candidates Other parties		Margin		Total votes cast
County	#	%	#	%	#	%	#	%	#	%	#	%	Total votes cast
Anderson	13,455	55.50%	10,494	43.29%	60	0.25%	150	0.62%	83	0.34%	2,961	12.21%	24,242
Bedford	7,228	69.79%	3,023	29.19%	41	0.40%	26	0.25%	39	0.38%	4,205	40.60%	10,357
Benton	4,088	70.41%	1,678	28.90%	21	0.36%	9	0.16%	10	0.17%	2,410	41.51%	5,806
Bledsoe	1,757	51.66%	1,620	47.63%	9	0.26%	7	0.21%	8	0.24%	137	4.03%	3,401
Blount	12,096	46.10%	13,851	52.79%	71	0.27%	92	0.35%	130	0.50%	-1,755	-6.69%	26,240
Bradley	8,776	48.62%	9,136	50.61%	28	0.16%	42	0.23%	69	0.38%	-360	-1.99%	18,051
Campbell	5,206	54.47%	4,277	44.75%	29	0.30%	15	0.16%	30	0.31%	929	9.72%	9,557
Cannon	2,463	72.46%	908	26.71%	15	0.44%	5	0.15%	8	0.24%	1,555	45.75%	3,399
Carroll	5,581	57.41%	4,031	41.47%	48	0.49%	19	0.20%	42	0.43%	1,550	15.94%	9,721
Carter	7,443	45.08%	8,934	54.11%	27	0.16%	58	0.35%	48	0.29%	-1,491	-9.03%	16,510
Cheatham	4,225	74.59%	1,376	24.29%	30	0.53%	10	0.18%	23	0.41%	2,849	50.30%	5,664
Chester	2,532	56.05%	1,949	43.15%	14	0.31%	2	0.04%	20	0.44%	583	12.90%	4,517
Claiborne	3,461	51.33%	3,227	47.86%	19	0.28%	15	0.22%	21	0.31%	234	3.47%	6,743
Clay	1,671	62.40%	982	36.67%	14	0.52%	5	0.19%	6	0.22%	689	25.73%	2,678
Cocke	3,141	38.22%	5,004	60.88%	22	0.27%	22	0.27%	30	0.37%	-1,863	-22.66%	8,219
Coffee	8,017	66.78%	3,848	32.05%	48	0.40%	55	0.46%	37	0.31%	4,169	34.73%	12,005
Crockett	2,963	63.08%	1,694	36.07%	15	0.32%	8	0.17%	17	0.36%	1,269	27.01%	4,697
Cumberland	4,543	51.84%	4,119	47.00%	42	0.48%	22	0.25%	37	0.42%	424	4.84%	8,763
Davidson	99,007	61.27%	60,662	37.54%	529	0.33%	785	0.49%	615	0.38%	38,345	23.73%	161,598
DeKalb	2,432	59.09%	1,637	39.77%	15	0.36%	12	0.29%	20	0.49%	795	19.32%	4,116
Decatur	3,222	68.52%	1,443	30.69%	9	0.19%	14	0.30%	14	0.30%	1,779	37.83%	4,702
Dickson	6,551	73.43%	2,285	25.61%	32	0.36%	15	0.17%	39	0.44%	4,266	47.82%	8,922
Dyer	5,937	56.66%	4,391	41.91%	56	0.53%	15	0.14%	79	0.75%	1,546	14.75%	10,478
Fayette	3,853	63.79%	2,133	35.31%	19	0.31%	11	0.18%	24	0.40%	1,720	28.48%	6,040
Fentress	1,953	51.97%	1,767	47.02%	11	0.29%	12	0.32%	15	0.40%	186	4.95%	3,758
Franklin	6,788	71.27%	2,619	27.50%	27	0.28%	37	0.39%	53	0.56%	4,169	43.77%	9,524
Gibson	10,356	64.60%	5,563	34.70%	42	0.26%	30	0.19%	40	0.25%	4,793	29.90%	16,031
Giles	5,225	72.09%	1,952	26.93%	22	0.30%	25	0.34%	24	0.33%	3,273	45.16%	7,248
Grainger	2,018	41.50%	2,805	57.68%	12	0.25%	10	0.21%	18	0.37%	-787	-16.18%	4,863
Greene	7,070	44.52%	8,664	54.56%	53	0.33%	50	0.31%	43	0.27%	-1,594	-10.04%	15,880
Grundy	2,850	76.59%	850	22.84%	12	0.32%	2	0.05%	7	0.19%	2,000	53.75%	3,721
Hamblen	7,504	51.30%	6,989	47.78%	49	0.33%	35	0.24%	51	0.35%	515	3.52%	14,628
Hamilton	45,348	48.03%	47,969	50.80%	306	0.32%	304	0.32%	494	0.52%	-2,621	-2.77%	94,421
Hancock	764	36.56%	1,309	62.63%	7	0.33%	1	0.05%	9	0.43%	-545	-26.07%	2,090
Hardeman	3,934	62.74%	2,254	35.95%	25	0.40%	13	0.21%	44	0.70%	1,680	26.79%	6,270
Hardin	3,438	50.18%	3,362	49.07%	9	0.13%	13	0.19%	30	0.44%	76	1.11%	6,852
Hawkins	5,931	47.78%	6,407	51.62%	24	0.19%	15	0.12%	35	0.28%	-476	-3.84%	12,412
Haywood	3,681	65.02%	1,952	34.48%	13	0.23%	5	0.09%	10	0.18%	1,729	30.54%	5,661
Henderson	3,366	44.37%	4,152	54.73%	20	0.26%	13	0.17%	35	0.46%	-786	-10.36%	7,586
Henry	7,162	72.48%	2,585	26.16%	87	0.88%	17	0.17%	30	0.30%	4,577	46.32%	9,881
Hickman	3,590	74.99%	1,154	24.11%	28	0.58%	8	0.17%	7	0.15%	2,436	50.88%	4,787
Houston	1,990	81.99%	407	16.77%	10	0.41%	8	0.33%	12	0.49%	1,583	65.22%	2,427
Humphreys	4,021	74.28%	1,338	24.72%	25	0.46%	16	0.30%	13	0.24%	2,683	49.56%	5,413
Jackson	2,959	82.91%	591	16.56%	4	0.11%	9	0.25%	6	0.17%	2,368	66.35%	3,569
Jefferson	3,995	41.89%	5,459	57.23%	26	0.27%	26	0.27%	32	0.34%	-1,464	-15.34%	9,538
Johnson	1,464	32.69%	2,986	66.68%	11	0.25%	6	0.13%	11	0.25%	-1,522	-33.99%	4,478
Knox	53,034	48.03%	56,013	50.73%	367	0.33%	600	0.54%	395	0.36%	-2,979	-2.70%	110,409
Lake	1,933	75.83%	591	23.19%	6	0.24%	4	0.16%	15	0.59%	1,342	52.64%	2,549
Lauderdale	4,747	69.03%	2,105	30.61%	15	0.22%	4	0.06%	6	0.09%	2,642	38.42%	6,877
Lawrence	7,140	58.57%	4,967	40.75%	33	0.27%	24	0.20%	26	0.21%	2,173	17.82%	12,190
Lewis	2,391	78.75%	617	20.32%	11	0.36%	8	0.26%	9	0.30%	1,774	58.43%	3,036
Lincoln	5,732	76.24%	1,724	22.93%	31	0.41%	14	0.19%	17	0.23%	4,008	53.31%	7,518
Loudon	4,683	50.72%	4,458	48.28%	36	0.39%	16	0.17%	40	0.43%	225	2.44%	9,233
Macon	1,951	48.16%	2,063	50.93%	21	0.52%	9	0.22%	7	0.17%	-112	-2.77%	4,051
Madison	12,989	52.67%	11,364	46.08%	119	0.48%	64	0.26%	123	0.50%	1,625	6.59%	24,659
Marion	4,615	60.39%	2,965	38.80%	16	0.21%	8	0.10%	38	0.50%	1,650	21.59%	7,642
Marshall	4,457	71.78%	1,674	26.96%	53	0.85%	9	0.14%	16	0.26%	2,783	44.82%	6,209
Maury	8,747	61.32%	5,327	37.34%	91	0.64%	41	0.29%	59	0.41%	3,420	23.98%	14,265
McMinn	7,020	51.12%	6,638	48.34%	17	0.12%	21	0.15%	36	0.26%	382	2.78%	13,732
McNairy	4,293	55.49%	3,388	43.80%	17	0.22%	6	0.08%	32	0.41%	905	11.69%	7,736
Meigs	1,254	55.93%	975	43.49%	1	0.04%	6	0.27%	6	0.27%	279	12.44%	2,242
Monroe	5,368	49.91%	5,335	49.60%	14	0.13%	10	0.09%	29	0.27%	33	0.31%	10,756
Montgomery	12,310	66.73%	5,923	32.11%	66	0.36%	70	0.38%	79	0.43%	6,387	34.62%	18,448
Moore	1,101	76.04%	331	22.86%	7	0.48%	2	0.14%	7	0.48%	770	53.18%	1,448
Morgan	2,953	59.79%	1,949	39.46%	15	0.30%	11	0.22%	11	0.22%	1,004	20.33%	4,939
Obion	7,204	69.81%	2,986	28.93%	67	0.65%	19	0.18%	44	0.43%	4,218	40.88%	10,320
Overton	3,897	77.21%	1,115	22.09%	12	0.24%	2	0.04%	21	0.42%	2,782	55.12%	5,047
Perry	1,660	75.42%	520	23.63%	6	0.27%	6	0.27%	9	0.41%	1,140	51.79%	2,201
Pickett	948	48.77%	986	50.72%	2	0.10%	3	0.15%	5	0.26%	-38	-1.95%	1,944
Polk	3,284	63.71%	1,835	35.60%	14	0.27%	9	0.17%	13	0.25%	1,449	28.11%	5,155
Putnam	8,485	66.77%	4,079	32.10%	34	0.27%	60	0.47%	50	0.39%	4,406	34.67%	12,708
Rhea	3,735	51.58%	3,449	47.63%	19	0.26%	11	0.15%	27	0.37%	286	3.95%	7,241
Roane	9,216	55.89%	7,121	43.18%	48	0.29%	51	0.31%	55	0.33%	2,095	12.71%	16,491
Robertson	7,547	74.62%	2,505	24.77%	36	0.36%	15	0.15%	11	0.11%	5,042	49.85%	10,114
Rutherford	14,854	64.35%	7,921	34.32%	95	0.41%	107	0.46%	105	0.45%	6,933	30.03%	23,082
Scott	2,260	47.78%	2,432	51.42%	13	0.27%	14	0.30%	11	0.23%	-172	-3.64%	4,730
Sequatchie	1,733	60.98%	1,065	37.47%	22	0.77%	7	0.25%	15	0.53%	668	23.51%	2,842
Sevier	3,993	33.80%	7,608	64.40%	102	0.86%	49	0.41%	62	0.52%	-3,615	-30.60%	11,814
Shelby	147,893	52.89%	128,646	46.01%	652	0.23%	1,086	0.39%	1,324	0.47%	19,247	6.88%	279,601
Smith	3,753	73.07%	1,332	25.93%	28	0.55%	7	0.14%	16	0.31%	2,421	47.14%	5,136
Stewart	2,442	82.17%	510	17.16%	4	0.13%	5	0.17%	11	0.37%	1,932	65.01%	2,972
Sullivan	23,353	49.94%	22,087	47.23%	1,003	2.14%	164	0.35%	155	0.33%	1,266	2.71%	46,762
Sumner	13,848	62.91%	7,946	36.10%	102	0.46%	61	0.28%	55	0.25%	5,902	26.81%	22,012
Tipton	5,667	62.47%	3,329	36.70%	31	0.34%	19	0.21%	26	0.29%	2,338	25.77%	9,072
Trousdale	1,385	80.24%	332	19.24%	3	0.17%	2	0.12%	4	0.23%	1,053	61.00%	1,726
Unicoi	2,526	43.69%	3,211	55.53%	15	0.26%	16	0.28%	14	0.24%	-685	-11.84%	5,782
Union	1,631	47.18%	1,801	52.10%	6	0.17%	10	0.29%	9	0.26%	-170	-4.92%	3,457
Van Buren	1,085	75.24%	346	23.99%	3	0.21%	2	0.14%	6	0.42%	739	51.25%	1,442
Warren	6,666	73.13%	2,364	25.94%	27	0.30%	22	0.24%	36	0.39%	4,302	47.19%	9,115
Washington	13,951	48.05%	14,770	50.87%	84	0.29%	114	0.39%	113	0.39%	-819	-2.82%	29,032
Wayne	1,891	41.92%	2,597	57.57%	10	0.22%	8	0.18%	5	0.11%	-706	-15.65%	4,511
Weakley	6,605	68.12%	2,875	29.65%	173	1.78%	23	0.24%	20	0.21%	3,730	38.47%	9,696
White	3,874	72.90%	1,382	26.01%	31	0.58%	19	0.36%	8	0.15%	2,492	46.89%	5,314
Williamson	8,183	50.31%	7,880	48.44%	114	0.70%	54	0.33%	35	0.22%	303	1.87%	16,266
Wilson	10,537	68.59%	4,696	30.57%	52	0.34%	48	0.31%	29	0.19%	5,841	38.02%	15,362
Totals	825,879	55.94%	633,969	42.94%	5,769	0.39%	5,004	0.34%	5,725	0.39%	191,910	13.00%	1,476,346

==== Counties that flipped from Republican to Democratic ====
- Anderson
- Bedford
- Benton
- Bledsoe
- Campbell
- Cannon
- Carroll
- Cheatham
- Chester
- Claiborne
- Clay
- Coffee
- Crockett
- Cumberland
- Davidson
- Decatur
- DeKalb
- Dickson
- Dyer
- Fayette
- Fentress
- Franklin
- Gibson
- Giles
- Grundy
- Hamblen
- Hardeman
- Hardin
- Haywood
- Henry
- Hickman
- Humphreys
- Lake
- Lauderdale
- Lawrence
- Lewis
- Lincoln
- Loudon
- Madison
- Marion
- Marshall
- Maury
- McMinn
- McNairy
- Meigs
- Monroe
- Montgomery
- Moore
- Morgan
- Morgan
- Obion
- Overton
- Polk
- Putnam
- Rhea
- Roane
- Robertson
- Rutherford
- Sequatchie
- Shelby
- Smith
- Sullivan
- Sumner
- Tipton
- Trousdale
- Van Buren
- Warren
- Weakley
- White
- Williamson
- Wilson

=== Results by congressional district ===
In Tennessee Jimmy Carter won 6 out of the 8 congressional districts, including one that elected a republican, while Ford won the other two.

District	Carter	Ford	Representative
1st	46.4%	53.6%	Jimmy Quillen
2nd	49.2%	50.8%	John Duncan Sr.
3rd	52.0%	48.0%	Marilyn Lloyd
4th	68.0%	32.0%	Al Gore
5th	63.2%	36.8%	Clifford Allen
6th	52.6%	47.4%	Robin Beard
7th	57.7%	42.3%	Ed Jones
8th	64.9%	35.1%	Harold Ford Sr.

== Works cited ==
- Black, Earl; Black, Merle (1992). The Vital South: How Presidents Are Elected. Harvard University Press. ISBN 0674941306.
- Moreland, Laurence; Steed, Robert; Baker, Tod, eds. (1991). The 1988 Presidential Election in the South: Continuity Amidst Change in Southern Party Politics. Praeger Publishers. ISBN 0275931455.
