= List of United States representatives in the 96th Congress =

This is a complete list of United States representatives during the 96th United States Congress listed by seniority.

As an historical article, the districts and party affiliations listed reflect those during the 96th Congress (January 3, 1979 – January 3, 1981). Seats and party affiliations on similar lists for other congresses will be different for certain members.

Seniority depends on the date on which members were sworn into office. Since many members are sworn in on the same day, subsequent ranking is based on previous congressional service of the individual and then by alphabetical order by the last name of the representative.

Committee chairmanship in the House is often associated with seniority. However, party leadership is typically not associated with seniority.

Note: The "*" indicates that the representative/delegate may have served one or more non-consecutive terms while in the House of Representatives of the United States Congress.

== U.S. House seniority list ==
U.S. House seniority
Rank	Representative	Party	District	Seniority date (Previous service, if any)	No.# of term(s)	Notes
1	Jamie Whitten	D	MS-01	November 4, 1941	20th term	Dean of the House
2	Charles Melvin Price	D	IL-23	January 3, 1945	18th term	
3	Charles Edward Bennett	D	FL-03	January 3, 1949	16th term	
4	Richard Walker Bolling	D	MO-05	January 3, 1949	16th term	
5	Carl D. Perkins	D	KY-07	January 3, 1949	16th term	
6	Peter W. Rodino	D	NJ-10	January 3, 1949	16th term	
7	Harley Orrin Staggers	D	WV-02	January 3, 1949	16th term	Left the House in 1981.
8	Tom Steed	D	OK-04	January 3, 1949	16th term	Left the House in 1981.
9	Clement J. Zablocki	D	WI-04	January 3, 1949	16th term	
10	Edward Boland	D	MA-02	January 3, 1953	14th term	
11	Jack Brooks	D	TX-09	January 3, 1953	14th term	
12	Lawrence H. Fountain	D	NC-02	January 3, 1953	14th term	
13	Tip O'Neill	D	MA-08	January 3, 1953	14th term	Speaker of the House
14	John J. Rhodes	R	AZ-01	January 3, 1953	14th term	
15	Bob Wilson	R	CA-41	January 3, 1953	14th term	Left the House in 1981.
16	William Natcher	D	KY-02	August 1, 1953	14th term	
17	Thomas W. L. Ashley	D	OH-09	January 3, 1955	13th term	Left the House in 1981.
18	Charles Diggs	D	MI-13	January 3, 1955	13th term	Resigned on June 3, 1980.
19	Dante Fascell	D	FL-15	January 3, 1955	13th term	
20	Daniel J. Flood	D	PA-11	January 3, 1955; Previous service, 1945–1947 and 1949–1953.	16th term**	Resigned on January 31, 1980.
21	Henry S. Reuss	D	WI-05	January 3, 1955	13th term	
22	Frank Thompson	D	NJ-04	January 3, 1955	13th term	Resigned on December 29, 1980.
23	Charles Vanik	D	OH-22	January 3, 1955	13th term	Left the House in 1981.
24	Jim Wright	D	TX-12	January 3, 1955	13th term	
25	John Dingell	D	MI-16	December 13, 1955	13th term	
26	William Broomfield	R	MI-19	January 3, 1957	12th term	
27	Robert Michel	R	IL-18	January 3, 1957	12th term	
28	Al Ullman	D	OR-02	January 3, 1957	12th term	Left the House in 1981.
29	John Brademas	D	IN-03	January 3, 1959	11th term	Left the House in 1981.
30	Silvio O. Conte	R	MA-01	January 3, 1959	11th term	
31	Ed Derwinski	R	IL-04	January 3, 1959	11th term	
32	Samuel L. Devine	R	OH-12	January 3, 1959	11th term	Left the House in 1981.
33	Robert Giaimo	D	CT-03	January 3, 1959	11th term	Left the House in 1981.
34	Harold T. Johnson	D	CA-01	January 3, 1959	11th term	Left the House in 1981.
35	Robert Kastenmeier	D	WI-02	January 3, 1959	11th term	
36	Del Latta	R	OH-05	January 3, 1959	11th term	
37	William S. Moorhead	D	PA-14	January 3, 1959	11th term	
38	Dan Rostenkowski	D	IL-08	January 3, 1959	11th term	
39	John M. Slack Jr.	D	WV-03	January 3, 1959	11th term	Died on March 17, 1980.
40	Neal Smith	D	IA-04	January 3, 1959	11th term	
41	Samuel S. Stratton	D	NY-28	January 3, 1959	11th term	
42	Joseph Patrick Addabbo	D	NY-07	January 3, 1961	10th term	
43	John B. Anderson	R	IL-16	January 3, 1961	10th term	Left the House in 1981.
44	John M. Ashbrook	R	OH-17	January 3, 1961	10th term	
45	James C. Corman	D	CA-21	January 3, 1961	10th term	Left the House in 1981.
46	Paul Findley	R	IL-20	January 3, 1961	10th term	
47	Fernand St. Germain	D	RI-01	January 3, 1961	10th term	
48	Bill Harsha	R	OH-06	January 3, 1961	10th term	Left the House in 1981.
49	Richard Howard Ichord Jr.	D	MO-08	January 3, 1961	10th term	Left the House in 1981.
50	Mo Udall	D	AZ-02	May 2, 1961	10th term	
51	Henry B. González	D	TX-20	November 4, 1961	10th term	
52	Lucien N. Nedzi	D	MI-14	November 7, 1961	10th term	Left the House in 1981.
53	Ray Roberts	D	TX-04	January 30, 1962	10th term	Left the House in 1981.
54	Benjamin S. Rosenthal	D	NY-08	February 20, 1962	10th term	
55	Jim Broyhill	R	NC-10	January 3, 1963	9th term	
56	James Colgate Cleveland	R	NH-02	January 3, 1963	9th term	Left the House in 1981.
57	Lionel Van Deerlin	D	CA-42	January 3, 1963	9th term	Left the House in 1981.
58	Don Edwards	D	CA-10	January 3, 1963	9th term	
59	Don Fuqua	D	FL-02	January 3, 1963	9th term	
60	Sam Gibbons	D	FL-07	January 3, 1963	9th term	
61	Augustus F. Hawkins	D	CA-29	January 3, 1963	9th term	
62	Frank Horton	R	NY-34	January 3, 1963	9th term	
63	Clarence Long	D	MD-02	January 3, 1963	9th term	
64	Robert McClory	R	IL-13	January 3, 1963	9th term	
65	Joseph McDade	R	PA-10	January 3, 1963	9th term	
66	Joseph Minish	D	NJ-11	January 3, 1963	9th term	
67	John M. Murphy	D	NY-17	January 3, 1963	9th term	Left the House in 1981.
68	Edward J. Patten	D	NJ-15	January 3, 1963	9th term	Left the House in 1981.
69	Claude Pepper	D	FL-14	January 3, 1963	9th term	
70	Jimmy Quillen	R	TN-01	January 3, 1963	9th term	
71	Edward R. Roybal	D	CA-25	January 3, 1963	9th term	
72	Charles H. Wilson	D	CA-31	January 3, 1963	9th term	Left the House in 1981.
73	John W. Wydler	R	NY-05	January 3, 1963	9th term	Left the House in 1981.
74	Don H. Clausen	R	CA-02	January 22, 1963	9th term	
75	Mark Andrews	R	ND	October 22, 1963	9th term	Left the House in 1981.
76	J. J. Pickle	D	TX-10	December 21, 1963	9th term	
77	Phillip Burton	D	CA-06	February 18, 1964	9th term	
78	Frank Annunzio	D	IL-11	January 3, 1965	8th term	
79	Jonathan Brewster Bingham	D	NY-22	January 3, 1965	8th term	
80	John Hall Buchanan Jr.	R	AL-06	January 3, 1965	8th term	Left the House in 1981.
81	Tim Lee Carter	R	KY-05	January 3, 1965	8th term	Left the House in 1981.
82	Barber Conable	R	NY-35	January 3, 1965	8th term	
83	John Conyers	D	MI-01	January 3, 1965	8th term	
84	Bill Dickinson	R	AL-02	January 3, 1965	8th term	
85	John Duncan Sr.	R	TN-02	January 3, 1965	8th term	
86	Jack Edwards	R	AL-01	January 3, 1965	8th term	
87	John N. Erlenborn	R	IL-14	January 3, 1965	8th term	
88	Tom Foley	D	WA-05	January 3, 1965	8th term	
89	William Ford	D	MI-15	January 3, 1965	8th term	
90	Kika De la Garza	D	TX-15	January 3, 1965	8th term	
91	Lee Hamilton	D	IN-09	January 3, 1965	8th term	
92	James M. Hanley	D	NY-32	January 3, 1965	8th term	Left the House in 1981.
93	James J. Howard	D	NJ-03	January 3, 1965	8th term	
94	Robert C. McEwen	R	NY-30	January 3, 1965	8th term	Left the House in 1981.
95	David E. Satterfield III	D	VA-03	January 3, 1965	8th term	Left the House in 1981.
96	J. William Stanton	R	OH-11	January 3, 1965	8th term	
97	Richard Crawford White	D	TX-16	January 3, 1965	8th term	
98	Lester L. Wolff	D	NY-06	January 3, 1965	8th term	Left the House in 1981.
99	Sidney Yates	D	IL-09	January 3, 1965; Previous service, 1949–1963.	15th term*	
100	Clarence Brown Jr.	R	OH-07	November 2, 1965	8th term	
101	Walter B. Jones Sr.	D	NC-01	February 5, 1966	8th term	
102	Guy Vander Jagt	R	MI-09	November 8, 1966	8th term	
103	Tom Bevill	D	AL-04	January 3, 1967	7th term	
104	Jack Thomas Brinkley	D	GA-03	January 3, 1967	7th term	
105	Robert C. Eckhardt	D	TX-08	January 3, 1967	7th term	Left the House in 1981.
106	John Paul Hammerschmidt	R	AR-03	January 3, 1967	7th term	
107	Margaret Heckler	R	MA-10	January 3, 1967	7th term	
108	Abraham Kazen	D	TX-23	January 3, 1967	7th term	
109	Clarence E. Miller	R	OH-10	January 3, 1967	7th term	
110	Sonny Montgomery	D	MS-03	January 3, 1967	7th term	
111	John Myers	R	IN-07	January 3, 1967	7th term	
112	Bill Nichols	D	AL-03	January 3, 1967	7th term	
113	Tom Railsback	R	IL-19	January 3, 1967	7th term	
114	Gene Snyder	R	KY-04	January 3, 1967; Previous service, 1963–1965.	8th term*	
115	William C. Wampler	R	VA-09	January 3, 1967; Previous service, 1953–1955.	8th term*	
116	Larry Winn	R	KS-03	January 3, 1967	7th term	
117	Chalmers Wylie	R	OH-15	January 3, 1967	7th term	
118	Pete McCloskey	R	CA-12	December 12, 1967	7th term	
119	James M. Collins	R	TX-03	August 24, 1968	7th term	
120	Joseph M. Gaydos	D	PA-20	November 5, 1968	7th term	
121	Bill Alexander	D	AR-01	January 3, 1969	6th term	
122	Glenn M. Anderson	D	CA-32	January 3, 1969	6th term	
123	Mario Biaggi	D	NY-10	January 3, 1969	6th term	
124	Bill Burlison	D	MO-10	January 3, 1969	6th term	Left the House in 1981.
125	William V. Chappell Jr.	D	FL-04	January 3, 1969	6th term	
126	Shirley Chisholm	D	NY-12	January 3, 1969	6th term	
127	Bill Clay	D	MO-01	January 3, 1969	6th term	
128	Lawrence Coughlin	R	PA-13	January 3, 1969	6th term	
129	Dan Daniel	D	VA-05	January 3, 1969	6th term	
130	Hamilton Fish	R	NY-25	January 3, 1969	6th term	
131	Bob Mollohan	D	WV-01	January 3, 1969; Previous service, 1953–1957.	8th term*	
132	Manuel Lujan Jr.	R	NM-01	January 3, 1969	6th term	
133	L. Richardson Preyer	D	NC-06	January 3, 1969	6th term	Left the House in 1981.
134	Keith Sebelius	R	KS-01	January 3, 1969	6th term	Left the House in 1981.
135	Louis Stokes	D	OH-21	January 3, 1969	6th term	
136	G. William Whitehurst	R	VA-02	January 3, 1969	6th term	
137	Gus Yatron	D	PA-06	January 3, 1969	6th term	
138	Ed Jones	D	TN-07	March 25, 1969	6th term	
139	Dave Obey	D	WI-07	April 1, 1969	6th term	
140	Barry Goldwater Jr.	R	CA-20	April 29, 1969	6th term	
141	Robert A. Roe	D	NJ-08	November 4, 1969	6th term	
142	Phil Crane	R	IL-12	November 25, 1969	6th term	
143	John H. Rousselot	R	CA-26	June 30, 1970; Previous service, 1961–1963.	7th term*	
144	Edwin B. Forsythe	R	NJ-06	November 3, 1970	6th term	
145	Bill Archer	R	TX-07	January 3, 1971	5th term	
146	Les Aspin	D	WI-01	January 3, 1971	5th term	
147	William R. Cotter	D	CT-01	January 3, 1971	5th term	
148	George E. Danielson	D	CA-30	January 3, 1971	5th term	
149	Ron Dellums	D	CA-08	January 3, 1971	5th term	
150	Robert Drinan	D	MA-04	January 3, 1971	5th term	Left the House in 1981.
151	Bill Frenzel	R	MN-03	January 3, 1971	5th term	
152	Jack Kemp	R	NY-38	January 3, 1971	5th term	
153	Elwood Hillis	R	IN-05	January 3, 1971	5th term	
154	Norman F. Lent	R	NY-04	January 3, 1971	5th term	
155	Dawson Mathis	D	GA-02	January 3, 1971	5th term	Left the House in 1981.
156	Romano Mazzoli	D	KY-03	January 3, 1971	5th term	
157	Mike McCormack	D	WA-04	January 3, 1971	5th term	Left the House in 1981.
158	K. Gunn McKay	D	UT-01	January 3, 1971	5th term	Left the House in 1981.
159	Stewart McKinney	R	CT-04	January 3, 1971	5th term	
160	Parren Mitchell	D	MD-07	January 3, 1971	5th term	
161	Morgan F. Murphy	D	IL-02	January 3, 1971	5th term	Left the House in 1981.
162	Charles B. Rangel	D	NY-19	January 3, 1971	5th term	
163	J. Kenneth Robinson	R	VA-07	January 3, 1971	5th term	
164	Harold L. Runnels	D	NM-02	January 3, 1971	5th term	Died on August 5, 1980.
165	John F. Seiberling	D	OH-14	January 3, 1971	5th term	
166	Floyd Spence	R	SC-02	January 3, 1971	5th term	
167	Bill Young	R	FL-06	January 3, 1971	5th term	
168	Mendel Jackson Davis	D	SC-01	April 27, 1971	5th term	Left the House in 1981.
169	John Breaux	D	LA-07	September 30, 1972	5th term	
170	M. Caldwell Butler	R	VA-06	November 7, 1972	5th term	
171	James Abdnor	R	SD-02	January 3, 1973	4th term	Left the House in 1981.
172	Ike F. Andrews	D	NC-04	January 3, 1973	4th term	
173	Louis A. Bafalis	R	FL-10	January 3, 1973	4th term	
174	Robin Beard	R	TN-06	January 3, 1973	4th term	
175	David R. Bowen	D	MS-02	January 3, 1973	4th term	
176	George Brown Jr.	D	CA-36	January 3, 1973; Previous service, 1963–1971.	8th term*	
177	Clair Burgener	R	CA-43	January 3, 1973	4th term	
178	Robert Daniel	R	VA-04	January 3, 1973	4th term	
179	Benjamin A. Gilman	R	NY-26	January 3, 1973	4th term	
180	Ronald Ginn	D	GA-01	January 3, 1973	4th term	
181	Tennyson Guyer	R	OH-04	January 3, 1973	4th term	
182	Marjorie Holt	R	MD-04	January 3, 1973	4th term	
183	Elizabeth Holtzman	D	NY-16	January 3, 1973	4th term	Left the House in 1981.
184	James P. Johnson	R	CO-04	January 3, 1973	4th term	Left the House in 1981.
185	James Robert Jones	D	OK-01	January 3, 1973	4th term	
186	William Lehman	D	FL-13	January 3, 1973	4th term	
187	Gillis W. Long	D	LA-08	January 3, 1973; Previous service, 1963–1965.	5th term*	
188	Trent Lott	R	MS-05	January 3, 1973	4th term	
189	Edward Rell Madigan	R	IL-21	January 3, 1973	4th term	
190	James G. Martin	R	NC-09	January 3, 1973	4th term	
191	Donald J. Mitchell	R	NY-31	January 3, 1973	4th term	
192	Joe Moakley	D	MA-09	January 3, 1973	4th term	
193	Carlos Moorhead	R	CA-22	January 3, 1973	4th term	
194	George M. O'Brien	R	IL-17	January 3, 1973	4th term	
195	Joel Pritchard	R	WA-01	January 3, 1973	4th term	
196	Ralph Regula	R	OH-16	January 3, 1973	4th term	
197	Matthew John Rinaldo	R	NJ-12	January 3, 1973	4th term	
198	Charlie Rose	D	NC-07	January 3, 1973	4th term	
199	Patricia Schroeder	D	CO-01	January 3, 1973	4th term	
200	Bud Shuster	R	PA-09	January 3, 1973	4th term	
201	Pete Stark	D	CA-09	January 3, 1973	4th term	
202	Gerry Studds	D	MA-12	January 3, 1973	4th term	
203	Steve Symms	R	ID-01	January 3, 1973	4th term	Left the House in 1981.
204	Gene Taylor	R	MO-07	January 3, 1973	4th term	
205	David C. Treen	R	LA-03	January 3, 1973	4th term	Resigned on March 10, 1980.
206	Charles Wilson	D	TX-02	January 3, 1973	4th term	
207	Don Young	R	AK	March 6, 1973	4th term	
208	Lindy Boggs	D	LA-02	March 20, 1973	4th term	
209	Cardiss Collins	D	IL-07	June 5, 1973	4th term	
210	Robert Bauman	R	MD-01	August 21, 1973	4th term	Left the House in 1981.
211	John Murtha	D	PA-12	February 5, 1974	4th term	
212	Robert J. Lagomarsino	R	CA-19	March 5, 1974	4th term	
213	J. Bob Traxler	D	MI-08	April 23, 1974	4th term	
214	John L. Burton	D	CA-05	June 4, 1974	4th term	
215	Jerome Ambro	D	NY-03	January 3, 1975	3rd term	Left the House in 1981.
216	Les AuCoin	D	OR-01	January 3, 1975	3rd term	
217	Alvin Baldus	D	WI-03	January 3, 1975	3rd term	Left the House in 1981.
218	Edward Beard	D	RI-02	January 3, 1975	3rd term	Left the House in 1981.
219	Berkley Bedell	D	IA-06	January 3, 1975	3rd term	
220	James Blanchard	D	MI-18	January 3, 1975	3rd term	
221	Don Bonker	D	WA-03	January 3, 1975	3rd term	
222	William M. Brodhead	D	MI-17	January 3, 1975	3rd term	
223	Bob Carr	D	MI-06	January 3, 1975	3rd term	Left the House in 1981.
224	Butler Derrick	D	SC-03	January 3, 1975	3rd term	
225	Thomas Downey	D	NY-02	January 3, 1975	3rd term	
226	Chris Dodd	D	CT-02	January 3, 1975	3rd term	Left the House in 1981.
227	Norman D'Amours	D	NH-01	January 3, 1975	3rd term	
228	Robert B. Duncan	D	OR-03	January 3, 1975; Previous service, 1963–1967.	5th term*	Left the House in 1981.
229	Joseph D. Early	D	MA-03	January 3, 1975	3rd term	
230	Robert W. Edgar	D	PA-07	January 3, 1975	3rd term	
231	David F. Emery	R	ME-01	January 3, 1975	3rd term	
232	Glenn English	D	OK-06	January 3, 1975	3rd term	
233	David W. Evans	D	IN-06	January 3, 1975	3rd term	
234	Millicent Fenwick	R	NJ-05	January 3, 1975	3rd term	
235	Joseph L. Fisher	D	VA-10	January 3, 1975	3rd term	Left the House in 1981.
236	Floyd Fithian	D	IN-02	January 3, 1975	3rd term	
237	James Florio	D	NJ-01	January 3, 1975	3rd term	
238	Harold Ford	D	TN-08	January 3, 1975	3rd term	
239	Bill Goodling	R	PA-19	January 3, 1975	3rd term	
240	Bill Gradison	R	OH-01	January 3, 1975	3rd term	
241	Chuck Grassley	R	IA-03	January 3, 1975	3rd term	Left the House in 1981.
242	Tom Hagedorn	R	MN-02	January 3, 1975	3rd term	
243	George V. Hansen	R	ID-02	January 3, 1975; Previous service, 1965–1969.	5th term*	
244	Tom Harkin	D	IA-05	January 3, 1975	3rd term	
245	Herbert Harris	D	VA-08	January 3, 1975	3rd term	Left the House in 1981.
246	Bill Hefner	D	NC-08	January 3, 1975	3rd term	
247	Jack English Hightower	D	TX-13	January 3, 1975	3rd term	
248	Kenneth Lamar Holland	D	SC-05	January 3, 1975	3rd term	
249	Carroll Hubbard	D	KY-01	January 3, 1975	3rd term	
250	William Hughes	D	NJ-02	January 3, 1975	3rd term	
251	Henry Hyde	R	IL-06	January 3, 1975	3rd term	
252	Andrew Jacobs Jr.	D	IN-11	January 3, 1975; Previous service, 1965–1973.	7th term*	
253	Jim Jeffords	R	VT	January 3, 1975	3rd term	
254	John Jenrette	D	SC-06	January 3, 1975	3rd term	Resigned on December 10, 1980.
255	Richard Kelly	R	FL-05	January 3, 1975	3rd term	Left the House in 1981.
256	Tom Kindness	R	OH-08	January 3, 1975	3rd term	
257	John LaFalce	D	NY-36	January 3, 1975	3rd term	
258	Elliott H. Levitas	D	GA-04	January 3, 1975	3rd term	
259	James F. Lloyd	D	CA-35	January 3, 1975	3rd term	Left the House in 1981.
260	Marilyn Lloyd	D	TN-03	January 3, 1975	3rd term	
261	Andrew Maguire	D	NJ-07	January 3, 1975	3rd term	Left the House in 1981.
262	Larry McDonald	D	GA-07	January 3, 1975	3rd term	
263	Matthew F. McHugh	D	NY-27	January 3, 1975	3rd term	
264	George Miller	D	CA-07	January 3, 1975	3rd term	
265	Abner J. Mikva	D	IL-10	January 3, 1975; Previous service, 1969–1973.	5th term*	Resigned on September 26, 1979.
266	Norman Mineta	D	CA-13	January 3, 1975	3rd term	
267	Toby Moffett	D	CT-06	January 3, 1975	3rd term	
268	Henson Moore	R	LA-06	January 3, 1975	3rd term	
269	Ronald M. Mottl	D	OH-23	January 3, 1975	3rd term	
270	Stephen Neal	D	NC-05	January 3, 1975	3rd term	
271	Rick Nolan	D	MN-06	January 3, 1975	3rd term	Left the House in 1981.
272	Henry J. Nowak	D	NY-37	January 3, 1975	3rd term	
273	Jim Oberstar	D	MN-08	January 3, 1975	3rd term	
274	Richard Ottinger	D	NY-24	January 3, 1975; Previous service, 1965–1971.	6th term*	
275	Jerry M. Patterson	D	CA-38	January 3, 1975	3rd term	
276	Fred Richmond	D	NY-14	January 3, 1975	3rd term	
277	Marty Russo	D	IL-03	January 3, 1975	3rd term	
278	James David Santini	D	NV	January 3, 1975	3rd term	
279	James H. Scheuer	D	NY-11	January 3, 1975; Previous service, 1965–1973.	7th term*	
280	Richard T. Schulze	R	PA-05	January 3, 1975	3rd term	
281	Philip Sharp	D	IN-10	January 3, 1975	3rd term	
282	Paul Simon	D	IL-24	January 3, 1975	3rd term	
283	Virginia D. Smith	R	NE-03	January 3, 1975	3rd term	
284	Stephen J. Solarz	D	NY-13	January 3, 1975	3rd term	
285	Gladys Spellman	D	MD-05	January 3, 1975	3rd term	
286	Henry Waxman	D	CA-24	January 3, 1975	3rd term	
287	Jim Weaver	D	OR-04	January 3, 1975	3rd term	
288	Tim Wirth	D	CO-02	January 3, 1975	3rd term	
289	Leo C. Zeferetti	D	NY-15	January 3, 1975	3rd term	
290	John G. Fary	D	IL-05	July 8, 1975	3rd term	
291	Stan Lundine	D	NY-39	March 2, 1976	3rd term	
292	Sam B. Hall Jr.	D	TX-01	June 19, 1976	3rd term	
293	Earl Thomas Coleman	R	MO-06	November 2, 1976	3rd term	
294	Ed Markey	D	MA-07	November 2, 1976	3rd term	
295	Michael Myers	D	PA-01	November 2, 1976	3rd term	Resigned on October 2, 1980.
296	Daniel Akaka	D	HI-02	January 3, 1977	2nd term	
297	Douglas Applegate	D	OH-18	January 3, 1977	2nd term	
298	Robert Badham	R	CA-40	January 3, 1977	2nd term	
299	Doug Barnard Jr.	D	GA-10	January 3, 1977	2nd term	
300	Anthony C. Beilenson	D	CA-23	January 3, 1977	2nd term	
301	Adam Benjamin Jr.	D	IN-01	January 3, 1977	2nd term	
302	David Bonior	D	MI-12	January 3, 1977	2nd term	
303	John Joseph Cavanaugh III	D	NE-02	January 3, 1977	2nd term	Left the House in 1981.
304	Tom Corcoran	R	IL-15	January 3, 1977	2nd term	
305	Norm Dicks	D	WA-06	January 3, 1977	2nd term	
306	Bob Dornan	R	CA-27	January 3, 1977	2nd term	
307	Mickey Edwards	R	OK-05	January 3, 1977	2nd term	
308	Allen E. Ertel	D	PA-17	January 3, 1977	2nd term	
309	Billy Lee Evans	D	GA-08	January 3, 1977	2nd term	
310	Thomas B. Evans Jr.	R	DE	January 3, 1977	2nd term	
311	Ronnie Flippo	D	AL-05	January 3, 1977	2nd term	
312	Dick Gephardt	D	MO-03	January 3, 1977	2nd term	
313	Dan Glickman	D	KS-04	January 3, 1977	2nd term	
314	Al Gore	D	TN-04	January 3, 1977	2nd term	
315	V. Lamar Gudger	D	NC-11	January 3, 1977	2nd term	Left the House in 1981.
316	Cecil Heftel	D	HI-01	January 3, 1977	2nd term	
317	Harold C. Hollenbeck	R	NJ-09	January 3, 1977	2nd term	
318	Jerry Huckaby	D	LA-05	January 3, 1977	2nd term	
319	Andy Ireland	D	FL-08	January 3, 1977	2nd term	
320	Ed Jenkins	D	GA-09	January 3, 1977	2nd term	
321	Dale Kildee	D	MI-07	January 3, 1977	2nd term	
322	Peter H. Kostmayer	D	PA-08	January 3, 1977	2nd term	Left the House in 1981.
323	Jim Leach	R	IA-01	January 3, 1977	2nd term	
324	Raymond F. Lederer	D	PA-03	January 3, 1977	2nd term	
325	Tom Luken	D	OH-02	January 3, 1977; Previous service, 1974–1975.	3rd term*	
326	Marc L. Marks	R	PA-24	January 3, 1977	2nd term	
327	Ron Marlenee	R	MT-02	January 3, 1977	2nd term	
328	David D. Marriott	R	UT-02	January 3, 1977	2nd term	
329	Jim Mattox	D	TX-05	January 3, 1977	2nd term	
330	Barbara Mikulski	D	MD-03	January 3, 1977	2nd term	
331	Austin Murphy	D	PA-22	January 3, 1977	2nd term	
332	Mary Rose Oakar	D	OH-20	January 3, 1977	2nd term	
333	Leon Panetta	D	CA-16	January 3, 1977	2nd term	
334	Donald J. Pease	D	OH-13	January 3, 1977	2nd term	
335	Carl Pursell	R	MI-02	January 3, 1977	2nd term	
336	Dan Quayle	R	IN-04	January 3, 1977	2nd term	Left the House in 1981.
337	Nick Rahall	D	WV-04	January 3, 1977	2nd term	
338	Eldon Rudd	R	AZ-04	January 3, 1977	2nd term	
339	Harold S. Sawyer	R	MI-05	January 3, 1977	2nd term	
340	Ike Skelton	D	MO-04	January 3, 1977	2nd term	
341	David Stockman	R	MI-04	January 3, 1977	2nd term	
342	Bob Stump	D	AZ-03	January 3, 1977	2nd term	
343	Paul S. Trible Jr.	R	VA-01	January 3, 1977	2nd term	
344	Bruce Vento	D	MN-04	January 3, 1977	2nd term	
345	Harold Volkmer	D	MO-09	January 3, 1977	2nd term	
346	Doug Walgren	D	PA-18	January 3, 1977	2nd term	
347	Robert Walker	R	PA-16	January 3, 1977	2nd term	
348	Wes Watkins	D	OK-03	January 3, 1977	2nd term	
349	Theodore S. Weiss	D	NY-20	January 3, 1977	2nd term	
350	Charles Whitley	D	NC-03	January 3, 1977	2nd term	
351	Robert A. Young	D	MO-02	January 3, 1977	2nd term	
352	Arlan Stangeland	R	MN-07	February 22, 1977	2nd term	
353	Wyche Fowler	D	GA-05	April 6, 1977	2nd term	
354	Bob Livingston	R	LA-01	August 27, 1977	2nd term	
355	S. William Green	R	NY-18	February 14, 1978	2nd term	
356	Robert Garcia	D	NY-21	February 21, 1978	2nd term	
357	Donald J. Albosta	D	MI-10	January 3, 1979	1st term	
358	Eugene Atkinson	D	PA-25	January 3, 1979	1st term	
359	Beryl Anthony Jr.	D	AR-04	January 3, 1979	1st term	
360	Donald A. Bailey	D	PA-21	January 3, 1979	1st term	
361	Michael D. Barnes	D	MD-08	January 3, 1979	1st term	
362	Doug Bereuter	R	NE-01	January 3, 1979	1st term	
363	Ed Bethune	R	AR-02	January 3, 1979	1st term	
364	Bill Boner	D	TN-05	January 3, 1979	1st term	
365	Beverly Byron	D	MD-06	January 3, 1979	1st term	
366	Carroll A. Campbell Jr.	R	SC-04	January 3, 1979	1st term	
367	William Carney	R	NY-01	January 3, 1979	1st term	
368	Dick Cheney	R	WY	January 3, 1979	1st term	
369	Bill Clinger	R	PA-23	January 3, 1979	1st term	
370	Tony Coelho	D	CA-15	January 3, 1979	1st term	
371	Jim Courter	R	NJ-13	January 3, 1979	1st term	
372	Dan Crane	R	IL-22	January 3, 1979	1st term	
373	William E. Dannemeyer	R	CA-39	January 3, 1979	1st term	
374	Thomas Daschle	D	SD-01	January 3, 1979	1st term	
375	Robert William Davis	R	MI-11	January 3, 1979	1st term	
376	H. Joel Deckard	R	IN-08	January 3, 1979	1st term	
377	Julian C. Dixon	D	CA-28	January 3, 1979	1st term	
378	Brian J. Donnelly	D	MA-11	January 3, 1979	1st term	
379	Charles F. Dougherty	R	PA-04	January 3, 1979	1st term	
380	Arlen Erdahl	R	MN-01	January 3, 1979	1st term	
381	Vic Fazio	D	CA-04	January 3, 1979	1st term	
382	Geraldine Ferraro	D	NY-09	January 3, 1979	1st term	
383	Martin Frost	D	TX-24	January 3, 1979	1st term	
384	Newt Gingrich	R	GA-06	January 3, 1979	1st term	
385	Phil Gramm	D	TX-06	January 3, 1979	1st term	
386	William H. Gray	D	PA-02	January 3, 1979	1st term	
387	Wayne R. Grisham	R	CA-33	January 3, 1979	1st term	
388	Frank Joseph Guarini	D	NJ-14	January 3, 1979	1st term	
389	Tony Hall	D	OH-03	January 3, 1979	1st term	
390	Kent Hance	D	TX-19	January 3, 1979	1st term	
391	Jon Hinson	R	MS-04	January 3, 1979	1st term	
392	Larry J. Hopkins	R	KY-06	January 3, 1979	1st term	
393	Earl Dewitt Hutto	D	FL-01	January 3, 1979	1st term	
394	James Edmund Jeffries	R	KS-02	January 3, 1979	1st term	
395	Raymond P. Kogovsek	D	CO-03	January 3, 1979	1st term	
396	Ken Kramer	R	CO-05	January 3, 1979	1st term	
397	Buddy Leach	D	LA-04	January 3, 1979	1st term	Left the House in 1981.
398	Marvin Leath	D	TX-11	January 3, 1979	1st term	
399	Gary A. Lee	R	NY-33	January 3, 1979	1st term	
400	Mickey Leland	D	TX-18	January 3, 1979	1st term	
401	Jerry Lewis	R	CA-37	January 3, 1979	1st term	
402	Tom Loeffler	R	TX-21	January 3, 1979	1st term	
403	Mike Lowry	D	WA-07	January 3, 1979	1st term	
404	Dan Lungren	R	CA-34	January 3, 1979	1st term	
405	Nicholas Mavroules	D	MA-06	January 3, 1979	1st term	
406	Bob Matsui	D	CA-03	January 3, 1979	1st term	
407	Dan Mica	D	FL-11	January 3, 1979	1st term	
408	Bill Nelson	D	FL-09	January 3, 1979	1st term	
409	Chip Pashayan	R	CA-17	January 3, 1979	1st term	
410	Peter A. Peyser	D	NY-23	January 3, 1979; Previous service, 1971–1977.	4th term*	
411	Ron Paul	R	TX-22	January 3, 1979; Previous service, 1976–1977.	2nd term*	
412	William R. Ratchford	D	CT-05	January 3, 1979	1st term	
413	Donald L. Ritter	R	PA-15	January 3, 1979	1st term	
414	Toby Roth	R	WI-08	January 3, 1979	1st term	
415	Martin Olav Sabo	D	MN-05	January 3, 1979	1st term	
416	James Sensenbrenner	R	WI-09	January 3, 1979	1st term	
417	James Shannon	D	MA-05	January 3, 1979	1st term	
418	Richard Shelby	D	AL-07	January 3, 1979	1st term	
419	Norman D. Shumway	R	CA-14	January 3, 1979	1st term	
420	Olympia Snowe	R	ME-02	January 3, 1979	1st term	
421	Gerald Solomon	R	NY-29	January 3, 1979	1st term	
422	Edward J. Stack	D	FL-12	January 3, 1979	1st term	Left the House in 1981.
423	Charles Stenholm	D	TX-17	January 3, 1979	1st term	
424	Bennett M. Stewart	D	IL-01	January 3, 1979	1st term	Left the House in 1981.
425	Al Swift	D	WA-02	January 3, 1979	1st term	
426	Mike Synar	D	OK-02	January 3, 1979	1st term	
427	Tom Tauke	R	IA-02	January 3, 1979	1st term	
428	Bill Thomas	R	CA-18	January 3, 1979	1st term	
429	Bob Whittaker	R	KS-05	January 3, 1979	1st term	
430	Pat Williams	D	MT-01	January 3, 1979	1st term	
431	Lyle Williams	R	OH-19	January 3, 1979	1st term	
432	Howard Wolpe	D	MI-03	January 3, 1979	1st term	
433	Joseph P. Wyatt Jr.	D	TX-14	January 3, 1979	1st term	Left the House in 1981.
434	Tom Petri	R	WI-06	April 3, 1979	1st term	
	William Royer	R	CA-11	April 3, 1979	1st term	Left the House in 1981.
	John Porter	R	IL-10	January 22, 1980	1st term	
	Ray Musto	D	PA-11	April 9, 1980	1st term	Left the House in 1981.
	Billy Tauzin	D	LA-03	May 22, 1980	1st term	
	John G. Hutchinson	D	WV-03	June 3, 1980	1st term	Left the House in 1981.
	George W. Crockett Jr.	D	MI-13	November 4, 1980	1st term	

== Delegates ==
Rank	Delegate	Party	District	Seniority date (Previous service, if any)	No.# of term(s)	Notes
1	Walter E. Fauntroy	D	DC	March 23, 1971	5th term	
2	Antonio Borja Won Pat	D	GU	January 3, 1973	4th term	
3	Baltasar Corrada del Río	D	PR	January 3, 1977	2nd term	
4	Melvin H. Evans	R	VI	January 3, 1979	1st term	

== See also ==
- 96th United States Congress
- List of United States congressional districts
- List of United States senators in the 96th Congress
