= List of United States representatives in the 95th Congress =

This is a complete list of United States representatives during the 95th United States Congress listed by seniority.

As an historical article, the districts and party affiliations listed reflect those during the 95th Congress (January 3, 1977 – January 3, 1979). Seats and party affiliations on similar lists for other congresses will be different for certain members.

Seniority depends on the date on which members were sworn into office. Since many members are sworn in on the same day, subsequent ranking is based on previous congressional service of the individual and then by alphabetical order by the last name of the representative.

Committee chairmanship in the House is often associated with seniority. However, party leadership is typically not associated with seniority.

Note: The "*" indicates that the representative/delegate may have served one or more non-consecutive terms while in the House of Representatives of the United States Congress.

== U.S. House seniority list ==
U.S. House seniority
Rank	Representative	Party	District	Seniority date (Previous service, if any)	No.# of term(s)	Notes
1	George H. Mahon	D	TX-19	January 3, 1935	22nd term	Dean of the House; Left the House in 1979.
2	William R. Poage	D	TX-11	January 3, 1937	21st term	Resigned on December 31, 1978.
3	Jamie Whitten	D	MS-01	November 4, 1941	19th term	
4	Charles Melvin Price	D	IL-23	January 3, 1945	17th term	
5	Robert L. F. Sikes	D	FL-01	January 3, 1945; Previous service, 1941–1944.	19th term*	Left the House in 1979.
6	Olin E. Teague	D	TX-06	August 24, 1946	17th term	Resigned on December 31, 1978.
7	Omar Burleson	D	TX-17	January 3, 1947	16th term	Resigned on December 31, 1978.
8	Charles Edward Bennett	D	FL-03	January 3, 1949	15th term	
9	Richard Walker Bolling	D	MO-05	January 3, 1949	15th term	
10	James J. Delaney	D	NY-09	January 3, 1949; Previous service, 1945–1947.	16th term*	Resigned on December 31, 1978.
11	Carl D. Perkins	D	KY-07	January 3, 1949	15th term	
12	Peter W. Rodino	D	NJ-10	January 3, 1949	15th term	
13	Harley Orrin Staggers	D	WV-02	January 3, 1949	15th term	
14	Tom Steed	D	OK-04	January 3, 1949	15th term	
15	Clement J. Zablocki	D	WI-04	January 3, 1949	15th term	
16	Edward Boland	D	MA-02	January 3, 1953	13th term	
17	Jack Brooks	D	TX-09	January 3, 1953	13th term	
18	Elford Albin Cederberg	R	MI-10	January 3, 1953	13th term	Resigned on December 31, 1978.
19	Lawrence H. Fountain	D	NC-02	January 3, 1953	13th term	
20	John E. Moss	D	CA-03	January 3, 1953	13th term	Resigned on December 31, 1978.
21	Tip O'Neill	D	MA-08	January 3, 1953	13th term	Speaker of the House
22	John J. Rhodes	R	AZ-01	January 3, 1953	13th term	
23	Bob Wilson	R	CA-41	January 3, 1953	13th term	
24	William Natcher	D	KY-02	August 1, 1953	13th term	
25	John James Flynt Jr.	D	GA-06	November 2, 1954	13th term	Left the House in 1979.
26	Thomas W. L. Ashley	D	OH-09	January 3, 1955	12th term	
27	Charles Diggs	D	MI-13	January 3, 1955	12th term	
28	Dante Fascell	D	FL-15	January 3, 1955	12th term	
29	Daniel J. Flood	D	PA-11	January 3, 1955; Previous service, 1945–1947 and 1949–1953.	15th term**	
30	Henry S. Reuss	D	WI-05	January 3, 1955	12th term	
31	Bernice F. Sisk	D	CA-15	January 3, 1955	12th term	Left the House in 1979.
32	Frank Thompson	D	NJ-04	January 3, 1955	12th term	
33	Charles Vanik	D	OH-22	January 3, 1955	12th term	
34	Jim Wright	D	TX-12	January 3, 1955	12th term	
35	Paul Rogers	D	FL-11	January 11, 1955	12th term	Left the House in 1979.
36	John Dingell	D	MI-16	December 13, 1955	12th term	
37	William Broomfield	R	MI-19	January 3, 1957	11th term	
38	John J. McFall	D	CA-14	January 3, 1957	11th term	Resigned on December 31, 1978.
39	Robert Michel	R	IL-18	January 3, 1957	11th term	
40	Al Ullman	D	OR-02	January 3, 1957	11th term	
41	John Andrew Young	D	TX-14	January 3, 1957	11th term	Left the House in 1979.
42	John Herman Dent	D	PA-21	January 21, 1958	11th term	Left the House in 1979.
43	Al Quie	R	MN-01	February 18, 1958	11th term	Left the House in 1979.
44	Robert N.C. Nix Sr.	D	PA-02	May 20, 1958	11th term	Left the House in 1979.
45	John Brademas	D	IN-03	January 3, 1959	10th term	
46	James A. Burke	D	MA-11	January 3, 1959	10th term	Left the House in 1979.
47	Silvio O. Conte	R	MA-01	January 3, 1959	10th term	
48	Ed Derwinski	R	IL-04	January 3, 1959	10th term	
49	Samuel L. Devine	R	OH-12	January 3, 1959	10th term	
50	Robert Giaimo	D	CT-03	January 3, 1959	10th term	
51	Harold T. Johnson	D	CA-01	January 3, 1959	10th term	
52	Robert Kastenmeier	D	WI-02	January 3, 1959	10th term	
53	Del Latta	R	OH-05	January 3, 1959	10th term	
54	William S. Moorhead	D	PA-14	January 3, 1959	10th term	
55	Dan Rostenkowski	D	IL-08	January 3, 1959	10th term	
56	George E. Shipley	D	IL-22	January 3, 1959	10th term	Left the House in 1979.
57	John M. Slack Jr.	D	WV-03	January 3, 1959	10th term	
58	Neal Smith	D	IA-04	January 3, 1959	10th term	
59	Samuel S. Stratton	D	NY-28	January 3, 1959	10th term	
60	Joseph Patrick Addabbo	D	NY-07	January 3, 1961	9th term	
61	John B. Anderson	R	IL-16	January 3, 1961	9th term	
62	John M. Ashbrook	R	OH-17	January 3, 1961	9th term	
63	James C. Corman	D	CA-21	January 3, 1961	9th term	
64	Paul Findley	R	IL-20	January 3, 1961	9th term	
65	Fernand St. Germain	D	RI-01	January 3, 1961	9th term	
66	Bill Harsha	R	OH-06	January 3, 1961	9th term	
67	Richard Howard Ichord Jr.	D	MO-08	January 3, 1961	9th term	
68	Otis G. Pike	D	NY-01	January 3, 1961	9th term	Left the House in 1979.
69	Mo Udall	D	AZ-02	May 2, 1961	9th term	
70	Henry B. González	D	TX-20	November 4, 1961	9th term	
71	Lucien N. Nedzi	D	MI-14	November 7, 1961	9th term	
72	Joe Waggonner	D	LA-04	December 19, 1961	9th term	Left the House in 1979.
73	Ray Roberts	D	TX-04	January 30, 1962	9th term	
74	Benjamin S. Rosenthal	D	NY-08	February 20, 1962	9th term	
75	Jim Broyhill	R	NC-10	January 3, 1963	8th term	
76	Don H. Clausen	R	CA-02	January 3, 1963	8th term	
77	James Colgate Cleveland	R	NH-02	January 3, 1963	8th term	
78	Lionel Van Deerlin	D	CA-42	January 3, 1963	8th term	
79	Don Edwards	D	CA-10	January 3, 1963	8th term	
80	Donald M. Fraser	D	MN-05	January 3, 1963	8th term	Left the House in 1979.
81	Don Fuqua	D	FL-02	January 3, 1963	8th term	
82	Sam Gibbons	D	FL-07	January 3, 1963	8th term	
83	Augustus F. Hawkins	D	CA-29	January 3, 1963	8th term	
84	Frank Horton	R	NY-34	January 3, 1963	8th term	
85	Robert L. Leggett	D	CA-04	January 3, 1963	8th term	Left the House in 1979.
86	Clarence Long	D	MD-02	January 3, 1963	8th term	
87	Robert McClory	R	IL-13	January 3, 1963	8th term	
88	Joseph McDade	R	PA-10	January 3, 1963	8th term	
89	Joseph Minish	D	NJ-11	January 3, 1963	8th term	
90	John M. Murphy	D	NY-17	January 3, 1963	8th term	
91	Edward J. Patten	D	NJ-15	January 3, 1963	8th term	
92	Claude Pepper	D	FL-14	January 3, 1963	8th term	
93	Jimmy Quillen	R	TN-01	January 3, 1963	8th term	
94	Edward R. Roybal	D	CA-25	January 3, 1963	8th term	
95	Joe Skubitz	R	KS-05	January 3, 1963	8th term	Resigned on December 31, 1978.
96	Charles H. Wilson	D	CA-31	January 3, 1963	8th term	
97	John W. Wydler	R	NY-05	January 3, 1963	8th term	
98	Del M. Clawson	R	CA-33	June 11, 1963	8th term	Resigned on December 31, 1978.
99	Fred B. Rooney	D	PA-15	July 30, 1963	8th term	Left the House in 1979.
100	Mark Andrews	R	ND	October 22, 1963	8th term	
101	J. J. Pickle	D	TX-10	December 21, 1963	8th term	
102	Phillip Burton	D	CA-06	February 18, 1964	8th term	
103	Brock Adams	D	WA-07	January 3, 1965	7th term	Resigned on January 22, 1977.
104	Frank Annunzio	D	IL-11	January 3, 1965	7th term	
105	Jonathan Brewster Bingham	D	NY-22	January 3, 1965	7th term	
106	John Hall Buchanan Jr.	R	AL-06	January 3, 1965	7th term	
107	Tim Lee Carter	R	KY-05	January 3, 1965	7th term	
108	Barber Conable	R	NY-35	January 3, 1965	7th term	
109	John Conyers	D	MI-01	January 3, 1965	7th term	
110	Bill Dickinson	R	AL-02	January 3, 1965	7th term	
111	John Duncan Sr.	R	TN-02	January 3, 1965	7th term	
112	Jack Edwards	R	AL-01	January 3, 1965	7th term	
113	John N. Erlenborn	R	IL-14	January 3, 1965	7th term	
114	Frank Evans	D	CO-03	January 3, 1965	7th term	Left the House in 1979.
115	Tom Foley	D	WA-05	January 3, 1965	7th term	
116	William Ford	D	MI-15	January 3, 1965	7th term	
117	Kika De la Garza	D	TX-15	January 3, 1965	7th term	
118	Lee Hamilton	D	IN-09	January 3, 1965	7th term	
119	James M. Hanley	D	NY-32	January 3, 1965	7th term	
120	James J. Howard	D	NJ-03	January 3, 1965	7th term	
121	Robert C. McEwen	R	NY-30	January 3, 1965	7th term	
122	Lloyd Meeds	D	WA-02	January 3, 1965	7th term	Left the House in 1979.
123	David E. Satterfield III	D	VA-03	January 3, 1965	7th term	
124	J. William Stanton	R	OH-11	January 3, 1965	7th term	
125	Sidney Yates	D	IL-09	January 3, 1965; Previous service, 1949–1963.	14th term*	
126	Richard Crawford White	D	TX-16	January 3, 1965	7th term	
127	Lester L. Wolff	D	NY-06	January 3, 1965	7th term	
128	Clarence Brown Jr.	R	OH-07	November 2, 1965	7th term	
129	Walter B. Jones Sr.	D	NC-01	February 5, 1966	7th term	
130	Guy Vander Jagt	R	MI-09	November 8, 1966	7th term	
131	Tom Bevill	D	AL-04	January 3, 1967	6th term	
132	Jack Thomas Brinkley	D	GA-03	January 3, 1967	6th term	
133	Garry E. Brown	R	MI-03	January 3, 1967	6th term	Left the House in 1979.
134	J. Herbert Burke	R	FL-12	January 3, 1967	6th term	Left the House in 1979.
135	Robert C. Eckhardt	D	TX-08	January 3, 1967	6th term	
136	Joshua Eilberg	D	PA-04	January 3, 1967	6th term	Left the House in 1979.
137	John Paul Hammerschmidt	R	AR-03	January 3, 1967	6th term	
138	Margaret Heckler	R	MA-10	January 3, 1967	6th term	
139	Abraham Kazen	D	TX-23	January 3, 1967	6th term	
140	Clarence E. Miller	R	OH-10	January 3, 1967	6th term	
141	Sonny Montgomery	D	MS-03	January 3, 1967	6th term	
142	John Myers	R	IN-07	January 3, 1967	6th term	
143	Bill Nichols	D	AL-03	January 3, 1967	6th term	
144	Tom Railsback	R	IL-19	January 3, 1967	6th term	
145	Philip Ruppe	R	MI-11	January 3, 1967	6th term	Left the House in 1979.
146	Gene Snyder	R	KY-04	January 3, 1967; Previous service, 1963–1965.	7th term*	
147	William A. Steiger	R	WI-06	January 3, 1967	6th term	Died on December 4, 1978.
148	William C. Wampler	R	VA-09	January 3, 1967; Previous service, 1953–1955.	7th term*	
149	Charles W. Whalen Jr.	R	OH-03	January 3, 1967	6th term	Left the House in 1979.
150	Charles E. Wiggins	R	CA-39	January 3, 1967	6th term	Left the House in 1979.
151	Larry Winn	R	KS-03	January 3, 1967	6th term	
152	Chalmers Wylie	R	OH-15	January 3, 1967	6th term	
153	Pete McCloskey	R	CA-12	December 12, 1967	6th term	
154	James M. Collins	R	TX-03	August 24, 1968	6th term	
155	Joseph M. Gaydos	D	PA-20	November 5, 1968	6th term	
156	Bill Alexander	D	AR-01	January 3, 1969	5th term	
157	Glenn M. Anderson	D	CA-32	January 3, 1969	5th term	
158	Mario Biaggi	D	NY-10	January 3, 1969	5th term	
159	Bill Burlison	D	MO-10	January 3, 1969	5th term	
160	William V. Chappell Jr.	D	FL-04	January 3, 1969	5th term	
161	Shirley Chisholm	D	NY-12	January 3, 1969	5th term	
162	Bill Clay	D	MO-01	January 3, 1969	5th term	
163	Lawrence Coughlin	R	PA-13	January 3, 1969	5th term	
164	Dan Daniel	D	VA-05	January 3, 1969	5th term	
165	Hamilton Fish	R	NY-25	January 3, 1969	5th term	
166	Walter Flowers	D	AL-07	January 3, 1969	5th term	Left the House in 1979.
167	Lou Frey	R	FL-09	January 3, 1969	5th term	Left the House in 1979.
168	Ed Koch	D	NY-18	January 3, 1969	5th term	Resigned on December 31, 1977.
169	Manuel Lujan Jr.	R	NM-01	January 3, 1969	5th term	
170	James Robert Mann	D	SC-04	January 3, 1969	5th term	Left the House in 1979.
171	Bob Mollohan	D	WV-01	January 3, 1969; Previous service, 1953–1957.	7th term*	
172	L. Richardson Preyer	D	NC-06	January 3, 1969	5th term	
173	Keith Sebelius	R	KS-01	January 3, 1969	5th term	
174	Louis Stokes	D	OH-21	January 3, 1969	5th term	
175	G. William Whitehurst	R	VA-02	January 3, 1969	5th term	
176	Gus Yatron	D	PA-06	January 3, 1969	5th term	
177	Ed Jones	D	TN-07	March 25, 1969	5th term	
178	Dave Obey	D	WI-07	April 1, 1969	5th term	
179	Barry Goldwater Jr.	R	CA-20	April 29, 1969	5th term	
180	Michael J. Harrington	D	MA-06	September 30, 1969	5th term	Left the House in 1979.
181	Robert A. Roe	D	NJ-08	November 4, 1969	5th term	
182	Phil Crane	R	IL-12	November 25, 1969	5th term	
183	John H. Rousselot	R	CA-26	June 30, 1970; Previous service, 1961–1963.	6th term*	
184	Charles J. Carney	D	OH-19	November 3, 1970	5th term	Left the House in 1979.
185	Edwin B. Forsythe	R	NJ-06	November 3, 1970	5th term	
186	Bill Archer	R	TX-07	January 3, 1971	4th term	
187	Les Aspin	D	WI-01	January 3, 1971	4th term	
188	Herman Badillo	D	NY-21	January 3, 1971	4th term	Resigned on December 31, 1977.
189	Robert Bergland	D	MN-07	January 3, 1971	4th term	Resigned on January 22, 1977.
190	Goodloe Byron	D	MD-06	January 3, 1971	4th term	Died on October 11, 1978.
191	William R. Cotter	D	CT-01	January 3, 1971	4th term	
192	George E. Danielson	D	CA-30	January 3, 1971	4th term	
193	Ron Dellums	D	CA-08	January 3, 1971	4th term	
194	Robert Drinan	D	MA-04	January 3, 1971	4th term	
195	Bill Frenzel	R	MN-03	January 3, 1971	4th term	
196	Elwood Hillis	R	IN-05	January 3, 1971	4th term	
197	Jack Kemp	R	NY-38	January 3, 1971	4th term	
198	Norman F. Lent	R	NY-04	January 3, 1971	4th term	
199	Dawson Mathis	D	GA-02	January 3, 1971	4th term	
200	Romano Mazzoli	D	KY-03	January 3, 1971	4th term	
201	Mike McCormack	D	WA-04	January 3, 1971	4th term	
202	K. Gunn McKay	D	UT-01	January 3, 1971	4th term	
203	Stewart McKinney	R	CT-04	January 3, 1971	4th term	
204	Ralph Metcalfe	D	IL-01	January 3, 1971	4th term	Died on October 10, 1978.
205	Parren Mitchell	D	MD-07	January 3, 1971	4th term	
206	Morgan F. Murphy	D	IL-02	January 3, 1971	4th term	
207	Charles B. Rangel	D	NY-19	January 3, 1971	4th term	
208	J. Kenneth Robinson	R	VA-07	January 3, 1971	4th term	
209	Teno Roncalio	D	WY	January 3, 1971; Previous service, 1965–1967.	5th term*	Resigned on December 30, 1978.
210	Harold L. Runnels	D	NM-02	January 3, 1971	4th term	
211	John F. Seiberling	D	OH-14	January 3, 1971	4th term	
212	Floyd Spence	R	SC-02	January 3, 1971	4th term	
213	Charles Thone	R	NE-01	January 3, 1971	4th term	Left the House in 1979.
214	Bill Young	R	FL-06	January 3, 1971	4th term	
215	Mendel Jackson Davis	D	SC-01	April 27, 1971	4th term	
216	John Breaux	D	LA-07	September 30, 1972	4th term	
217	M. Caldwell Butler	R	VA-06	November 7, 1972	4th term	
218	James Abdnor	R	SD-02	January 3, 1973	3rd term	
219	Ike F. Andrews	D	NC-04	January 3, 1973	3rd term	
220	William L. Armstrong	R	CO-05	January 3, 1973	3rd term	Left the House in 1979.
221	Louis A. Bafalis	R	FL-10	January 3, 1973	3rd term	
222	Robin Beard	R	TN-06	January 3, 1973	3rd term	
223	David R. Bowen	D	MS-02	January 3, 1973	3rd term	
224	John B. Breckinridge	D	KY-06	January 3, 1973	3rd term	Left the House in 1979.
225	George Brown Jr.	D	CA-36	January 3, 1973; Previous service, 1963–1971.	7th term*	
226	Clair Burgener	R	CA-43	January 3, 1973	3rd term	
227	Yvonne B. Burke	D	CA-28	January 3, 1973	3rd term	Left the House in 1979.
228	Thad Cochran	R	MS-04	January 3, 1973	3rd term	Resigned on December 26, 1978.
229	William Cohen	R	ME-02	January 3, 1973	3rd term	Left the House in 1979.
230	Robert Daniel	R	VA-04	January 3, 1973	3rd term	
231	Benjamin A. Gilman	R	NY-26	January 3, 1973	3rd term	
232	Ronald Ginn	D	GA-01	January 3, 1973	3rd term	
233	Tennyson Guyer	R	OH-04	January 3, 1973	3rd term	
234	Marjorie Holt	R	MD-04	January 3, 1973	3rd term	
235	Elizabeth Holtzman	D	NY-16	January 3, 1973	3rd term	
236	James P. Johnson	R	CO-04	January 3, 1973	3rd term	
237	James Robert Jones	D	OK-01	January 3, 1973	3rd term	
238	Barbara Jordan	D	TX-18	January 3, 1973	3rd term	Left the House in 1979.
239	William M. Ketchum	D	CA-18	January 3, 1973	3rd term	Died on June 24, 1978.
240	William Lehman	D	FL-13	January 3, 1973	3rd term	
241	Gillis W. Long	D	LA-08	January 3, 1973; Previous service, 1963–1965.	4th term*	
242	Trent Lott	R	MS-05	January 3, 1973	3rd term	
243	Edward Rell Madigan	R	IL-21	January 3, 1973	3rd term	
244	James G. Martin	R	NC-09	January 3, 1973	3rd term	
245	Dale Milford	D	TX-24	January 3, 1973	3rd term	Left the House in 1979.
246	Donald J. Mitchell	R	NY-31	January 3, 1973	3rd term	
247	Joe Moakley	D	MA-09	January 3, 1973	3rd term	
248	Carlos Moorhead	R	CA-22	January 3, 1973	3rd term	
249	George M. O'Brien	R	IL-17	January 3, 1973	3rd term	
250	Joel Pritchard	R	WA-01	January 3, 1973	3rd term	
251	Ralph Regula	R	OH-16	January 3, 1973	3rd term	
252	Matthew John Rinaldo	R	NJ-12	January 3, 1973	3rd term	
253	Charlie Rose	D	NC-07	January 3, 1973	3rd term	
254	Leo Ryan	D	CA-11	January 3, 1973	3rd term	Died on November 18, 1978.
255	Ronald A. Sarasin	R	CT-05	January 3, 1973	3rd term	Left the House in 1979.
256	Patricia Schroeder	D	CO-01	January 3, 1973	3rd term	
257	Bud Shuster	R	PA-09	January 3, 1973	3rd term	
258	Pete Stark	D	CA-09	January 3, 1973	3rd term	
259	Gerry Studds	D	MA-12	January 3, 1973	3rd term	
260	Steve Symms	R	ID-01	January 3, 1973	3rd term	
261	Gene Taylor	R	MO-07	January 3, 1973	3rd term	
262	Ray Thornton	D	AR-04	January 3, 1973	3rd term	Left the House in 1979.
263	David C. Treen	R	LA-03	January 3, 1973	3rd term	
264	William F. Walsh	R	NY-33	January 3, 1973	3rd term	Left the House in 1979.
265	Charles Wilson	D	TX-02	January 3, 1973	3rd term	
266	Andrew Young	D	GA-05	January 3, 1973	3rd term	Resigned on January 29, 1977.
267	Don Young	R	AK	March 6, 1973	3rd term	
268	Lindy Boggs	D	LA-02	March 20, 1973	3rd term	
269	Cardiss Collins	D	IL-07	June 5, 1973	3rd term	
270	Robert Bauman	R	MD-01	August 21, 1973	3rd term	
271	John Murtha	D	PA-12	February 5, 1974	3rd term	
272	Robert J. Lagomarsino	R	CA-19	March 5, 1974	3rd term	
273	J. Bob Traxler	D	MI-08	April 23, 1974	3rd term	
274	John L. Burton	D	CA-05	June 4, 1974	3rd term	
275	Jerome Ambro	D	NY-03	January 3, 1975	2nd term	
276	Les AuCoin	D	OR-01	January 3, 1975	2nd term	
277	Alvin Baldus	D	WI-03	January 3, 1975	2nd term	
278	Max Baucus	D	MT-01	January 3, 1975	2nd term	Resigned on December 14, 1978.
279	Edward Beard	D	RI-02	January 3, 1975	2nd term	
280	Berkley Bedell	D	IA-06	January 3, 1975	2nd term	
281	James Blanchard	D	MI-18	January 3, 1975	2nd term	
282	Mike Blouin	D	IA-02	January 3, 1975	2nd term	Left the House in 1979.
283	Don Bonker	D	WA-03	January 3, 1975	2nd term	
284	William M. Brodhead	D	MI-17	January 3, 1975	2nd term	
285	Bob Carr	D	MI-06	January 3, 1975	2nd term	
286	Robert John Cornell	D	WI-08	January 3, 1975	2nd term	Left the House in 1979.
287	Butler Derrick	D	SC-03	January 3, 1975	2nd term	
288	Chris Dodd	D	CT-02	January 3, 1975	2nd term	
289	Thomas Downey	D	NY-02	January 3, 1975	2nd term	
290	Robert B. Duncan	D	OR-04	January 3, 1975; Previous service, 1963–1967.	4th term*	
291	Norman D'Amours	D	NH-01	January 3, 1975	2nd term	
292	Joseph D. Early	D	MA-03	January 3, 1975	2nd term	
293	Robert W. Edgar	D	PA-07	January 3, 1975	2nd term	
294	David F. Emery	R	ME-01	January 3, 1975	2nd term	
295	Glenn English	D	OK-06	January 3, 1975	2nd term	
296	David W. Evans	D	IN-06	January 3, 1975	2nd term	
297	Millicent Fenwick	R	NJ-05	January 3, 1975	2nd term	
298	Joseph L. Fisher	D	VA-10	January 3, 1975	2nd term	
299	Floyd Fithian	D	IN-02	January 3, 1975	2nd term	
300	James Florio	D	NJ-01	January 3, 1975	2nd term	
301	Harold Ford	D	TN-08	January 3, 1975	2nd term	
302	Bill Goodling	R	PA-19	January 3, 1975	2nd term	
303	Bill Gradison	R	OH-01	January 3, 1975	2nd term	
304	Chuck Grassley	R	IA-03	January 3, 1975	2nd term	
305	Tom Hagedorn	R	MN-02	January 3, 1975	2nd term	
306	Mark W. Hannaford	D	CA-34	January 3, 1975	2nd term	Left the House in 1979.
307	George V. Hansen	R	ID-02	January 3, 1975; Previous service, 1965–1969.	4th term*	
308	Tom Harkin	D	IA-05	January 3, 1975	2nd term	
309	Herbert Harris	D	VA-08	January 3, 1975	2nd term	
310	Bill Hefner	D	NC-08	January 3, 1975	2nd term	
311	Jack English Hightower	D	TX-13	January 3, 1975	2nd term	
312	Kenneth Lamar Holland	D	SC-05	January 3, 1975	2nd term	
313	Carroll Hubbard	D	KY-01	January 3, 1975	2nd term	
314	William Hughes	D	NJ-02	January 3, 1975	2nd term	
315	Henry Hyde	R	IL-06	January 3, 1975	2nd term	
316	Andrew Jacobs Jr.	D	IN-11	January 3, 1975; Previous service, 1965–1973.	6th term*	
317	Jim Jeffords	R	VT	January 3, 1975	2nd term	
318	John Jenrette	D	SC-06	January 3, 1975	2nd term	
319	Bob Kasten	R	WI-09	January 3, 1975	2nd term	Left the House in 1979.
320	Richard Kelly	R	FL-05	January 3, 1975	2nd term	
321	Martha Elizabeth Keys	D	KS-02	January 3, 1975	2nd term	Left the House in 1979.
322	Tom Kindness	R	OH-08	January 3, 1975	2nd term	
323	John Hans Krebs	D	CA-17	January 3, 1975	2nd term	Left the House in 1979.
324	Bob Krueger	D	TX-21	January 3, 1975	2nd term	Left the House in 1979.
325	John LaFalce	D	NY-36	January 3, 1975	2nd term	
326	Elliott H. Levitas	D	GA-04	January 3, 1975	2nd term	
327	James F. Lloyd	D	CA-35	January 3, 1975	2nd term	
328	Marilyn Lloyd	D	TN-03	January 3, 1975	2nd term	
329	Andrew Maguire	D	NJ-07	January 3, 1975	2nd term	
330	Helen Stevenson Meyner	D	NJ-13	January 3, 1975	2nd term	Left the House in 1979.
331	Larry McDonald	D	GA-07	January 3, 1975	2nd term	
332	Matthew F. McHugh	D	NY-27	January 3, 1975	2nd term	
333	Abner J. Mikva	D	IL-10	January 3, 1975; Previous service, 1969–1973.	4th term*	
334	George Miller	D	CA-07	January 3, 1975	2nd term	
335	Norman Mineta	D	CA-13	January 3, 1975	2nd term	
336	Toby Moffett	D	CT-06	January 3, 1975	2nd term	
337	Henson Moore	R	LA-06	January 3, 1975	2nd term	
338	Ronald M. Mottl	D	OH-23	January 3, 1975	2nd term	
339	Gary A. Myers	R	PA-25	January 3, 1975	2nd term	Left the House in 1979.
340	Stephen Neal	D	NC-05	January 3, 1975	2nd term	
341	Rick Nolan	D	MN-06	January 3, 1975	2nd term	
342	Henry J. Nowak	D	NY-37	January 3, 1975	2nd term	
343	Jim Oberstar	D	MN-08	January 3, 1975	2nd term	
344	Richard Ottinger	D	NY-24	January 3, 1975; Previous service, 1965–1971.	5th term*	
345	Jerry M. Patterson	D	CA-38	January 3, 1975	2nd term	
346	Edward W. Pattison	D	NY-29	January 3, 1975	2nd term	Left the House in 1979.
347	Larry Pressler	R	SD-01	January 3, 1975	2nd term	Left the House in 1979.
348	Fred Richmond	D	NY-14	January 3, 1975	2nd term	
349	Ted Risenhoover	D	OK-02	January 3, 1975	2nd term	Left the House in 1979.
350	Marty Russo	D	IL-03	January 3, 1975	2nd term	
351	James David Santini	D	NV	January 3, 1975	2nd term	
352	James H. Scheuer	D	NY-11	January 3, 1975; Previous service, 1965–1973.	6th term*	
353	Richard T. Schulze	R	PA-05	January 3, 1975	2nd term	
354	Philip Sharp	D	IN-10	January 3, 1975	2nd term	
355	Paul Simon	D	IL-24	January 3, 1975	2nd term	
356	Virginia D. Smith	R	NE-03	January 3, 1975	2nd term	
357	Gladys Spellman	D	MD-05	January 3, 1975	2nd term	
358	Stephen J. Solarz	D	NY-13	January 3, 1975	2nd term	
359	Paul Tsongas	D	MA-05	January 3, 1975	2nd term	Left the House in 1979.
360	Henry Waxman	D	CA-24	January 3, 1975	2nd term	
361	Jim Weaver	D	OR-03	January 3, 1975	2nd term	
362	Tim Wirth	D	CO-02	January 3, 1975	2nd term	
363	Leo C. Zeferetti	D	NY-15	January 3, 1975	2nd term	
364	Shirley Neil Pettis	R	CA-37	April 29, 1975	2nd term	Left the House in 1979.
365	John G. Fary	D	IL-05	July 8, 1975	2nd term	
366	Clifford Allen	D	TN-05	November 25, 1975	2nd term	Died on June 18, 1978.
367	Stan Lundine	D	NY-39	March 2, 1976	2nd term	
368	Sam B. Hall Jr.	D	TX-01	June 19, 1976	2nd term	
369	Earl Thomas Coleman	R	MO-06	November 2, 1976	2nd term	
370	Ed Markey	D	MA-07	November 2, 1976	2nd term	
371	Michael Myers	D	PA-01	November 2, 1976	2nd term	
372	Daniel Akaka	D	HI-02	January 3, 1977	1st term	
373	Joseph S. Ammerman	D	PA-23	January 3, 1977	1st term	Left the House in 1979.
374	Douglas Applegate	D	OH-18	January 3, 1977	1st term	
375	Robert Badham	R	CA-40	January 3, 1977	1st term	
376	Doug Barnard Jr.	D	GA-10	January 3, 1977	1st term	
377	Anthony C. Beilenson	D	CA-23	January 3, 1977	1st term	
378	Adam Benjamin Jr.	D	IN-01	January 3, 1977	1st term	
379	David Bonior	D	MI-12	January 3, 1977	1st term	
380	Bruce F. Caputo	R	NY-23	January 3, 1977	1st term	Left the House in 1979.
381	John Joseph Cavanaugh III	D	NE-02	January 3, 1977	1st term	
382	Tom Corcoran	R	IL-15	January 3, 1977	1st term	
383	David L. Cornwell	D	IN-08	January 3, 1977	1st term	Left the House in 1979.
384	Norm Dicks	D	WA-06	January 3, 1977	1st term	
385	Bob Dornan	R	CA-27	January 3, 1977	1st term	
386	Mickey Edwards	R	OK-05	January 3, 1977	1st term	
387	Allen E. Ertel	D	PA-17	January 3, 1977	1st term	
388	Billy Lee Evans	D	GA-08	January 3, 1977	1st term	
389	Thomas B. Evans Jr.	R	DE	January 3, 1977	1st term	
390	Ronnie Flippo	D	AL-05	January 3, 1977	1st term	
391	Robert Gammage	D	TX-22	January 3, 1977	1st term	Left the House in 1979.
392	Dick Gephardt	D	MO-03	January 3, 1977	1st term	
393	Dan Glickman	D	KS-04	January 3, 1977	1st term	
394	Al Gore	D	TN-04	January 3, 1977	1st term	
395	V. Lamar Gudger	D	NC-11	January 3, 1977	1st term	
396	Cecil Heftel	D	HI-01	January 3, 1977	1st term	
397	Harold C. Hollenbeck	R	NJ-09	January 3, 1977	1st term	
398	Jerry Huckaby	D	LA-05	January 3, 1977	1st term	
399	Andy Ireland	D	FL-08	January 3, 1977	1st term	
400	Ed Jenkins	D	GA-09	January 3, 1977	1st term	
401	Dale Kildee	D	MI-07	January 3, 1977	1st term	
402	Peter H. Kostmayer	D	PA-08	January 3, 1977	1st term	
403	Jim Leach	R	IA-01	January 3, 1977	1st term	
404	Raymond F. Lederer	D	PA-03	January 3, 1977	1st term	
405	Joseph A. LeFante	D	NJ-14	January 3, 1977	1st term	Resigned on December 14, 1978.
406	Tom Luken	D	OH-02	January 3, 1977; Previous service, 1974–1975.	2nd term*	
407	Marc L. Marks	R	PA-24	January 3, 1977	1st term	
408	Ron Marlenee	R	MT-02	January 3, 1977	1st term	
409	David D. Marriott	R	UT-02	January 3, 1977	1st term	
410	Jim Mattox	D	TX-05	January 3, 1977	1st term	
411	Barbara Mikulski	D	MD-03	January 3, 1977	1st term	
412	Austin Murphy	D	PA-22	January 3, 1977	1st term	
413	Mary Rose Oakar	D	OH-20	January 3, 1977	1st term	
414	Leon Panetta	D	CA-16	January 3, 1977	1st term	
415	Donald J. Pease	D	OH-13	January 3, 1977	1st term	
416	Carl Pursell	R	MI-02	January 3, 1977	1st term	
417	Dan Quayle	R	IN-04	January 3, 1977	1st term	
418	Nick Rahall	D	WV-04	January 3, 1977	1st term	
419	Eldon Rudd	R	AZ-04	January 3, 1977	1st term	
420	Harold S. Sawyer	R	MI-05	January 3, 1977	1st term	
421	Ike Skelton	D	MO-04	January 3, 1977	1st term	
422	Newton Steers	R	MD-08	January 3, 1977	1st term	Left the House in 1979.
423	David Stockman	R	MI-04	January 3, 1977	1st term	
424	Bob Stump	D	AZ-03	January 3, 1977	1st term	
425	Richard Alvin Tonry	D	LA-01	January 3, 1977	1st term	Resigned on May 4, 1977.
426	Jim Guy Tucker	D	AR-02	January 3, 1977	1st term	Left the House in 1979.
427	Paul S. Trible Jr.	R	VA-01	January 3, 1977	1st term	
428	Bruce Vento	D	MN-04	January 3, 1977	1st term	
429	Harold Volkmer	D	MO-09	January 3, 1977	1st term	
430	Doug Walgren	D	PA-18	January 3, 1977	1st term	
431	Robert Walker	R	PA-16	January 3, 1977	1st term	
432	Wes Watkins	D	OK-03	January 3, 1977	1st term	
433	Charles Whitley	D	NC-03	January 3, 1977	1st term	
434	Theodore S. Weiss	D	NY-20	January 3, 1977	1st term	
435	Robert A. Young	D	MO-02	January 3, 1977	1st term	
	Arlan Stangeland	R	MN-07	February 22, 1977	1st term	
	Wyche Fowler	D	GA-05	April 6, 1977	1st term	
	John E. Cunningham	R	WA-07	May 17, 1977	1st term	Left the House in 1979.
	Bob Livingston	R	LA-01	August 27, 1977	1st term	
	S. William Green	R	NY-18	February 14, 1978	1st term	
	Robert Garcia	D	NY-21	February 21, 1978	1st term	

== Delegates ==
Rank	Delegate	Party	District	Seniority date (Previous service, if any)	No.# of term(s)	Notes
1	Walter E. Fauntroy	D	DC	March 23, 1971	4th term	
2	Ron de Lugo	D	VI	January 3, 1973	3rd term	
3	Antonio Borja Won Pat	D	GU	January 3, 1973	3rd term	
4	Baltasar Corrada del Río	D	PR	January 3, 1977	1st term	

== See also ==
- 95th United States Congress
- List of United States congressional districts
- List of United States senators in the 95th Congress
