= Joe F. Ragland =

American politician (1936–2025)

Member of the Georgia House of Representatives from the post 3, 109th district
- In office 1967–1969
- Preceded by: John F. Stewart
- Succeeded by: Billy Lee Evans (in 81st district, post 3)

Personal details
- Born: April 7, 1936 Newnan, Georgia, U.S.
- Died: January 24, 2025 (aged 88)
- Party: Democratic (to 1968); Republican (from 1968)

Joe F. Ragland (April 7, 1936 – January 24, 2025) was an American politician from the state of Georgia. He served as a Democratic-turned-Republican member of the Georgia House of Representatives from 1967 to 1969. He was born in Newnan, Georgia, grew up in Macon, and earned a bachelor's degree in business administration from the University of Georgia. He began a career in realty before being elected to the Georgia House of Representatives as a Democrat in 1966. On March 1, 1968, he switched to the Republican Party, citing what he saw as the benefits of a strong two-party system and the alignment of local youths with his new party. Later that year, he lost the Republican primary for re-election to future U.S. congressman Billy Lee Evans.

== Electoral history ==
=== 1966 ===
==== General election ====
Georgia House of Representatives, District 109, Post 3, 1966 general election * denotes incumbent Source:
Party	Candidate	Votes	%
Democratic	Joe F. Ragland	16,198	52.6
Republican	Thomas W. Alexander	14,568	47.4
Total votes		30,766	100

=== 1968 ===
==== Primary election ====
Georgia House of Representatives, District 81, Post 3, 1966 primary election * denotes incumbent Source:
Party	Candidate	Votes	%
Republican	Billy Lee Evans	1,101	65.6
Republican	Joe F. Ragland *	578	34.4
Total votes		1,679	100
