= J. Roy Rowland =

American politician (1926–2022)

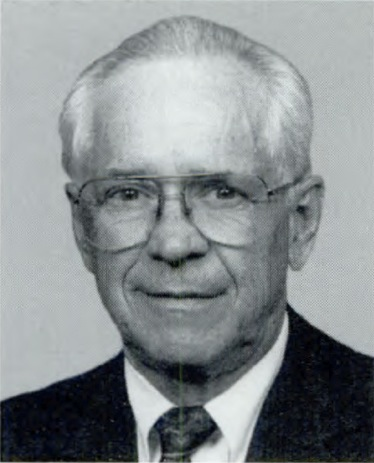

Member of the U.S. House of Representatives from Georgia's 8th district
- In office January 3, 1983 – January 3, 1995
- Preceded by: Billy Lee Evans
- Succeeded by: Saxby Chambliss

Member of the Georgia House of Representatives from the 119th district
- In office 1976–1982
- Preceded by: William Washington Larsen, Jr.
- Succeeded by: DuBose Porter

Personal details
- Born: James Roy Rowland Jr. February 3, 1926 Wrightsville, Georgia, U.S.
- Died: April 25, 2022 (aged 96) Dublin, Georgia, U.S.
- Party: Democratic
- Education: South Georgia College; University of Georgia; Medical College of Georgia

James Roy Rowland Jr. (February 3, 1926 – April 25, 2022) was an American World War II veteran, politician, and physician from the U.S. state of Georgia who served as a member of the Georgia House of Representatives from the 119th district from 1976 to 1982 and as a member of the United States House of Representatives for six terms representing Georgia's 8th congressional district from 1983 to 1995.

== Early life and education ==
Rowland attended Wrightsville High School and graduated in 1943. He then attended Emory University at Oxford, Georgia in 1943, South Georgia College in Douglas, Georgia, in 1946 and the University of Georgia in Athens from 1946 to 1948. Rowland earned his Doctor of Medicine from the Medical College of Georgia in Augusta, Georgia in 1952. His education was obtained around his service in the United States Army during World War II as a sergeant from 1944 to 1946. He was a practicing physician from 1952 to 1982.

== Political tenure ==
Rowland served as a member of the Georgia House of Representatives from 1976 through 1982.

=== Congress ===
He was first elected to the United States House of Representatives in 1982 when he defeated fellow Democrat Billy Lee Evans, who had been tainted by a scandal of accusations of accepting illegal campaign contributions. Rowland served six terms in Congress, from January 3, 1983, to January 3, 1995, and did not seek re-nomination in 1994.

While in Congress, he introduced the Radiation-Exposed Veterans Compensation Act of 1988 and the Veterans Health Programs Extension Act of 1994, both of which were signed into law.

== Death and legacy ==
The J. Roy Rowland Federal Courthouse in Dublin, Georgia, built in 1935, was renamed for him.

Rowland died on April 25, 2022, at the age of 96. He was interred in Westview Cemetery in Wrightsville, Georgia.

U.S. House of Representatives
Preceded by Billy Lee Evans	Member of the U.S. House of Representatives from Georgia's 8th congressional district January 3, 1983 – January 3, 1995	Succeeded by Saxby Chambliss
