= 1976 United States Senate election in Tennessee =

- November 2, 1976
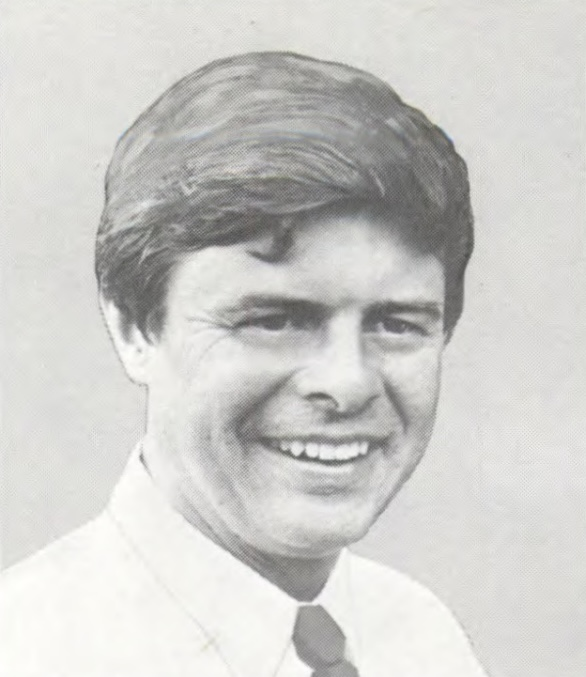

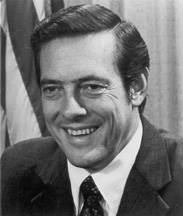
Nominee	Jim Sasser	Bill Brock
Party	Democratic	Republican
Popular vote	751,180	673,231
Percentage	52.46%	47.01%
- County results Sasser: 50–60% 60–70% 70–80% 80–90% Brock: 50–60% 60–70% 70–80%
U.S. senator before election
Bill Brock
Republican
Elected U.S. Senator
Jim Sasser
Democratic

The 1976 United States Senate election in Tennessee took place on November 2, 1976. Incumbent Republican U.S. Senator Bill Brock ran for re-election to a second term, but was defeated by Democratic challenger Jim Sasser.

Several prominent Democrats ran in the Democratic primary. The most prominent was probably 1970 gubernatorial nominee John Jay Hooker; somewhat surprisingly to most observers, however, the winner of the primary was Jim Sasser, who had managed Albert Gore Sr.'s 1970 re-election campaign.

Prior to his Senate re-election run, Brock was among those considered to replace Nelson Rockefeller as President Gerald Ford's running mate in the 1976 election.

== Primary ==
18.1% of the voting age population participated in the Democratic primary.

== Major candidates ==
=== Republican ===
- Bill Brock, incumbent U.S. senator since 1971

=== Democratic ===
- John Jay Hooker, attorney and candidate for governor in 1966 and nominee in 1970
- Jim Sasser, attorney and Democratic activist

== Results ==
General election results
Party	Candidate	Votes	%	±%
Democratic	James Sasser	751,180	52.46	
Republican	Bill Brock (incumbent)	673,231	47.01	
Independent	Mark Clark Bates	5,137	0.36	
Independent	Willie C. Jacox	1,406	0.10	
Independent	Arnold Joseph Zandie	1,061	0.07	
None	Write-ins	31	0.00	
Majority		77,949	5.45	
Turnout		1,432,046		
Democratic gain from Republican		Swing		

== See also ==
- 1976 United States Senate elections
- 1976 United States presidential election in Tennessee

== Works cited ==
- Steed, Robert; Moreland, Laurence; Baker, Tod, eds. (1980). Party Politics in the South. Praeger Publishers. ISBN 0030565863.
