= List of United States senators in the 95th Congress =

This is a complete list of United States senators during the 95th United States Congress listed by seniority from January 3, 1977, to January 3, 1979.

Order of service is based on the commencement of the senator's first term. Behind this is former service as a senator (only giving the senator seniority within their new incoming class), service as vice president, a House member, a cabinet secretary, or a governor of a state. The final factor is the population of the senator's state.

In this congress, John C. Stennis was the most senior junior senator until James Eastland resigned on December 27, 1978, after which it was Henry M. Jackson. Four senators held the distinction of most junior senior senator during this Congress: John Glenn from the start of the congress until John L. McClellan's death on November 28, 1977, Dale Bumpers from then until Lee Metcalf's death on January 12, 1978, John Melcher from then until Wendell Anderson's resignation on December 29, 1978, and finally David Durenberger through the end of the Congress.

Senators who were sworn in during the middle of the two-year congressional term (up until the last senator who was not sworn in early after winning the November 1978 election) are listed at the end of the list with no number.

== Terms of service ==
Class	Terms of service of senators that expired in years
Class 2	Terms of service of senators that expired in 1979 (AK, AL, AR, CO, DE, GA, IA, ID, IL, KS, KY, LA, MA, ME, MI, MN, MS, MT, NC, NE, NH, NJ, NM, OK, OR, RI, SC, SD, TN, TX, VA, WV, and WY.)
Class 3	Terms of service of senators that expired in 1981 (AK, AL, AR, AZ, CA, CO, CT, FL, GA, HI, IA, ID, IL, IN, KS, KY, LA, MD, MO, NC, ND, NH, NV, NY, OH, OK, OR, PA, SC, SD, UT, VT, WA, and WI.)
Class 1	Terms of service of senators that expired in 1983 (AZ, CA, CT, DE, FL, HI, IN, ME, MD, MA, MI, MN, MO, MS, MT, ND, NE, NJ, NM, NV, NY, OH, PA, RI, TN, TX, UT, VA, VT, WA, WV, WI, and WY.)

== U.S. Senate seniority list ==
U.S. Senate seniority
Rank	Senator (party-state)	Seniority date	Other factors
1	James Eastland (D-MS)	January 3, 1943	Previously a senator
2	John Little McClellan (D-AR)	January 3, 1943	
3	Warren G. Magnuson (D-WA)	December 14, 1944	
4	Milton Young (R-ND)	March 12, 1945	
5	John Sparkman (D-AL)	November 6, 1946	
6	John C. Stennis (D-MS)	November 17, 1947	
7	Russell B. Long (D-LA)	December 31, 1948	
8	Henry M. Jackson (D-WA)	January 3, 1953	
9	Carl Curtis (R-NE)	January 1, 1955	
10	Clifford P. Case (R-NJ)	January 3, 1955	
11	Strom Thurmond (R-SC)	November 7, 1956	
12	Herman Talmadge (D-GA)	January 3, 1957	Former governor
13	Frank Church (D-ID)	January 3, 1957	
14	Jacob K. Javits (R-NY)	January 9, 1957	
15	William Proxmire (D-WI)	August 28, 1957	
16	Jennings Randolph (D-WV)	November 5, 1958	
17	Robert Byrd (D-WV)	January 3, 1959	Former representative (6 years)
18	Harrison A. Williams (D-NJ)	January 3, 1959	Former representative (4 years)
19	Edmund Muskie (D-ME)	January 3, 1959	Former governor
20	Howard Cannon (D-NV)	January 3, 1959	
21	Quentin Northrup Burdick (D-ND)	August 8, 1960	
22	Lee Metcalf (D-MT)	January 3, 1961	Former representative
23	Claiborne Pell (D-RI)	January 3, 1961	
24	John Tower (R-TX)	June 15, 1961	
25	James B. Pearson (R-KS)	January 31, 1962	
26	Ted Kennedy (D-MA)	November 7, 1962	Massachusetts 9th in population (1960)
27	Thomas J. McIntyre (D-NH)	November 7, 1962	New Hampshire 45th in population (1960)
28	Abraham A. Ribicoff (D-CT)	January 3, 1963	Former representative (4 years) - Former cabinet secretary
29	George McGovern (D-SD)	January 3, 1963	Former representative (4 years) - South Dakota 40th in population (1960)
30	Daniel Inouye (D-HI)	January 3, 1963	Former representative (4 years) - Hawaii 43rd in population (1960)
31	Birch Bayh (D-IN)	January 3, 1963	
32	Gaylord Nelson (D-WI)	January 7, 1963	
33	Harry F. Byrd, Jr. (I-VA)	November 12, 1965	
34	Robert P. Griffin (R-MI)	May 11, 1966	
35	Ernest Hollings (D-SC)	November 9, 1966	
36	Clifford Hansen (R-WY)	January 3, 1967	Former governor
37	Charles H. Percy (R-IL)	January 3, 1967	Illinois 4th in population (1960)
38	Edward Brooke (R-MA)	January 3, 1967	Massachusetts 9th in population (1960)
39	Howard Baker (R-TN)	January 3, 1967	Tennessee 17th in population (1960)
40	Mark Hatfield (R-OR)	January 10, 1967	
41	Ted Stevens (R-AK)	December 24, 1968	
42	Thomas Eagleton (D-MO)	December 28, 1968	
43	Barry Goldwater (R-AZ)	January 3, 1969	Previously a senator
44	Richard Schweiker (R-PA)	January 3, 1969	Former representative (8 years) - Pennsylvania 3rd in population (1960)
45	Charles Mathias (R-MD)	January 3, 1969	Former representative (8 years) - Maryland 21st in population (1960)
46	Bob Dole (R-KS)	January 3, 1969	Former representative (8 years) - Kansas 29th in population (1960)
47	Henry Bellmon (R-OK)	January 3, 1969	Former governor
48	Alan Cranston (D-CA)	January 3, 1969	California 2nd in population (1960)
49	James Allen (D-AL)	January 3, 1969	Alabama 19th in population (1960)
50	Bob Packwood (R-OR)	January 3, 1969	Oregon 32nd in population (1960)
51	Mike Gravel (D-AK)	January 3, 1969	Alaska 50th in population (1960)
52	Adlai Stevenson III (D-IL)	November 17, 1970	
53	Bill Roth (R-DE)	January 1, 1971	
54	Hubert Humphrey (D-MN)	January 3, 1971	Previously a senator
55	Lloyd Bentsen (D-TX)	January 3, 1971	Former representative (6 years)
56	Lowell Weicker (R-CT)	January 3, 1971	Former representative (2 years)
57	Lawton Chiles (D-FL)	January 3, 1971	
58	Robert Stafford (R-VT)	September 16, 1971	
59	Sam Nunn (D-GA)	November 8, 1972	
60	Bennett Johnston Jr. (D-LA)	November 14, 1972	
61	William Hathaway (D-ME)	January 3, 1973	Former representative (8 years)
62	William L. Scott (R-VA)	January 3, 1973	Former representative (6 years)
63	James A. McClure (R-ID)	January 3, 1973	Former representative (4 years)
64	James Abourezk (D-SD)	January 3, 1973	Former representative (2 years)
65	Dewey F. Bartlett (R-OK)	January 3, 1973	Former governor
66	Jesse Helms (R-NC)	January 3, 1973	North Carolina 12th in population (1970)
67	Walter Huddleston (D-KY)	January 3, 1973	Kentucky 23rd in population (1970)
68	Richard C. Clark (D-IA)	January 3, 1973	Iowa 25th in population (1970)
69	Floyd K. Haskell (D-CO)	January 3, 1973	Colorado 30th in population (1970)
70	Pete Domenici (R-NM)	January 3, 1973	New Mexico 37th in population (1970)
71	Joe Biden (D-DE)	January 3, 1973	Delaware 46th in population (1970)
72	Paul Laxalt (R-NV)	December 18, 1974	
73	Jake Garn (R-UT)	December 21, 1974	
74	John Glenn (D-OH)	December 24, 1974	
75	Wendell H. Ford (D-KY)	December 28, 1974	
76	Richard Stone (D-FL)	January 1, 1975	
77	John Culver (D-IA)	January 3, 1975	Former representative
78	Dale Bumpers (D-AR)	January 3, 1975	Former governor
79	Robert Burren Morgan (D-NC)	January 3, 1975	North Carolina 12th in population (1970)
80	Gary Hart (D-CO)	January 3, 1975	Colorado 30th in population (1970)
81	Patrick Leahy (D-VT)	January 3, 1975	Vermont 48th in population (1970)
82	John Durkin (D-NH)	September 18, 1975	
83	John Danforth (R-MO)	December 27, 1976	
84	Edward Zorinsky (D-NE)	December 28, 1976	
85	Howard Metzenbaum (D-OH)	December 29, 1976	Previously a senator
86	John Chafee (R-RI)	December 29, 1976	
87	Donald W. Riegle, Jr. (D-MI)	December 30, 1976	Former representative
88	Wendell Anderson (D-MN)	December 30, 1976	
89	Samuel Hayakawa (D-CA)	January 2, 1977	
90	Spark Matsunaga (D-HI)	January 3, 1977	Former representative (14 years)
91	John Melcher (D-MT)	January 3, 1977	Former representative (7 years, 7 months)
92	H. John Heinz III (R-PA)	January 3, 1977	Former representative (6 years)
93	Paul Sarbanes (D-MD)	January 3, 1977	Former representative (6 years)
94	Pat Moynihan (D-NY)	January 3, 1977	New York 2nd in population (1970)
95	Richard Lugar (R-IN)	January 3, 1977	Indiana 11th in population (1970)
96	Jim Sasser (D-TN)	January 3, 1977	Tennessee 17th in population (1970)
97	Dennis DeConcini (D-AZ)	January 3, 1977	Arizona 33rd in population (1970)
98	Orrin Hatch (R-UT)	January 3, 1977	Utah 36th in population (1970)
99	Harrison Schmitt (R-NM)	January 3, 1977	New Mexico 37th in population (1970)
100	Malcolm Wallop (R-WY)	January 3, 1977	Wyoming 29th in population (1970)
	Kaneaster Hodges (D-AR)	December 10, 1977	
	Paul G. Hatfield (D-MT)	January 22, 1978	
	Muriel Humphrey (D-MN)	January 25, 1978	
	Maryon Allen (D-AL)	June 12, 1978	
	David Durenberger (R-MN)	November 8, 1978	Minnesota 19th in population (1970)
	Donald W. Stewart (D-AL)	November 8, 1978	Alabama 21st in population (1970)
	Max Baucus (D-MT)	December 15, 1978	
	Nancy Kassebaum Baker (R-KS)	December 23, 1978	
	Thad Cochran (R-MS)	December 27, 1978	
	Rudy Boschwitz (R-MN)	December 30, 1978	
	Alan K. Simpson (R-WY)	January 1, 1979	
	John Warner (R-VA)	January 2, 1979	

The most senior senators by class were John C. Stennis (D-Mississippi) from Class 1, James Eastland (D-Mississippi) from Class 2, and Warren G. Magnuson (D-Washington) from Class 3. Stennis was the most senior senator from his class while being the junior senator from his state. Eastland resigned on December 27, 1978 with John Sparkman (D-Alabama) became the senior senator from his class on the final days of Congress.

== See also ==
- 95th United States Congress
- List of United States representatives in the 95th Congress
