= List of United States senators in the 96th Congress =

This is a complete list of United States senators during the 96th United States Congress listed by seniority from January 3, 1979, to January 3, 1981.

Order of service is based on the commencement of the senator's first term. Behind this is former service as a senator (only giving the senator seniority within their new incoming class), service as vice president, a House member, a cabinet secretary, or a governor of a state. The final factor is the population of the senator's state.

In this congress, Henry M. Jackson was the most senior junior senator and Donald W. Stewart was the most junior senior senator until May 7, 1980 when Edmund Muskie resigned to become Secretary of State. William Cohen was the most junior senior senator from that date until John Durkin resigned on December 29, 1980, after which it was Gordon Humphrey.

Senators who were sworn in during the middle of the two-year congressional term (up until the last senator who was not sworn in early after winning the November 1980 election) are listed at the end of the list with no number.

== Terms of service ==
Class	Terms of service of senators that expired in years
Class 3	Terms of service of senators that expired in 1981 (AK, AL, AR, AZ, CA, CO, CT, FL, GA, HI, IA, ID, IL, IN, KS, KY, LA, MD, MO, NC, ND, NH, NV, NY, OH, OK, OR, PA, SC, SD, UT, VT, WA, and WI.)
Class 1	Terms of service of senators that expired in 1983 (AZ, CA, CT, DE, FL, HI, IN, MA, MD, ME, MI, MN, MO, MS, MT, ND, NE, NJ, NM, NV, NY, OH, PA, RI, TN, TX, UT, VA, VT, WA, WI, WV, and WY.)
Class 2	Terms of service of senators that expired in 1985 (AK, AL, AR, CO, DE, GA, IA, ID, IL, KS, KY, LA, MA, ME, MI, MN, MS, MT, NC, NE, NH, NJ, NM, OK, OR, RI, SC, SD, TN, TX, VA, WV, and WY.)

== U.S. Senate seniority list ==
U.S. Senate seniority
Rank	Senator (party-state)	Seniority date	Other factors
1	Warren G. Magnuson (D-WA)	December 14, 1944	
2	Milton Young (R-ND)	March 12, 1945	
3	John C. Stennis (D-MS)	November 17, 1947	
4	Russell B. Long (D-LA)	December 31, 1948	
5	Henry M. Jackson (D-WA)	January 3, 1953	
6	Strom Thurmond (R-SC)	November 7, 1956	
7	Herman Talmadge (D-GA)	January 3, 1957	Former governor
8	Frank Church (D-ID)	January 3, 1957	
9	Jacob K. Javits (R-NY)	January 9, 1957	
10	William Proxmire (D-WI)	August 28, 1957	
11	Jennings Randolph (D-WV)	November 5, 1958	
12	Robert Byrd (D-WV)	January 3, 1959	Former representative (6 years)
13	Harrison A. Williams (D-NJ)	January 3, 1959	Former representative (4 years)
14	Edmund Muskie (D-ME)	January 3, 1959	Former governor
15	Howard Cannon (D-NV)	January 3, 1959	
16	Quentin Northrup Burdick (D-ND)	August 8, 1960	
17	Claiborne Pell (D-RI)	January 3, 1961	
18	John Tower (R-TX)	June 15, 1961	
19	Ted Kennedy (D-MA)	November 7, 1962	
20	Abraham A. Ribicoff (D-CT)	January 3, 1963	Former representative (4 years) - Former cabinet secretary
21	George McGovern (D-SD)	January 3, 1963	Former representative (4 years) - South Dakota 40th in population (1960)
22	Daniel Inouye (D-HI)	January 3, 1963	Former representative (4 years) - Hawaii 43rd in population (1960)
23	Birch Bayh (D-IN)	January 3, 1963	
24	Gaylord Nelson (D-WI)	January 7, 1963	
25	Harry F. Byrd, Jr. (I-VA)	November 12, 1965	
26	Ernest Hollings (D-SC)	November 9, 1966	
27	Charles H. Percy (R-IL)	January 3, 1967	Illinois 4th in population (1960)
28	Howard Baker (R-TN)	January 3, 1967	Tennessee 17th in population (1960)
29	Mark Hatfield (R-OR)	January 10, 1967	
30	Ted Stevens (R-AK)	December 24, 1968	
31	Thomas Eagleton (D-MO)	December 28, 1968	
32	Barry Goldwater (R-AZ)	January 3, 1969	Previously a senator
33	Richard Schweiker (R-PA)	January 3, 1969	Former representative (8 years) - Pennsylvania 3rd in population (1960)
34	Charles Mathias (R-MD)	January 3, 1969	Former representative (8 years) - Maryland 21st in population (1960)
35	Bob Dole (R-KS)	January 3, 1969	Former representative (8 years) - Kansas 29th in population (1960)
36	Henry Bellmon (R-OK)	January 3, 1969	Former governor
37	Alan Cranston (D-CA)	January 3, 1969	California 2nd in population (1960)
38	Bob Packwood (R-OR)	January 3, 1969	Oregon 32nd in population (1960)
39	Mike Gravel (D-AK)	January 3, 1969	Alaska 50th in population (1960)
40	Adlai Stevenson III (D-IL)	November 17, 1970	
41	Bill Roth (R-DE)	January 1, 1971	
42	Lloyd Bentsen (D-TX)	January 3, 1971	Former representative (6 years)
43	Lowell Weicker (R-CT)	January 3, 1971	Former representative (2 years)
44	Lawton Chiles (D-FL)	January 3, 1971	
45	Robert Stafford (R-VT)	September 16, 1971	
46	Sam Nunn (D-GA)	November 8, 1972	
47	Bennett Johnston Jr. (D-LA)	November 14, 1972	
48	James A. McClure (R-ID)	January 3, 1973	Former representative
49	Jesse Helms (R-NC)	January 3, 1973	North Carolina 12th in population (1970)
50	Walter Huddleston (D-KY)	January 3, 1973	Kentucky 23rd in population (1970)
51	Pete Domenici (R-NM)	January 3, 1973	New Mexico 37th in population (1970)
52	Joe Biden (D-DE)	January 3, 1973	Delaware 46th in population (1970)
53	Paul Laxalt (R-NV)	December 18, 1974	
54	Jake Garn (R-UT)	December 21, 1974	
55	John Glenn (D-OH)	December 24, 1974	
56	Wendell H. Ford (D-KY)	December 28, 1974	
57	Richard Stone (D-FL)	January 1, 1975	
58	John Culver (D-IA)	January 3, 1975	Former representative
59	Dale Bumpers (D-AR)	January 3, 1975	Former governor
60	Robert Burren Morgan (D-NC)	January 3, 1975	North Carolina 12th in population (1970)
61	Gary Hart (D-CO)	January 3, 1975	Colorado 30th in population (1970)
62	Patrick Leahy (D-VT)	January 3, 1975	Vermont 48th in population (1970)
63	John Durkin (D-NH)	September 18, 1975	
64	John Danforth (R-MO)	December 27, 1976	
65	Edward Zorinsky (D-NE)	December 28, 1976	
66	Howard Metzenbaum (D-OH)	December 29, 1976	Previously a senator
67	John Chafee (R-RI)	December 29, 1976	
68	Donald W. Riegle, Jr. (D-MI)	December 30, 1976	
69	Samuel Hayakawa (R-CA)	January 2, 1977	
70	Spark Matsunaga (D-HI)	January 3, 1977	Former representative (14 years)
71	John Melcher (D-MT)	January 3, 1977	Former representative (7 years, 7 months)
72	H. John Heinz III (R-PA)	January 3, 1977	Former representative (6 years)
73	Paul Sarbanes (D-MD)	January 3, 1977	Former representative (6 years)
74	Pat Moynihan (D-NY)	January 3, 1977	New York 2nd in population (1970)
75	Richard Lugar (R-IN)	January 3, 1977	Indiana 11th in population (1970)
76	Jim Sasser (D-TN)	January 3, 1977	Tennessee 17th in population (1970)
77	Dennis DeConcini (D-AZ)	January 3, 1977	Arizona 33rd in population (1970)
78	Orrin Hatch (R-UT)	January 3, 1977	Utah 36th in population (1970)
79	Harrison Schmitt (R-NM)	January 3, 1977	New Mexico 37th in population (1970)
80	Malcolm Wallop (R-WY)	January 3, 1977	Wyoming 29th in population (1970)
81	David Durenberger (R-MN)	November 8, 1978	Minnesota 19th in population (1970)
82	Donald W. Stewart (D-AL)	November 8, 1978	Alabama 21st in population (1970)
83	Max Baucus (D-MT)	December 15, 1978	
84	Nancy Kassebaum Baker (R-KS)	December 23, 1978	
85	Thad Cochran (R-MS)	December 27, 1978	
86	Rudy Boschwitz (R-MN)	December 30, 1978	
87	Alan K. Simpson (R-WY)	January 1, 1979	
88	John Warner (R-VA)	January 2, 1979	
89	David Pryor (D-AR)	January 3, 1979	Former representative (6 years, 2 months)
90	William Cohen (R-ME)	January 3, 1979	Former representative (6 years)
91	Paul Tsongas (D-MA)	January 3, 1979	Former representative (4 years) - Massachusetts 10th in population (1970)
92	William L. Armstrong (R-CO)	January 3, 1979	Former representative (4 years) - Colorado 30th in population (1970)
93	Larry Pressler (R-SD)	January 3, 1979	Former representative (4 years) - South Dakota 44th in population (1970)
94	David L. Boren (D-OK)	January 3, 1979	Former governor - Oklahoma 27th in population (1970)
95	J. James Exon (D-NE)	January 3, 1979	Former governor - Nebraska 35th in population (1970)
96	Carl Levin (D-MI)	January 3, 1979	Michigan 7th in population (1970)
97	Bill Bradley (D-NJ)	January 3, 1979	New Jersey 8th in population (1970)
98	Howell Heflin (D-AL)	January 3, 1979	Alabama 21st in population (1970)
99	Roger Jepsen (R-IA)	January 3, 1979	Iowa 25th in population (1970)
100	Gordon J. Humphrey (R-NH)	January 3, 1979	New Hampshire 41st in population (1970)
	George J. Mitchell (D-ME)	May 17, 1980	
	Warren Rudman (R-NH)	December 31, 1980	
	Paula Hawkins (R-FL)	January 1, 1981	
	Jeremiah Denton (R-AL)	January 2, 1981	

The most senior senators by class were John C. Stennis (D-Mississippi) from Class 1, Strom Thurmond (R-South Carolina) from Class 2, and Warren G. Magnuson (D-Washington) from Class 3.

== See also ==
- 96th United States Congress
- List of United States representatives in the 96th Congress
