= Billy Lee Evans =

American politician

Billy Evans
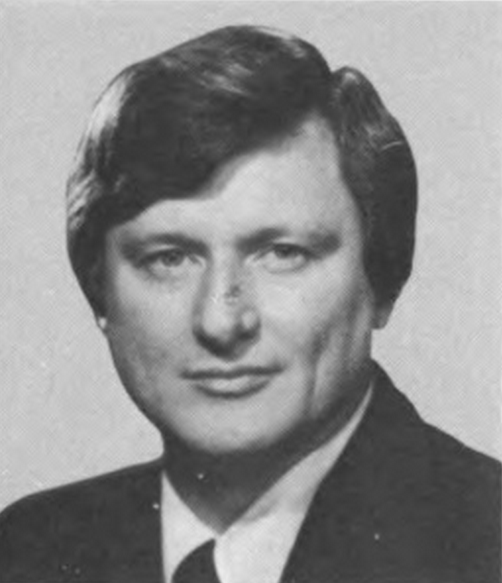

Member of the U.S. House of Representatives from Georgia's 8th district
- In office January 3, 1977 – January 3, 1983
- Preceded by: W. S. Stuckey Jr.
- Succeeded by: J. Roy Rowland

Member of the Georgia House of Representatives
- In office January 13, 1969 – January 3, 1977
- Preceded by: Joe F. Ragland
- Succeeded by: Burl Davis
- Constituency: 81st district, Post 3 (1969–1973); 89th district, Post 3 (1973–1975); 99th district (1975–1977)

Personal details
- Born: Billy Lee Evans; November 10, 1941 (age 84) Tifton, Georgia, U.S.
- Party: Republican (before 1974); Democratic (1974–present)
- Education: University of Georgia (BA, LLB)

Billy Lee Evans (born November 10, 1941) is an American politician who served in both the Georgia House of Representatives (1969–1977) and the U.S. House of Representatives (1977 to 1983).

== Early life and education ==
Evans was born in Tifton, Georgia, in 1941. He attended public schools and earned his bachelor's and law degrees from the University of Georgia.

== Career ==
Admitted to the Georgia bar in 1965, Evans began practicing law in Macon, Georgia.

Evans was a member of the Georgia House of Representatives from 1969 to 1976. He was initially elected in 1968, defeating incumbent Democrat-turned-Republican Joe F. Ragland in the Republican primary. Evans became a Democrat on June 7, 1974. On November 2, 1976, he was elected as a Democrat to the United States Congress. Evans served in Congress from January 3, 1977, to January 3, 1983. He was unsuccessful in his campaign for renomination in 1982, losing the primary to J. Roy Rowland, after accusations arose that he had accepted illegal campaign contributions.

Evans is vice president of government relations for a consulting firm in Washington, D.C., and resides in nearby Vienna, Virginia. He also serves on the Board of Directors of American Freedom Coalition, an organization founded by Christian Right leader Robert Grant and Civil Rights leader Ralph Abernathy.

U.S. House of Representatives
Preceded by W. S. Stuckey Jr.	Member of the U.S. House of Representatives from Georgia's 8th congressional district 1977–1983	Succeeded by J. Roy Rowland
U.S. order of precedence (ceremonial)
Preceded by Harold C. Hollenbeck as Former U.S. Representative	Order of precedence of the United States as Former U.S. Representative	Succeeded by Gary Franks as Former U.S. Representative
