= Topography (disambiguation) =

Topography may refer to:

== Cartography, geology and oceanography ==
- Topography, the study of the current terrain features of a region and the graphic representation of the landform on a map
  - Inverted topography, landscape features that have reversed their elevation relative to other features
  - Karst topography, a landscape on soluble rock, characterized by underground drainage systems with sinkholes and caves
  - Ocean surface topography, the difference between the surface of the ocean and the geoid
  - Shuttle Radar Topography Mission, a research effort that obtained digital elevation models on a near-global scale from 56 °S to 60 °N, to generate the most complete high-resolution digital topographic database of Earth to date
  - Topographic maps
  - Topographic prominence, a concept used in the categorization of hills and mountains, also known as peaks
  - Local history, formerly commonly called "topography"

== Culture and media ==
=== Art ===
- Topographical views
- Topography of Terror, an outdoor museum in Berlin
- New Topographics, a photography exhibit in Rochester, NY, 1975-1976

=== Literature ===
- Christian Topography, a 6th-century book written by Cosmas Indicopleustes which advances the idea that the world is flat

== Science ==
=== Medicine ===
- The location of features in the body, see human brain and topographical codes
- Corneal topography, a non-invasive medical imaging technique for mapping the surface curvature of the cornea, the outer structure of the eye

=== Ornithology ===
- The study of feather tracts, see the list of terms used in bird topography

=== Physics ===
- Diffraction topography, an X-ray imaging technique based on Bragg diffraction, in which diffraction from a crystal is recorded on film or by detector, resulting in topographic images (topographs)

== Technology ==
- The detailed design of a semiconductor integrated circuit, see integrated circuit layout design protection and the Integrated Circuit Topography Act
