= Chip art =

Microscopic artwork built into integrated circuits

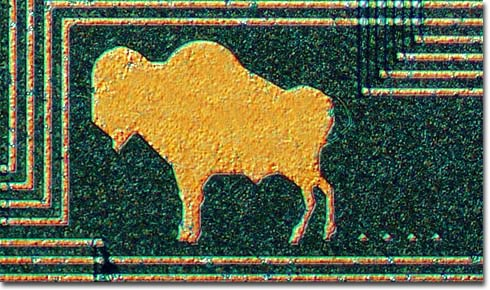
Image of a buffalo, trailing buffalo chips, etched on a digital filter chip from the HP3582a audio spectrum analyzer.

Chip art, also known as silicon art, chip graffiti or silicon doodling, refers to microscopic artwork built into integrated circuits, also called chips or ICs. Since ICs are printed by photolithography, not constructed a component at a time, there is no additional cost to include features in otherwise unused space on the chip. Designers have used this freedom to put all sorts of artwork on the chips themselves, from designers' simple initials to rather complex drawings. Given the small size of chips, these figures cannot be seen without a microscope. Chip graffiti is sometimes called the hardware version of software easter eggs.

Prior to 1984, these doodles also served a practical purpose. If a competitor produced a similar chip, and examination showed it contained the same doodles, then this was strong evidence that the design was copied (a copyright violation) and not independently derived. A 1984 revision of the US copyright law (the Semiconductor Chip Protection Act of 1984) made all chip masks automatically copyrighted, with exclusive rights to the creator, and similar rules apply in most other countries that manufacture ICs. Since an exact copy is now automatically a copyright violation, the doodles no longer serve a useful purpose in terms of hardware watermarking.

== Creating chip art ==
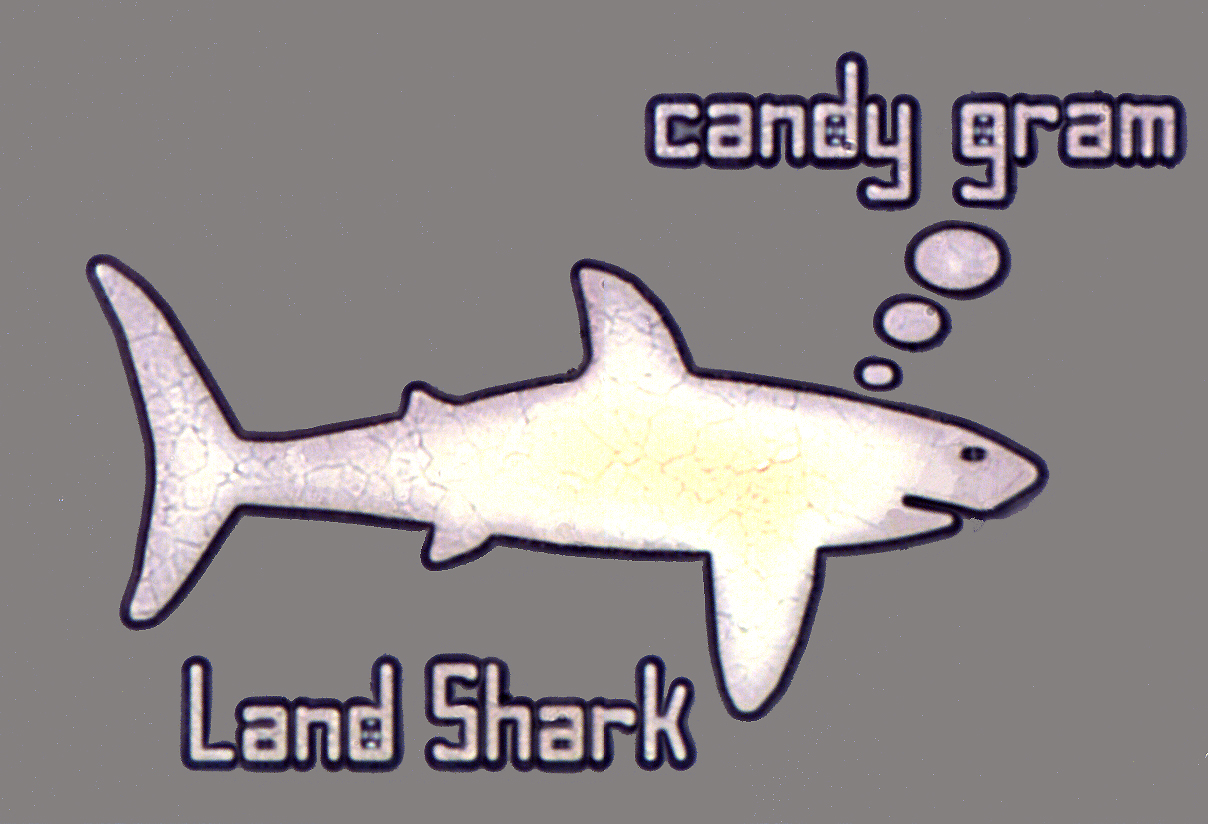
Image of a Land Shark from Saturday Night Live inside an Analog Devices AD1939 codec chip.

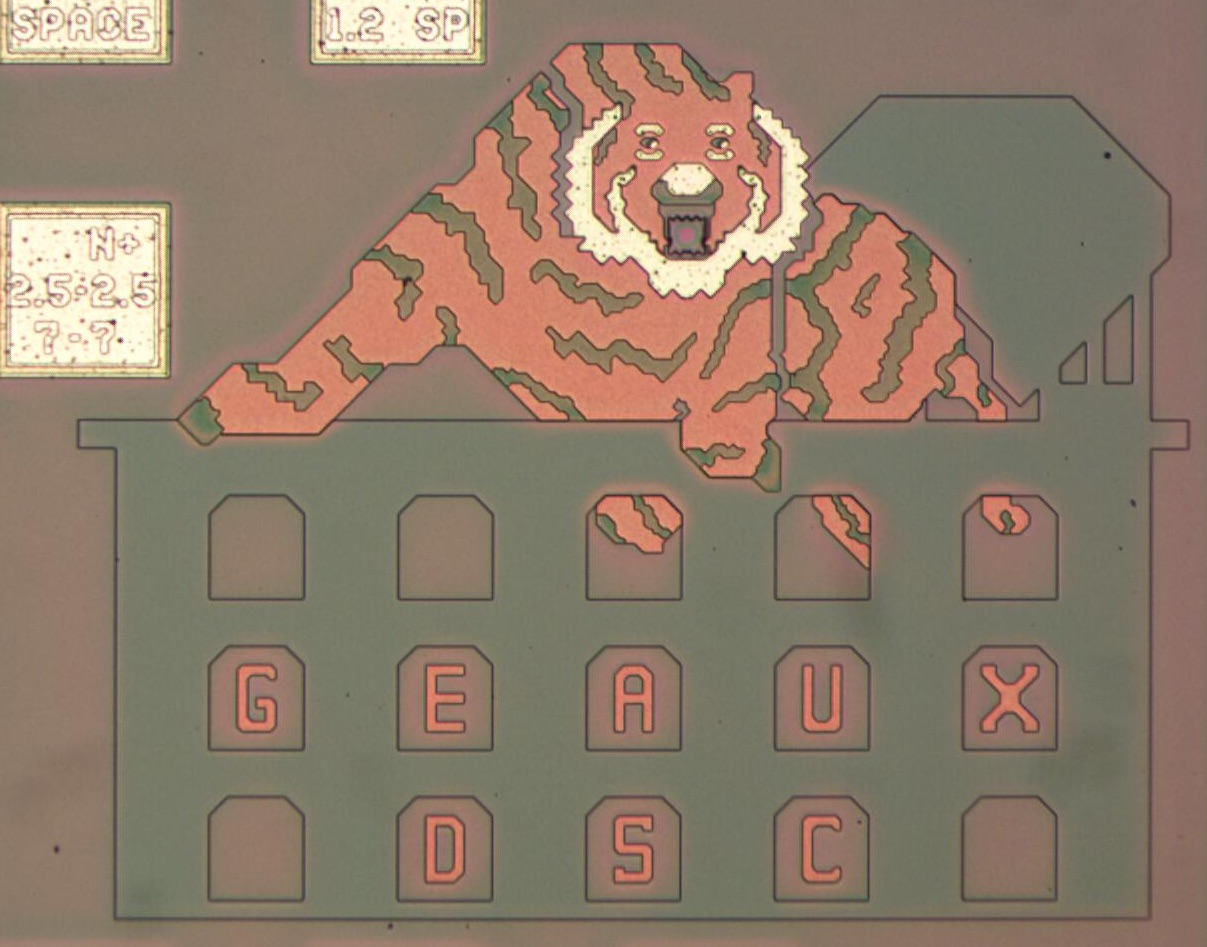
Chip art of a tiger on a Dallas Semiconductor test wafer.

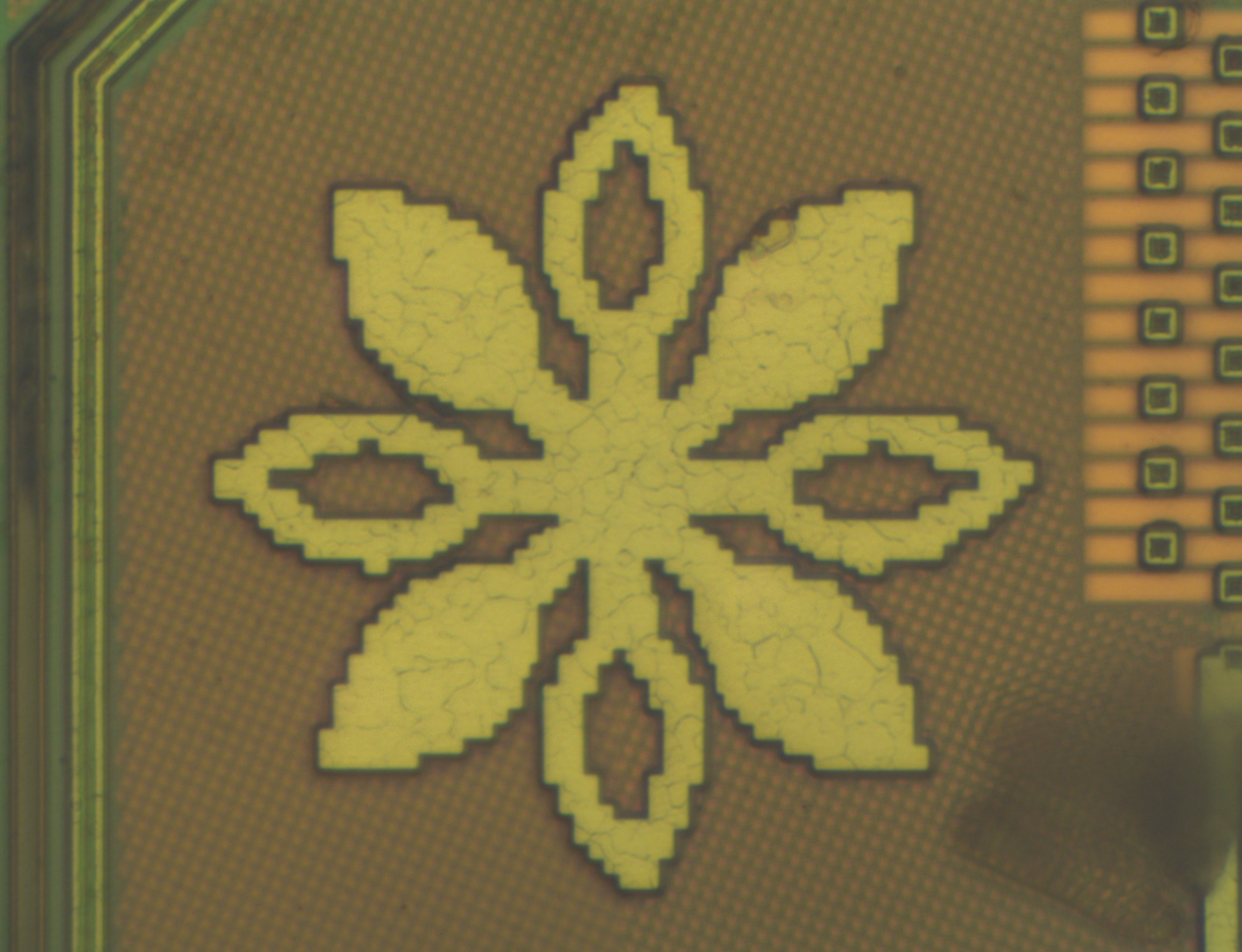
A flower in a Bitcoin mining ASIC

Integrated circuits (ICs) are constructed from multiple layers of material, typically silicon, silicon dioxide (glass), and aluminum. The composition and thickness of these layers give them their distinctive color and appearance. These elements created an irresistible palette for IC design and layout engineers.

The creative process involved in the design of these chips, a strong sense of pride in their work, and an artistic temperament combined compel people to want to mark their work as their own. It is very common to find initials, or groups of initials on chips. This is the design engineer's way of "signing" their work.

Often this creative artist's instinct extends to the inclusion of small pictures or icons. These may be images of significance to the designers, comments related to the chip's function, inside jokes, or even satirical references. Because of the difficulty in verifying their existence, chip art has also been the subject of online hoaxes (e.g. the never-seen "bill sux" comment on a Pentium chip—the reputed "photo" showing the inscription is a hoax).

The mass production of these works of art on the body of a commercial IC goes unnoticed by most observers and is discouraged by semiconductor corporations, primarily from the fear that the presence of the artwork (which is clearly unneeded) may interfere with some necessary function or design flow in the chip.

Some laboratories have started collaborating with artists or directly producing books and exhibits with the micrographs of these chips. Such is the case of Harvard chemist George Whitesides, who collaborated with photographer Felice Frankel to publish On the Surface of Things, a photography book on experiments mostly from the Whitesides lab. Also, the laboratory of Albert Folch (who, perhaps not coincidentally, works in BioMEMS, the same field as George Whitesides) at the University of Washington's Bioengineering Dept. has produced an online gallery with more than 1,700 free BioMEMS-related chip art micrographs and three art exhibits in the Seattle area.

== See also ==
- Watermarking
- Digital watermarking
