= 98th United States Congress =

1983–1985 U.S. Congress

←	97th	99th	→
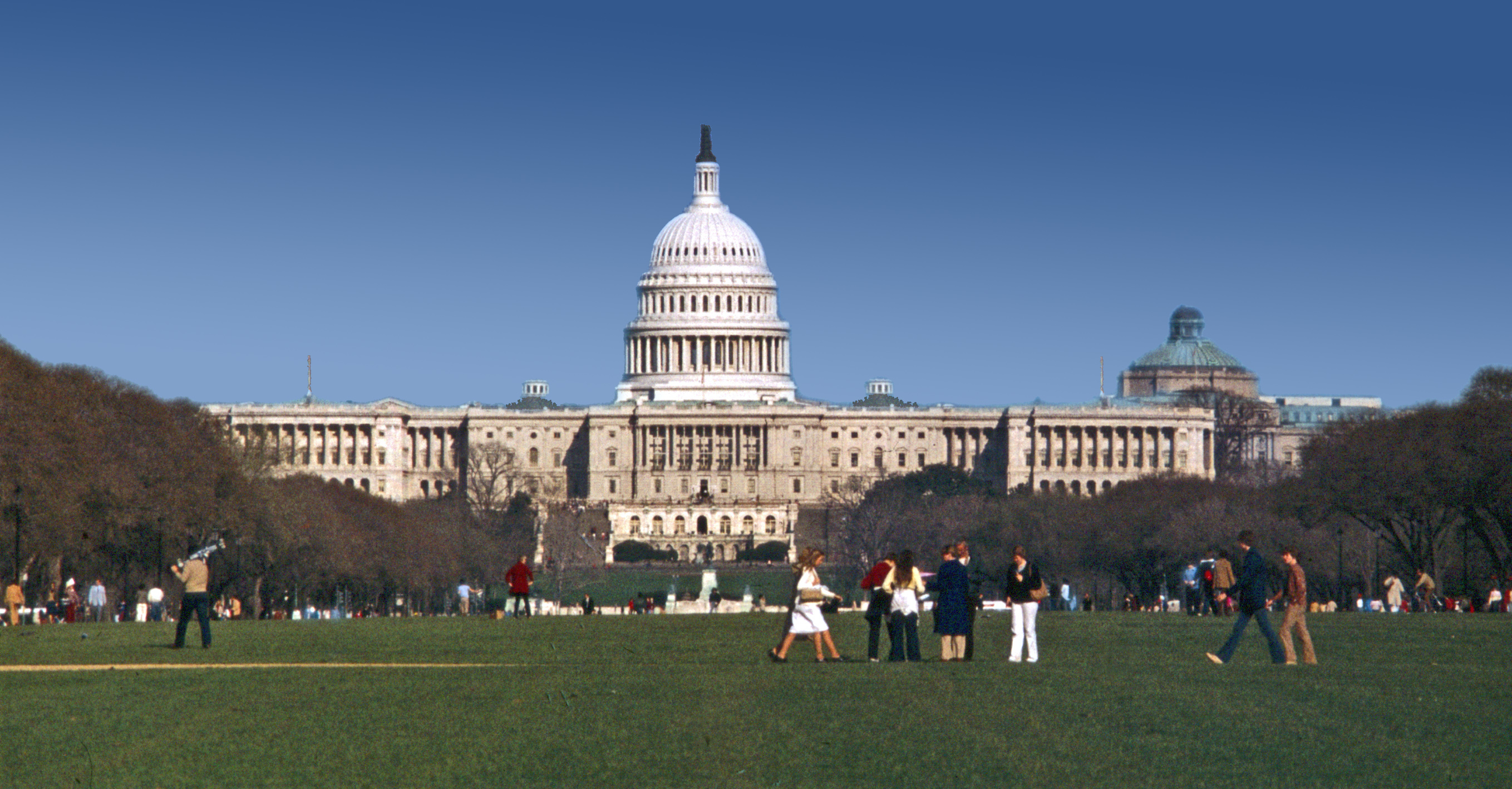
- United States Capitol (1980)

Overview
- Legislative body: United States Congress
- Jurisdiction: United States
- Term: January 3, 1983 – January 3, 1985

Senate
- Members: 100
- President: George H. W. Bush (R)
- President pro tempore: Strom Thurmond (R)
- Party control: Republican

House of Representatives
- Members: 435 representatives 5 non-voting delegates
- Speaker: Tip O'Neill (D)
- Party control: Democratic

Sessions
- 1st: January 3, 1983 – November 18, 1983
- 2nd: January 23, 1984 – October 12, 1984

The 98th United States Congress was a meeting of the legislative branch of the United States federal government, composed of the United States Senate and the United States House of Representatives. It met in Washington, D.C., from January 3, 1983, to January 3, 1985, during the third and fourth years of Ronald Reagan's presidency. The apportionment of seats in the House of Representatives was based on the 1980 U.S. census.

The Republicans maintained control of the Senate, while the Democrats increased their majority in the House of Representatives from the 97th Congress.

== Major events ==
- February 24, 1983: A special commission of the Congress released a report critical of the practice of Japanese internment during World War II.
- March 23, 1983: President Ronald Reagan made his Strategic Defense Initiative proposal.
- April 18, 1983: U.S. Embassy bombed in Beirut, killing 63 people.
- October 23, 1983: Simultaneous suicide truck-bombings destroyed both the French and the United States Marine Corps barracks in Beirut, killing 241 U.S. servicemen, 58 French paratroopers and 6 Lebanese civilians.
- October 25, 1983: United States troops invaded Grenada
- November 6, 1984:
  - 1984 United States presidential election: Re-election of Ronald Reagan
  - 1984 United States Senate elections: Republicans retained Senate, but lost 2 seats
  - 1984 United States House of Representatives elections: Democrats retained House, but lost 16 seats

== Major legislation ==
- April 20, 1983: Social Security Amendments of 1983, Pub. L. 98–21
- August 26, 1983: Extra-Long Staple Cotton Act of 1983, Pub. L. 98–88, 97 Stat. 494
- November 2, 1983: Martin Luther King Jr. Day law, Pub. L. 98–399
- March 20, 1984: Shipping Act of 1984, Pub. L. 98–237, 98 Stat. 67
- July 17, 1984: Land Remote-Sensing Commercialization Act of 1984, Pub. L. 98–365
- July 17, 1984: National Minimum Drinking Age Act, Pub. L. 98–363
- August 11, 1984: Equal Access Act
- September 24, 1984: Drug Price Competition and Patent Term Restoration Act, Pub. L. 98–417, 98 Stat. 1585
- September 28, 1984: Voting Accessibility for the Elderly and Handicapped Act, Pub. L. 98–435
- October 3, 1984: Secondary Mortgage Market Enhancement Act, Pub. L. 98–440, 98 Stat. 1689
- October 12, 1984: Comprehensive Crime Control Act, Pub. L. 98–473, title II
- October 12, 1984: Armed Career Criminal Act, Pub. L. 98–473, 98 Stat. 2185
- October 12, 1984: Comprehensive Smoking Education Act, Pub. L. 98–474, 98 Stat. 2200
- October 12, 1984: Controlled Substances Penalties Amendments Act of 1984, Pub. L. 98–473, 98 Stat. 1837
- October 19, 1984: National Archives and Records Administration Act, Pub. L. 98–497
- October 19, 1984: Aviation Drug-Trafficking Control Act of 1984, Pub. L. 98–499
- October 19, 1984: National Organ Transplant Act of 1984, Pub. L. 98–507, 98 Stat. 2339
- October 30, 1984: Commercial Space Launch Act of 1984, Pub. L. 98–575
- October 30, 1984: Cable Communications Policy Act of 1984, Pub. L. 98–549, 98 Stat. 2779
- October 30, 1984: Trade and Tariff Act of 1984, Pub. L. 98–573
- November 8, 1984: National Fishing Enhancement Act of 1984, Pub. L. 98–623, 98 Stat. 3394
- November 8, 1984: Semiconductor Chip Protection Act of 1984, Pub. L. 98–620, 98 Stat. 3335

== Party summary ==
=== Senate ===
Party standings at the end of the 98th Congress 45 Democratic senators 55 Republican senators

	Party (shading shows control)			Total	Vacant
	Democratic (D)	Independent (I)	Republican (R)	Total	Vacant
End of previous congress	46	1	53	100	0
Begin	46	0	54	100	0
End	45	0	55	100	0
Final voting share	45.0%	0.0%	55.0%		
Beginning of next congress	46	0	53	99	1

=== House of Representatives ===
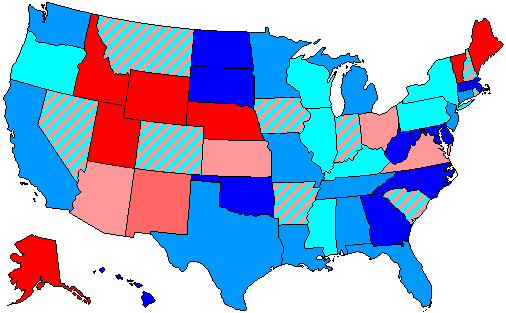
House seats by party holding plurality in state 80+% to 100% Democratic 80+% to 100% Republican 60+% to 80% Democratic 60+% to 80% Republican 50+% to 60% Democratic 50+% to 60% Republican striped: 50–50 split

	Party (shading shows control)			Total	Vacant
	Democratic (D)	Republican (R)	Conservative (C)	Total	Vacant
End of previous congress	242	191	1	434	1
Begin	269	164	1	434	1
End	267	166	1	434	1
Final voting share	61.5%	38.2%	0.2%		
Beginning of next congress	252	181	1	434	1

== Leadership ==
Senate President

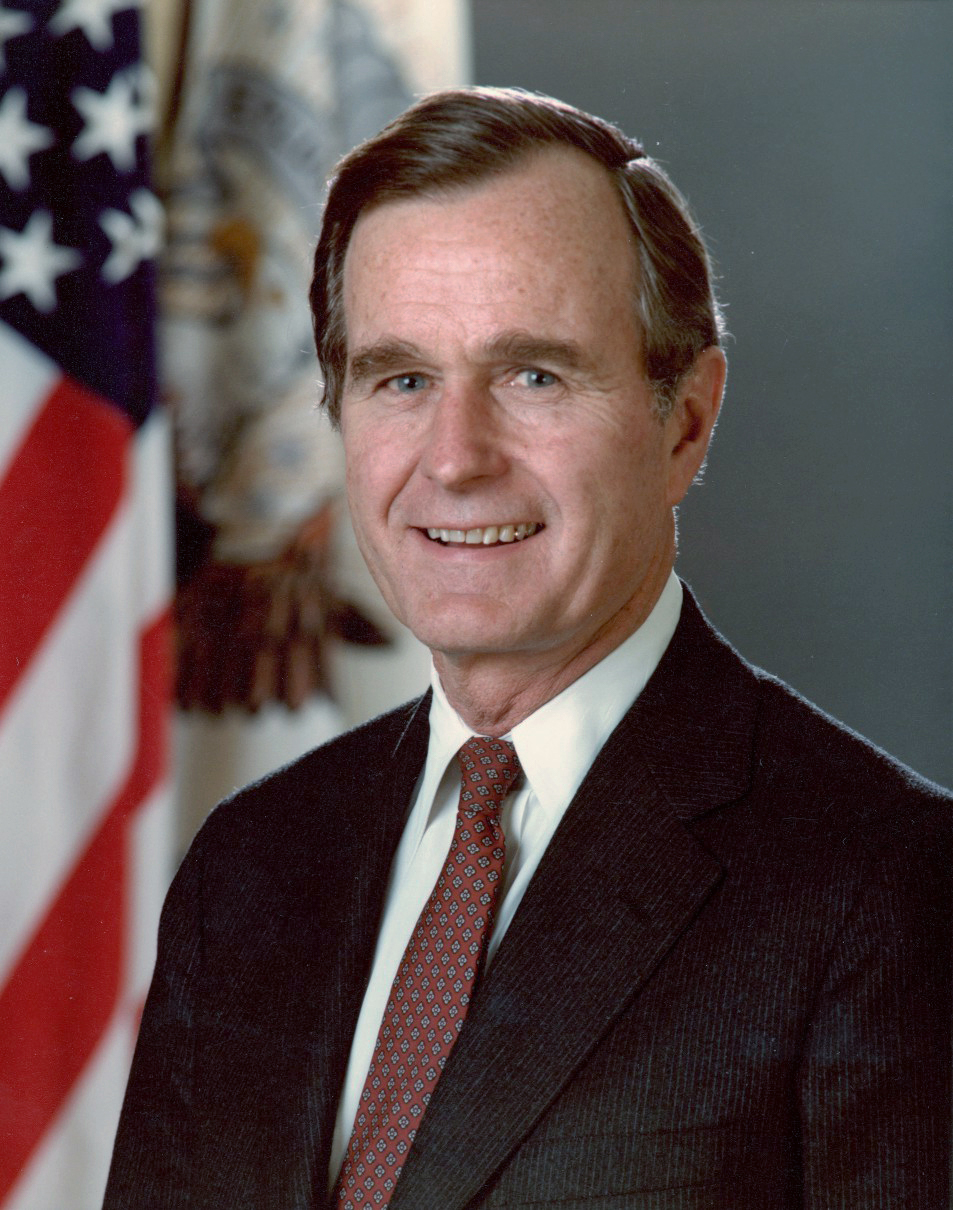
George H. W. Bush (R)

Senate President pro tempore

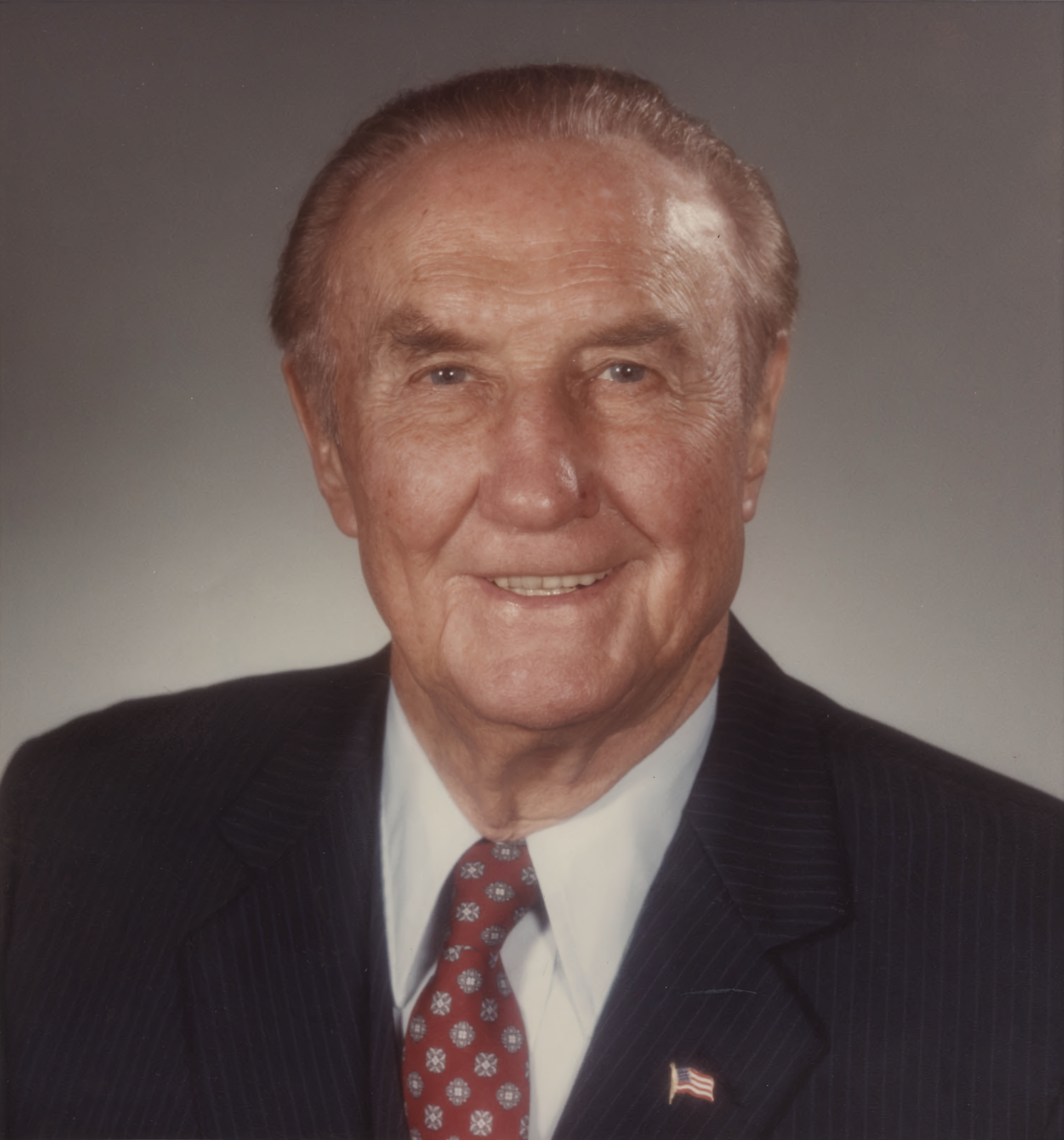
Strom Thurmond (R)

House Speaker

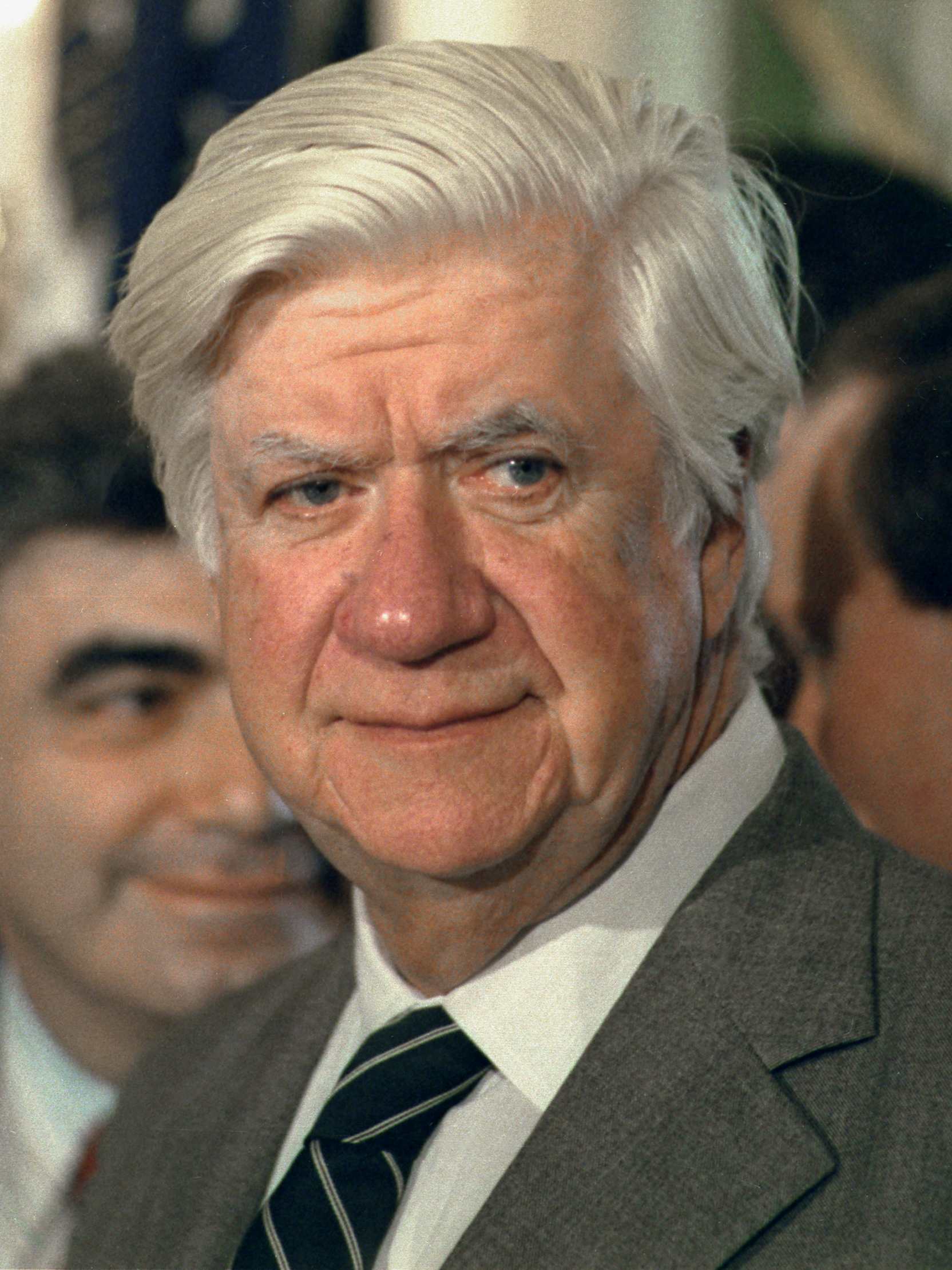
Tip O'Neill (D)

=== Senate ===
- President: George H. W. Bush (R)
- President pro tempore: Strom Thurmond (R)

==== Majority (Republican) leadership ====
- Majority Leader: Howard Baker
- Majority Whip: Ted Stevens
- Republican Conference Chairman: Jim McClure
- Republican Conference Secretary: Jake Garn
- National Senatorial Committee Chair: Richard Lugar
- Policy Committee Chairman: John Tower

==== Minority (Democratic) leadership ====
- Minority Leader and Democratic Conference Chairman: Robert Byrd
- Minority Whip: Alan Cranston
- Democratic Caucus Secretary: Daniel Inouye
- Democratic Campaign Committee Chairman: Lloyd Bentsen

=== House of Representatives ===
- Speaker: Tip O'Neill (D)

==== Majority (Democratic) leadership ====
- Majority Leader: Jim Wright
- Majority Whip: Tom Foley
- Chief Deputy Majority Whip: Bill Alexander
- Democratic Caucus Chairman: Gillis William Long
- Democratic Caucus Secretary: Geraldine Ferraro
- Democratic Campaign Committee Chairman: Tony Coelho

==== Minority (Republican) leadership ====
- Minority Leader: Robert H. Michel
- Minority Whip: Trent Lott
- Chief Deputy Whip: Tom Loeffler
- Republican Conference Chairman: Jack Kemp
- Republican Conference Vice-Chairman: Jack Edwards
- Republican Conference Secretary: Clair Burgener
- Policy Committee Chairman: Dick Cheney
- Republican Campaign Committee Chairman: Guy Vander Jagt

== Caucuses ==
- Congressional Arts Caucus
- Congressional Black Caucus
- Congressional Hispanic Caucus
- Congressional Friends of Ireland Caucus
- Congressional Pediatric & Adult Hydrocephalus Caucus
- Congressional Travel & Tourism Caucus
- Congresswomen's Caucus
- House Democratic Caucus
- Senate Democratic Caucus

== Members ==
This list is arranged by chamber, then by state. Senators are listed by class and representatives are listed by district.

=== Senate ===
Senators are elected statewide every two years, with approximately one-third beginning new six-year terms with each Congress, In this Congress, Class 2 meant their term ended with this Congress, facing re-election in 1984; Class 3 meant their term began in the last Congress, facing re-election in 1986; and Class 1 meant their term began in this Congress, facing re-election in 1988.

==== Alabama ====
▌2. Howell Heflin (D)
▌3. Jeremiah Denton (R)

==== Alaska ====
▌2. Ted Stevens (R)
▌3. Frank Murkowski (R)

==== Arizona ====
▌1. Dennis DeConcini (D)
▌3. Barry Goldwater (R)

==== Arkansas ====
▌2. David Pryor (D)
▌3. Dale Bumpers (D)

==== California ====
▌1. Pete Wilson (R)
▌3. Alan Cranston (D)

==== Colorado ====
▌2. William L. Armstrong (R)
▌3. Gary Hart (D)

==== Connecticut ====
▌1. Lowell Weicker (R)
▌3. Chris Dodd (D)

==== Delaware ====
▌1. William Roth (R)
▌2. Joe Biden (D)

==== Florida ====
▌1. Lawton Chiles (D)
▌3. Paula Hawkins (R)

==== Georgia ====
▌2. Sam Nunn (D)
▌3. Mack Mattingly (R)

==== Hawaii ====
▌1. Spark Matsunaga (D)
▌3. Daniel Inouye (D)

==== Idaho ====
▌2. Jim McClure (R)
▌3. Steve Symms (R)

==== Illinois ====
▌2. Charles H. Percy (R)
▌3. Alan J. Dixon (D)

==== Indiana ====
▌1. Richard Lugar (R)
▌3. Dan Quayle (R)

==== Iowa ====
▌2. Roger Jepsen (R)
▌3. Chuck Grassley (R)

==== Kansas ====
▌2. Nancy Kassebaum (R)
▌3. Bob Dole (R)

==== Kentucky ====
▌2. Walter Dee Huddleston (D)
▌3. Wendell Ford (D)

==== Louisiana ====
▌2. J. Bennett Johnston (D)
▌3. Russell B. Long (D)

==== Maine ====
▌1. George J. Mitchell (D)
▌2. William Cohen (R)

==== Maryland ====
▌1. Paul Sarbanes (D)
▌3. Charles Mathias (R)

==== Massachusetts ====
▌1. Ted Kennedy (D)
▌2. Paul Tsongas (D), until January 2, 1985

▌John Kerry (D), from January 2, 1985

==== Michigan ====
▌1. Donald Riegle (D)
▌2. Carl Levin (D)

==== Minnesota ====
▌1. David Durenberger (I-R) (Note: The Republican Party of Minnesota was officially known as the Independent-Republicans of Minnesota from November 15, 1975, until September 23, 1995, and are counted as Republicans.)
▌2. Rudy Boschwitz (I-R)

==== Mississippi ====
▌1. John C. Stennis (D)
▌2. Thad Cochran (R)

==== Missouri ====
▌1. John Danforth (R)
▌3. Thomas Eagleton (D)

==== Montana ====
▌1. John Melcher (D)
▌2. Max Baucus (D)

==== Nebraska ====
▌1. Edward Zorinsky (D)
▌2. J. James Exon (D)

==== Nevada ====
▌1. Chic Hecht (R)
▌3. Paul Laxalt (R)

==== New Hampshire ====
▌2. Gordon J. Humphrey (R)
▌3. Warren Rudman (R)

==== New Jersey ====
▌1. Frank Lautenberg (D)
▌2. Bill Bradley (D)

==== New Mexico ====
▌1. Jeff Bingaman (D)
▌2. Pete Domenici (R)

==== New York ====
▌1. Daniel Patrick Moynihan (D)
▌3. Al D'Amato (R)

==== North Carolina ====
▌2. Jesse Helms (R)
▌3. John Porter East (R)

==== North Dakota ====
▌1. Quentin Burdick (D-NPL) (Note: The Minnesota Democratic–Farmer–Labor Party (DFL) and the North Dakota Democratic-Nonpartisan League Party (D-NPL) are the Minnesota and North Dakota affiliates of the U.S. Democratic Party and are counted as Democrats.)
▌3. Mark Andrews (R)

==== Ohio ====
▌1. Howard Metzenbaum (D)
▌3. John Glenn (D)

==== Oklahoma ====
▌2. David Boren (D)
▌3. Don Nickles (R)

==== Oregon ====
▌2. Mark Hatfield (R)
▌3. Bob Packwood (R)

==== Pennsylvania ====
▌1. John Heinz (R)
▌3. Arlen Specter (R)

==== Rhode Island ====
▌1. John Chafee (R)
▌2. Claiborne Pell (D)

==== South Carolina ====
▌2. Strom Thurmond (R)
▌3. Fritz Hollings (D)

==== South Dakota ====
▌2. Larry Pressler (R)
▌3. James Abdnor (R)

==== Tennessee ====
▌1. Jim Sasser (D)
▌2. Howard Baker (R)

==== Texas ====
▌1. Lloyd Bentsen (D)
▌2. John Tower (R)

==== Utah ====
▌1. Orrin Hatch (R)
▌3. Jake Garn (R)

==== Vermont ====
▌1. Robert Stafford (R)
▌3. Patrick Leahy (D)

==== Virginia ====
▌1. Paul Trible (R)
▌2. John Warner (R)

==== Washington ====
▌1. Henry M. Jackson (D), until September 1, 1983

▌Daniel J. Evans (R), from September 12, 1983

▌3. Slade Gorton (R)

==== West Virginia ====
▌1. Robert Byrd (D)
▌2. Jennings Randolph (D)

==== Wisconsin ====
▌1. William Proxmire (D)
▌3. Bob Kasten (R)

==== Wyoming ====
▌1. Malcolm Wallop (R)
▌2. Alan Simpson (R)

Senators' party membership by state at the opening of the 98th Congress in January 1983 2 Democrats 1 Democrat and 1 Republican 2 Republicans

Senate majority leadership

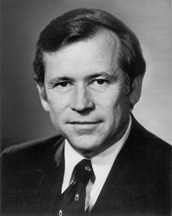
Republican leader
Howard Baker

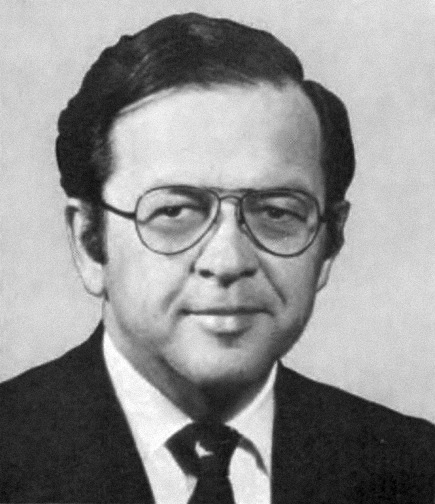
Republican whip
Ted Stevens

Senate minority leadership

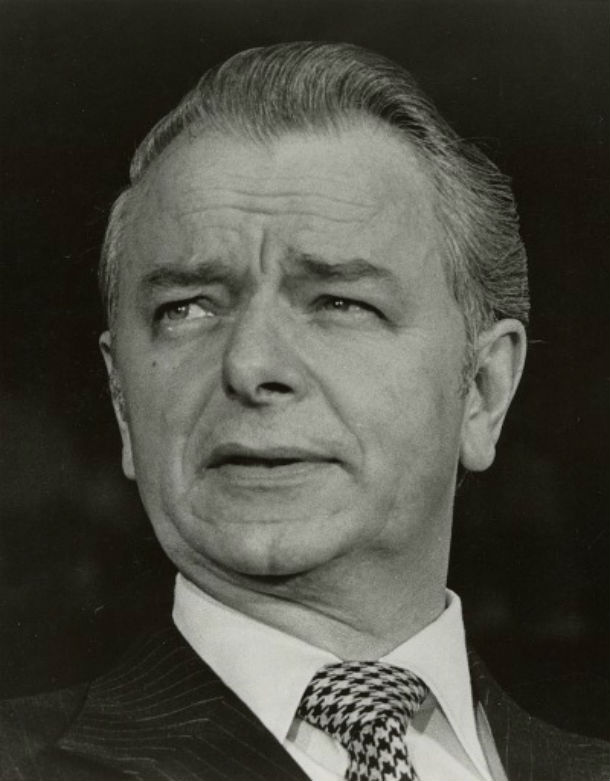
Democratic leader
Robert Byrd

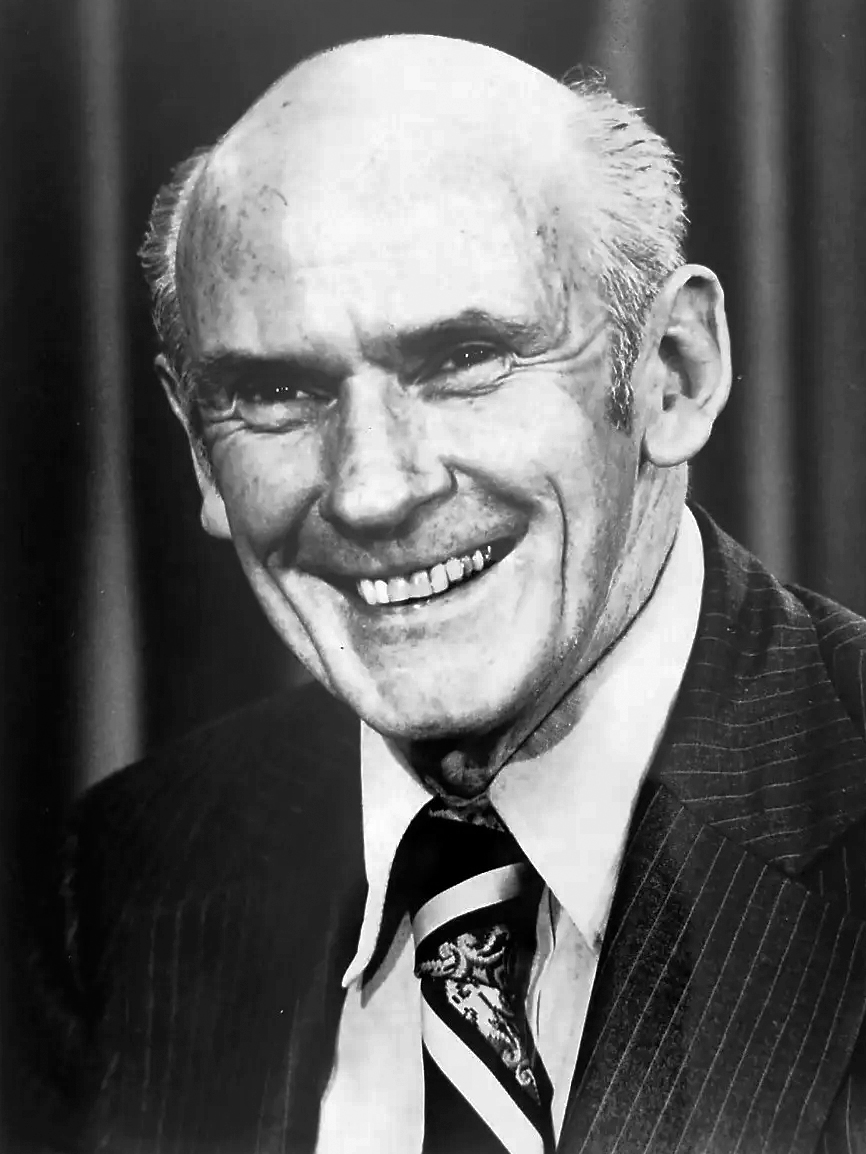
Democratic whip
Alan Cranston

=== House of Representatives ===
==== Alabama ====
▌1. Jack Edwards (R)
▌2. William L. Dickinson (R)
▌3. Bill Nichols (D)
▌4. Tom Bevill (D)
▌5. Ronnie Flippo (D)
▌6. Ben Erdreich (D)
▌7. Richard Shelby (D)

==== Alaska ====
▌At-large. Don Young (R)

==== Arizona ====
▌1. John McCain (R)
▌2. Mo Udall (D)
▌3. Bob Stump (R)
▌4. Eldon Rudd (R)
▌5. James F. McNulty Jr. (D)

==== Arkansas ====
▌1. Bill Alexander (D)
▌2. Ed Bethune (R)
▌3. John Paul Hammerschmidt (R)
▌4. Beryl Anthony Jr. (D)

==== California ====
▌1. Douglas Bosco (D)
▌2. Eugene A. Chappie (R)
▌3. Bob Matsui (D)
▌4. Vic Fazio (D)
▌5. Phillip Burton (D), until April 10, 1983

▌Sala Burton (D), from June 21, 1983

▌6. Barbara Boxer (D)
▌7. George Miller (D)
▌8. Ron Dellums (D)
▌9. Pete Stark (D)
▌10. Don Edwards (D)
▌11. Tom Lantos (D)
▌12. Ed Zschau (R)
▌13. Norman Mineta (D)
▌14. Norman D. Shumway (R)
▌15. Tony Coelho (D)
▌16. Leon Panetta (D)
▌17. Chip Pashayan (R)
▌18. Richard H. Lehman (D)
▌19. Robert Lagomarsino (R)
▌20. Bill Thomas (R)
▌21. Bobbi Fiedler (R)
▌22. Carlos Moorhead (R)
▌23. Anthony Beilenson (D)
▌24. Henry Waxman (D)
▌25. Edward R. Roybal (D)
▌26. Howard Berman (D)
▌27. Mel Levine (D)
▌28. Julian Dixon (D)
▌29. Augustus Hawkins (D)
▌30. Matthew G. Martínez (D)
▌31. Mervyn Dymally (D)
▌32. Glenn M. Anderson (D)
▌33. David Dreier (R)
▌34. Esteban Edward Torres (D)
▌35. Jerry Lewis (R)
▌36. George Brown Jr. (D)
▌37. Al McCandless (R)
▌38. Jerry M. Patterson (D)
▌39. William Dannemeyer (R)
▌40. Robert Badham (R)
▌41. Bill Lowery (R)
▌42. Dan Lungren (R)
▌43. Ron Packard (R)
▌44. Jim Bates (D)
▌45. Duncan L. Hunter (R)

==== Colorado ====
▌1. Pat Schroeder (D)
▌2. Tim Wirth (D)
▌3. Ray Kogovsek (D)
▌4. Hank Brown (R)
▌5. Ken Kramer (R)
▌6. Dan Schaefer (R), from March 29, 1983 (Note: In Colorado's 6th district: member-elect Jack Swigert (R) died December 27, 1982, before the term started.) (Note: In Colorado's 6th district: Dan Schaefer (R) won a special election on March 29, 1983. He was sworn in the same day.)

==== Connecticut ====
▌1. Barbara Kennelly (D)
▌2. Sam Gejdenson (D)
▌3. Bruce Morrison (D)
▌4. Stewart McKinney (R)
▌5. William R. Ratchford (D)
▌6. Nancy Johnson (R)

==== Delaware ====
▌At-large. Tom Carper (D)

==== Florida ====
▌1. Earl Hutto (D)
▌2. Don Fuqua (D)
▌3. Charles E. Bennett (D)
▌4. Bill Chappell (D)
▌5. Bill McCollum (R)
▌6. Buddy MacKay (D)
▌7. Sam Gibbons (D)
▌8. Bill Young (R)
▌9. Michael Bilirakis (R)
▌▌10. Andy Ireland (D, then R)
▌11. Bill Nelson (D)
▌12. Tom Lewis (R)
▌13. Connie Mack III (R)
▌14. Dan Mica (D)
▌15. Clay Shaw (R)
▌16. Lawrence J. Smith (D)
▌17. William Lehman (D)
▌18. Claude Pepper (D)
▌19. Dante Fascell (D)

==== Georgia ====
▌1. Lindsay Thomas (D)
▌2. Charles Hatcher (D)
▌3. Richard Ray (D)
▌4. Elliott H. Levitas (D)
▌5. Wyche Fowler (D)
▌6. Newt Gingrich (R)
▌7. Larry McDonald (D), until September 1, 1983

▌George Darden (D), from November 8, 1983

▌8. J. Roy Rowland (D)
▌9. Ed Jenkins (D)
▌10. Doug Barnard Jr. (D)

==== Hawaii ====
▌1. Cecil Heftel (D)
▌2. Daniel Akaka (D)

==== Idaho ====
▌1. Larry Craig (R)
▌2. George V. Hansen (R)

==== Illinois ====
▌1. Harold Washington (D), until April 30, 1983

▌Charles Hayes (D), from August 23, 1983

▌2. Gus Savage (D)
▌3. Marty Russo (D)
▌4. George M. O'Brien (R)
▌5. Bill Lipinski (D)
▌6. Henry Hyde (R)
▌7. Cardiss Collins (D)
▌8. Dan Rostenkowski (D)
▌9. Sidney Yates (D)
▌10. John Porter (R)
▌11. Frank Annunzio (D)
▌12. Phil Crane (R)
▌13. John N. Erlenborn (R)
▌14. Tom Corcoran (R), until November 28, 1984
▌15. Ed Madigan (R)
▌16. Lynn M. Martin (R)
▌17. Lane Evans (D)
▌18. Robert H. Michel (R)
▌19. Dan Crane (R)
▌20. Dick Durbin (D)
▌21. Melvin Price (D)
▌22. Paul Simon (D)

==== Indiana ====
▌1. Katie Hall (D)
▌2. Philip Sharp (D)
▌3. John P. Hiler (R)
▌4. Dan Coats (R)
▌5. Elwood Hillis (R)
▌6. Dan Burton (R)
▌7. John T. Myers (R)
▌8. Frank McCloskey (D)
▌9. Lee Hamilton (D)
▌10. Andrew Jacobs Jr. (D)

==== Iowa ====
▌1. Jim Leach (R)
▌2. Tom Tauke (R)
▌3. T. Cooper Evans (R)
▌4. Neal Smith (D)
▌5. Tom Harkin (D)
▌6. Berkley Bedell (D)

==== Kansas ====
▌1. Pat Roberts (R)
▌2. Jim Slattery (D)
▌3. Larry Winn (R)
▌4. Dan Glickman (D)
▌5. Bob Whittaker (R)

==== Kentucky ====
▌1. Carroll Hubbard (D)
▌2. William Natcher (D)
▌3. Romano Mazzoli (D)
▌4. Gene Snyder (R)
▌5. Hal Rogers (R)
▌6. Larry J. Hopkins (R)
▌7. Carl D. Perkins (D), until August 3, 1984

▌Chris Perkins (D), from November 6, 1984

==== Louisiana ====
▌1. Bob Livingston (R)
▌2. Lindy Boggs (D)
▌3. Billy Tauzin (D)
▌4. Buddy Roemer (D)
▌5. Jerry Huckaby (D)
▌6. Henson Moore (R)
▌7. John Breaux (D)
▌8. Gillis William Long (D)

==== Maine ====
▌1. John R. McKernan Jr. (R)
▌2. Olympia Snowe (R)

==== Maryland ====
▌1. Roy Dyson (D)
▌2. Clarence Long (D)
▌3. Barbara Mikulski (D)
▌4. Marjorie Holt (R)
▌5. Steny Hoyer (D)
▌6. Beverly Byron (D)
▌7. Parren Mitchell (D)
▌8. Michael D. Barnes (D)

==== Massachusetts ====
▌1. Silvio O. Conte (R)
▌2. Edward Boland (D)
▌3. Joseph D. Early (D)
▌4. Barney Frank (D)
▌5. James Shannon (D)
▌6. Nicholas Mavroules (D)
▌7. Ed Markey (D)
▌8. Tip O'Neill (D)
▌9. Joe Moakley (D)
▌10. Gerry Studds (D)
▌11. Brian J. Donnelly (D)

==== Michigan ====
▌1. John Conyers (D)
▌2. Carl Pursell (R)
▌3. Howard Wolpe (D)
▌4. Mark D. Siljander (R)
▌5. Harold S. Sawyer (R)
▌6. Bob Carr (D)
▌7. Dale Kildee (D)
▌8. J. Bob Traxler (D)
▌9. Guy Vander Jagt (R)
▌10. Donald J. Albosta (D)
▌11. Bob Davis (R)
▌12. David Bonior (D)
▌13. George Crockett Jr. (D)
▌14. Dennis Hertel (D)
▌15. William D. Ford (D)
▌16. John Dingell (D)
▌17. Sander Levin (D)
▌18. William Broomfield (R)

==== Minnesota ====
▌1. Tim Penny (DFL)
▌2. Vin Weber (I-R)
▌3. Bill Frenzel (I-R)
▌4. Bruce Vento (DFL)
▌5. Martin Olav Sabo (DFL)
▌6. Gerry Sikorski (DFL)
▌7. Arlan Stangeland (I-R)
▌8. Jim Oberstar (DFL)

==== Mississippi ====
▌1. Jamie Whitten (D)
▌2. Webb Franklin (R)
▌3. Sonny Montgomery (D)
▌4. Wayne Dowdy (D)
▌5. Trent Lott (R)

==== Missouri ====
▌1. Bill Clay (D)
▌2. Robert A. Young (D)
▌3. Dick Gephardt (D)
▌4. Ike Skelton (D)
▌5. Alan Wheat (D)
▌6. Tom Coleman (R)
▌7. Gene Taylor (R)
▌8. Bill Emerson (R)
▌9. Harold Volkmer (D)

==== Montana ====
▌1. Pat Williams (D)
▌2. Ron Marlenee (R)

==== Nebraska ====
▌1. Doug Bereuter (R)
▌2. Hal Daub (R)
▌3. Virginia D. Smith (R)

==== Nevada ====
▌1. Harry Reid (D)
▌2. Barbara Vucanovich (R)

==== New Hampshire ====
▌1. Norman D'Amours (D)
▌2. Judd Gregg (R)

==== New Jersey ====
▌1. James Florio (D)
▌2. William J. Hughes (D)
▌3. James J. Howard (D)
▌4. Chris Smith (R)
▌5. Marge Roukema (R)
▌6. Bernard J. Dwyer (D)
▌7. Matthew J. Rinaldo (R)
▌8. Robert A. Roe (D)
▌9. Robert Torricelli (D)
▌10. Peter W. Rodino (D)
▌11. Joseph Minish (D)
▌12. Jim Courter (R)
▌13. Edwin B. Forsythe (R), until March 29, 1984

▌Jim Saxton (R), from November 6, 1984

▌14. Frank J. Guarini (D)

==== New Mexico ====
▌1. Manuel Lujan Jr. (R)
▌2. Joe Skeen (R)
▌3. Bill Richardson (D)

==== New York ====
▌1. William Carney (C) (Note: Caucused with the Republicans.)
▌2. Thomas Downey (D)
▌3. Robert J. Mrazek (D)
▌4. Norman F. Lent (R)
▌5. Raymond J. McGrath (R)
▌6. Joseph P. Addabbo (D)
▌7. Benjamin Rosenthal (D), until January 4, 1983

▌Gary Ackerman (D), from March 1, 1983

▌8. James H. Scheuer (D)
▌9. Geraldine Ferraro (D)
▌10. Chuck Schumer (D)
▌11. Edolphus Towns (D)
▌12. Major Owens (D)
▌13. Stephen Solarz (D)
▌14. Guy Molinari (R)
▌15. Bill Green (R)
▌16. Charles Rangel (D)
▌17. Ted Weiss (D)
▌18. Robert Garcia (D)
▌19. Mario Biaggi (D)
▌20. Richard Ottinger (D)
▌21. Hamilton Fish IV (R)
▌22. Benjamin Gilman (R)
▌23. Samuel S. Stratton (D)
▌24. Gerald Solomon (R)
▌25. Sherwood Boehlert (R)
▌26. David O'Brien Martin (R)
▌27. George C. Wortley (R)
▌28. Matthew F. McHugh (D)
▌29. Frank Horton (R)
▌30. Barber Conable (R)
▌31. Jack Kemp (R)
▌32. John LaFalce (D)
▌33. Henry J. Nowak (D)
▌34. Stan Lundine (D)

==== North Carolina ====
▌1. Walter B. Jones Sr. (D)
▌2. Tim Valentine (D)
▌3. Charles Whitley (D)
▌4. Ike Franklin Andrews (D)
▌5. Stephen L. Neal (D)
▌6. Charles Robin Britt (D)
▌7. Charlie Rose (D)
▌8. Bill Hefner (D)
▌9. James G. Martin (R)
▌10. Jim Broyhill (R)
▌11. James M. Clarke (D)

==== North Dakota ====
▌At-large. Byron Dorgan (D-NPL)

==== Ohio ====
▌1. Tom Luken (D)
▌2. Bill Gradison (R)
▌3. Tony P. Hall (D)
▌4. Mike Oxley (R)
▌5. Del Latta (R)
▌6. Bob McEwen (R)
▌7. Mike DeWine (R)
▌8. Tom Kindness (R)
▌9. Marcy Kaptur (D)
▌10. Clarence E. Miller (R)
▌11. Dennis E. Eckart (D)
▌12. John Kasich (R)
▌13. Don Pease (D)
▌14. John F. Seiberling (D)
▌15. Chalmers Wylie (R)
▌16. Ralph Regula (R)
▌17. Lyle Williams (R)
▌18. Douglas Applegate (D)
▌19. Ed Feighan (D)
▌20. Mary Rose Oakar (D)
▌21. Louis Stokes (D)

==== Oklahoma ====
▌1. James R. Jones (D)
▌2. Mike Synar (D)
▌3. Wes Watkins (D)
▌4. Dave McCurdy (D)
▌5. Mickey Edwards (R)
▌6. Glenn English (D)

==== Oregon ====
▌1. Les AuCoin (D)
▌2. Bob Smith (R)
▌3. Ron Wyden (D)
▌4. Jim Weaver (D)
▌5. Denny Smith (R)

==== Pennsylvania ====
▌1. Thomas M. Foglietta (D)
▌2. William H. Gray III (D)
▌3. Robert Borski (D)
▌4. Joseph P. Kolter (D)
▌5. Dick Schulze (R)
▌6. Gus Yatron (D)
▌7. Bob Edgar (D)
▌8. Peter H. Kostmayer (D)
▌9. Bud Shuster (R)
▌10. Joseph McDade (R)
▌11. Frank Harrison (D)
▌12. John Murtha (D)
▌13. Lawrence Coughlin (R)
▌14. William J. Coyne (D)
▌15. Donald L. Ritter (R)
▌16. Bob Walker (R)
▌17. George Gekas (R)
▌18. Doug Walgren (D)
▌19. Bill Goodling (R)
▌20. Joseph M. Gaydos (D)
▌21. Tom Ridge (R)
▌22. Austin Murphy (D)
▌23. William Clinger (R)

==== Rhode Island ====
▌1. Fernand St Germain (D)
▌2. Claudine Schneider (R)

==== South Carolina ====
▌1. Thomas F. Hartnett (R)
▌2. Floyd Spence (R)
▌3. Butler Derrick (D)
▌4. Carroll A. Campbell Jr. (R)
▌5. John Spratt (D)
▌6. Robin Tallon (D)

==== South Dakota ====
▌At-large. Tom Daschle (D)

==== Tennessee ====
▌1. Jimmy Quillen (R)
▌2. John Duncan Sr. (R)
▌3. Marilyn Lloyd (D)
▌4. Jim Cooper (D)
▌5. Bill Boner (D)
▌6. Al Gore (D)
▌7. Don Sundquist (R)
▌8. Ed Jones (D)
▌9. Harold Ford Sr. (D)

==== Texas ====
▌1. Sam B. Hall Jr. (D)
▌2. Charlie Wilson (D)
▌3. Steve Bartlett (R)
▌4. Ralph Hall (D)
▌5. John Bryant (D)
▌6. Phil Gramm (D), until January 5, 1983

▌Phil Gramm (R), from February 12, 1983

▌7. Bill Archer (R)
▌8. Jack Fields (R)
▌9. Jack Brooks (D)
▌10. J. J. Pickle (D)
▌11. Marvin Leath (D)
▌12. Jim Wright (D)
▌13. Jack Hightower (D)
▌14. William Neff Patman (D)
▌15. Kika de la Garza (D)
▌16. Ron Coleman (D)
▌17. Charles Stenholm (D)
▌18. Mickey Leland (D)
▌19. Kent Hance (D)
▌20. Henry B. González (D)
▌21. Tom Loeffler (R)
▌22. Ron Paul (R)
▌23. Abraham Kazen (D)
▌24. Martin Frost (D)
▌25. Michael A. Andrews (D)
▌26. Tom Vandergriff (D)
▌27. Solomon Ortiz (D)

==== Utah ====
▌1. Jim Hansen (R)
▌2. David Daniel Marriott (R)
▌3. Howard C. Nielson (R)

==== Vermont ====
▌At-large. Jim Jeffords (R)

==== Virginia ====
▌1. Herb Bateman (R)
▌2. G. William Whitehurst (R)
▌3. Thomas J. Bliley Jr. (R)
▌4. Norman Sisisky (D)
▌5. Dan Daniel (D)
▌6. Jim Olin (D)
▌7. J. Kenneth Robinson (R)
▌8. Stanford Parris (R)
▌9. Rick Boucher (D)
▌10. Frank Wolf (R)

==== Washington ====
▌1. Joel Pritchard (R)
▌2. Al Swift (D)
▌3. Don Bonker (D)
▌4. Sid Morrison (R)
▌5. Tom Foley (D)
▌6. Norm Dicks (D)
▌7. Mike Lowry (D)
▌8. Rod Chandler (R)

==== West Virginia ====
▌1. Alan Mollohan (D)
▌2. Harley O. Staggers Jr. (D)
▌3. Bob Wise (D)
▌4. Nick Rahall (D)

==== Wisconsin ====
▌1. Les Aspin (D)
▌2. Robert Kastenmeier (D)
▌3. Steve Gunderson (R)
▌4. Clement Zablocki (D), until December 3, 1983

▌Jerry Kleczka (D), from April 3, 1984

▌5. Jim Moody (D)
▌6. Tom Petri (R)
▌7. Dave Obey (D)
▌8. Toby Roth (R)
▌9. Jim Sensenbrenner (R)

==== Wyoming ====
▌At-large. Dick Cheney (R)

==== Non-voting members ====
▌American Samoa. Fofō Iosefa Fiti Sunia (D)
▌District of Columbia. Walter Fauntroy (D)
▌Guam. Antonio Borja Won Pat (D)
▌Puerto Rico. Baltasar Corrada del Río (PNP)
▌Virgin Islands. Ron de Lugo (D)

House majority leadership

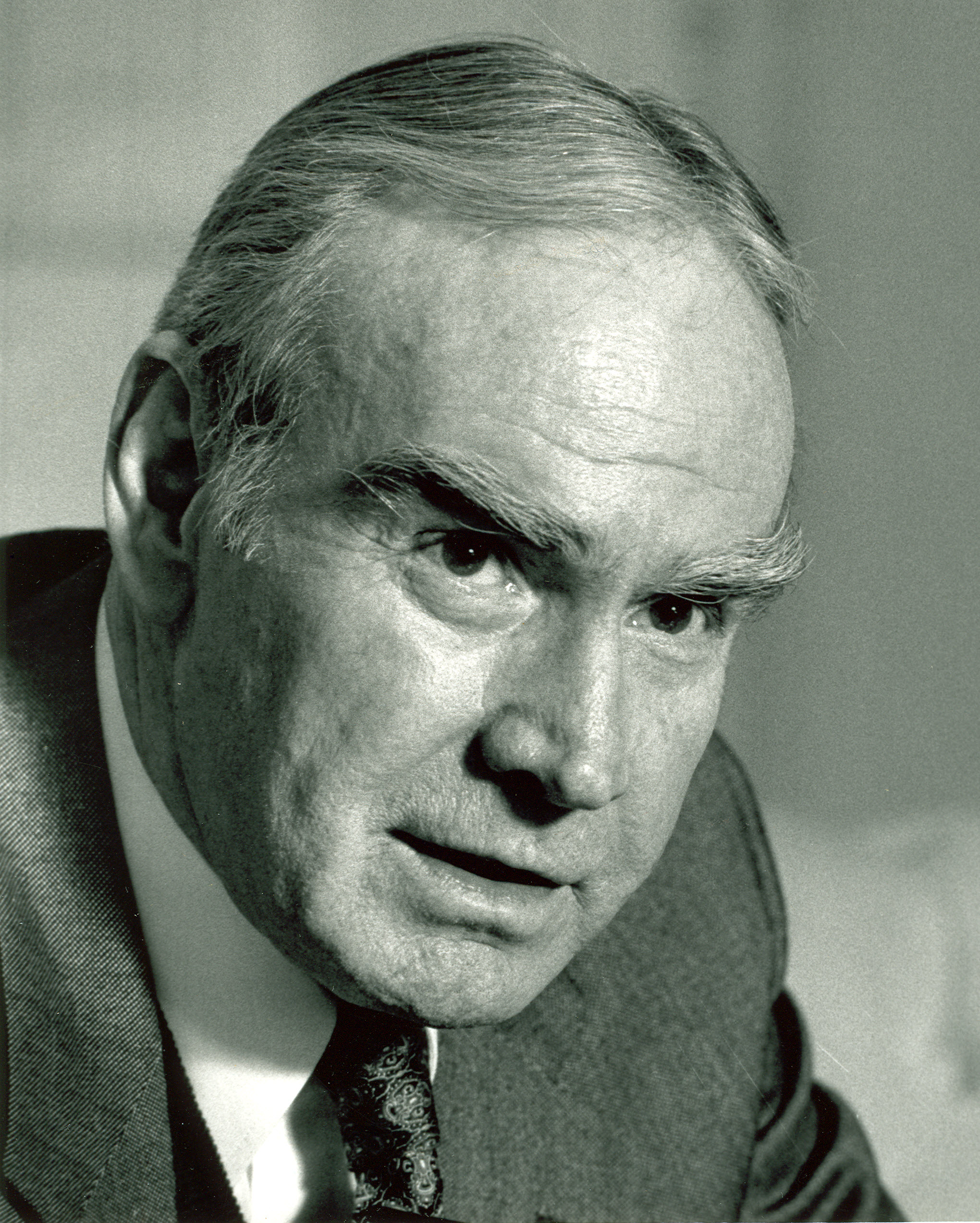
Democratic leader
Jim Wright

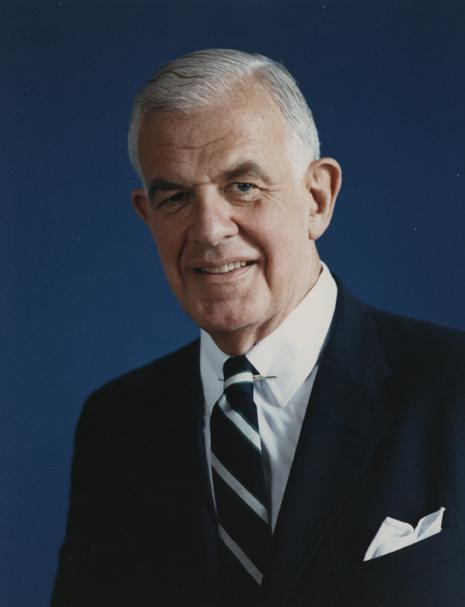
Democratic whip
Tom Foley

House minority leadership

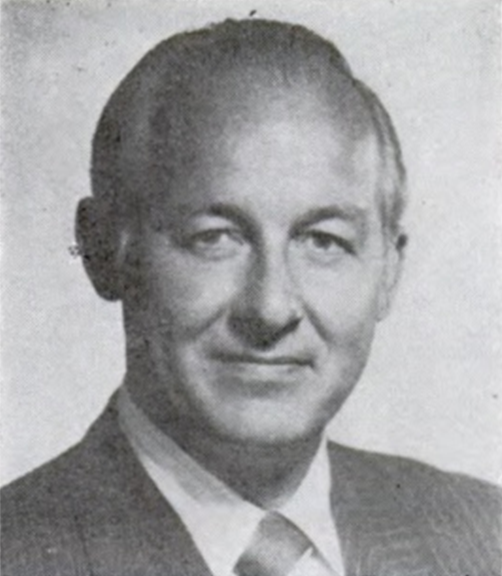
Republican leader
Robert H. Michel

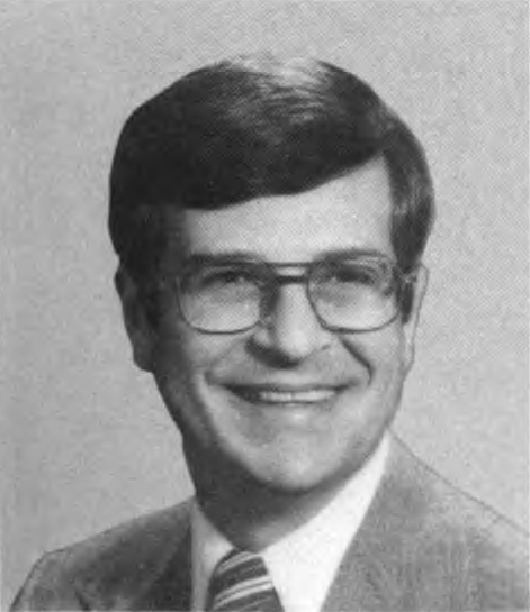
Republican whip
Trent Lott

== Changes in membership ==
=== Senate ===
Senate changes
State (class)	Vacated by	Reason for change	Successor	Date of successor's formal installation (Note: When seated or oath administered, not necessarily when service began.)
Washington (1)	Henry M. Jackson (D)	Incumbent died September 1, 1983. Successor was appointed September 5, 1983 to continue the term and was later elected in the special election on November 8, 1983, to finish the term ending January 3, 1989.	Daniel J. Evans (R)	September 8, 1983
Massachusetts (2)	Paul Tsongas (D)	Incumbent resigned January 2, 1985 due to ill health, to fill the vacancy. Successor was appointed January 2, 1985, having already been elected to the next term.	John Kerry (D)	January 2, 1985

=== House of Representatives ===
House changes
District	Vacated by	Reason for change	Successor	Date of successor's formal installation
New York 7	Benjamin Rosenthal (D)	Incumbent died January 4, 1983. Seat filled in a special election.	Gary Ackerman (D)	March 1, 1983
Texas 6	Phil Gramm (D)	Incumbent resigned January 5, 1983, after being removed from the House Budget Committee for supporting President Ronald Reagan's tax cuts, and then elected to fill his own vacancy. Reinstated after switched his affiliation to Republican.	Phil Gramm (R)	February 12, 1983
Colorado 6	Vacant. District created in the 1980 census.	Member-elect Jack Swigert (R) died December 27, 1982, before his term started. Seat filled in a special election.	Daniel Schaefer (R)	March 29, 1983
California 5	Phillip Burton (D)	Incumbent died April 10, 1983. Seat filled in a special election.	Sala Burton (D)	June 21, 1983
Illinois 1	Harold Washington (D)	Incumbent resigned April 30, 1983, after being installed as Mayor of Chicago. Seat filled in a special election.	Charles Hayes (D)	August 23, 1983
Georgia 7	Larry McDonald (D)	Incumbent died September 1, 1983, onboard the Korean Air Lines Flight 007. Seat filled in a special election.	George Darden (D)	November 8, 1983
Wisconsin 4	Clement Zablocki (D)	Incumbent died December 3, 1983. Seat filled in special election.	Jerry Kleczka (D)	April 3, 1984
New Jersey 13	Edwin B. Forsythe (R)	Incumbent died March 29, 1984. Seat filled in a special election.	Jim Saxton (R)	November 6, 1984
Florida 10	Andy Ireland (D)	Incumbent changed party affiliation July 5, 1984.	Andy Ireland (R)	July 5, 1984
Kentucky 7	Carl D. Perkins (D)	Incumbent died August 3, 1984. Seat filled in a special election.	Chris Perkins (D)	November 6, 1984
Illinois 14	Tom Corcoran (R)	Incumbent resigned November 28, 1984.	Vacant until the next Congress	

== Committees ==
Lists of committees and their party leaders for members of the House and Senate committees can be found through the Official Congressional Directory at the bottom of this article. The directory after the pages of terms of service lists committees of the Senate, House (Standing with Subcommittees, Select and Special) and Joint and, after that, House/Senate committee assignments. On the committees section of the House and Senate in the Official Congressional Directory, the committee's members on the first row on the left side shows the chairman of the committee and on the right side shows the ranking member of the committee.

=== Senate ===
- Aging (Special) (Chair: John Heinz)
- Agriculture, Nutrition and Forestry (Chair: Jesse Helms; Ranking Member: Walter Dee Huddleston)
  - Soil and Water Conservation, Forestry and Environment (Chair: Roger Jepsen; Ranking Member: John Melcher)
  - Agricultural Credit and Rural Electrification (Chair: Paula Hawkins; Ranking Member: Edward Zorinsky)
  - Agricultural Production, Marketing and Stabilization of Prices (Chair: Thad Cochran; Ranking Member: Patrick Leahy)
  - Agricultural Research and General Legislation (Chair: Richard Lugar; Ranking Member: David Boren)
  - Rural Development, Oversight and Investigations (Chair: Mark Andrews; Ranking Member: David Pryor)
  - Foreign Agricultural Policy (Chair: Rudy Boschwitz; Ranking Member: Alan J. Dixon)
  - Nutrition (Chair: Bob Dole; Ranking Member: David Pryor)
- Appropriations (Chair: Mark Hatfield; Ranking Member: John C. Stennis)
  - Agriculture and Related Agencies (Chair: Thad Cochran; Ranking Member: Thomas Eagleton)
  - Defense (Chair: Ted Stevens; Ranking Member: John C. Stennis)
  - District of Columbia (Chair: Arlen Specter; Ranking Member: Patrick Leahy)
  - Energy and Water Development (Chair: Mark Hatfield; Ranking Member: J. Bennett Johnston)
  - Foreign Operations (Chair: Robert Kastenmeier; Ranking Member: Daniel Inouye)
  - HUD-Independent Agencies (Chair: Jake Garn; Ranking Member: Walter Dee Huddleston)
  - Interior (Chair: Jim McClure; Ranking Member: Robert Byrd)
  - Labor-Health, Education and Welfare (Chair: Lowell Weicker; Ranking Member: William Proxmire)
  - Legislative Branch (Chair: Al D'Amato; Ranking Member: Dale Bumpers)
  - Military Construction (Chair: Mack Mattingly; Ranking Member: Jim Sasser)
  - Commerce, Justice, State and Judiciary (Chair: Paul Laxalt; Ranking Member: Fritz Hollings)
  - Transportation (Chair: Mark Andrews; Ranking Member: Lawton Chiles)
  - Treasury, Postal Service and General Government (Chair: James Abdnor; Ranking Member: Dennis DeConcini)
- Armed Services (Chair: John Tower; Ranking Member: Henry M. Jackson)
  - Military Construction (Chair: Strom Thurmond; Ranking Member: Gary Hart)
  - Tactical Warfare (Chair: Barry Goldwater; Ranking Member: Ted Kennedy)
  - Strategic and Theater Nuclear Forces (Chair: John Warner; Ranking Member: Henry M. Jackson)
  - Preparedness (Chair: Gordon J. Humphrey); Ranking Member: Carl Levin)
  - Sea Power and Force Projection (Chair: William Cohen; Ranking Member: Sam Nunn)
  - Manpower and Personnel (Chair: Roger Jepsen; Ranking Member: J. James Exon)
- Banking, Housing and Urban Affairs (Chair: Jake Garn; Ranking Member: William Proxmire)
  - Housing and Urban Affairs (Chair: John Tower; Ranking Member: Donald Riegle)
  - Financial Institutions (Chair: William L. Armstrong; Ranking Member: Alan Cranston)
  - International Finance and Monetary Policy (Chair: John Heinz; Ranking Member: William Proxmire)
  - Securities (Chair: Al D'Amato; Ranking Member: Paul Sarbanes)
  - Economic Policy (Chair: Slade Gorton; Ranking Member: Chris Dodd)
  - Consumer Affairs (Chair: Paula Hawkins; Ranking Member: Chris Dodd)
  - Rural Housing and Development (Chair: Mack Mattingly; Ranking Member: Alan Cranston)
  - Insurance (Chair: Chic Hecht; Ranking Member: Paul Sarbanes)
  - Federal Credit Programs (Chair: Paul Trible; Ranking Member: Jim Sasser)
- Budget (Chair: Pete Domenici; Ranking Member: Lawton Chiles)
- Commerce, Science and Transportation (Chair: Bob Packwood; Ranking Member: Fritz Hollings)
  - Aviation (Chair: Nancy Kassebaum; Ranking Member: J. James Exon)
  - Business, Trade and Tourism (Chair: Larry Pressler; Ranking Member: Donald Riegle)
  - Communications (Chair: Barry Goldwater; Ranking Member: Fritz Hollings)
  - Consumer (Chair: Bob Kasten; Ranking Member: Wendell Ford)
  - Merchant Marine (Chair: Ted Stevens; Ranking Member: Daniel Inouye)
  - Science, Technology and Space (Chair: Slade Gorton; Ranking Member: Howell Heflin)
  - Surface Transportation (Chair: John Danforth; Ranking Member: Russell B. Long)
  - National Ocean Policy Study (Chair: Bob Packwood; Ranking Member: Fritz Hollings)
- Energy and Natural Resources (Chair: Jim McClure; Ranking Member: J. Bennett Johnston)
  - Energy Conservation and Supply (Chair: Lowell Weicker; Ranking Member: Spark Matsunaga)
  - Energy and Mineral Resources (Chair: John Warner; Ranking Member: John Melcher)
  - Energy Regulation (Chair: Frank Murkowski; Ranking Member: Howard Metzenbaum)
  - Energy Research and Development (Chair: Pete Domenici; Ranking Member: Wendell Ford)
  - Public Lands and Reserved Water (Chair: Malcolm Wallop; Ranking Member: Dale Bumpers)
  - Water and Power (Chair: Don Nickles; Ranking Member: Paul Tsongas)
- Environment and Public Works (Chair: Robert Stafford; Ranking Member: Jennings Randolph)
  - Environmental Pollution (Chair: John Chafee; Ranking Member: George J. Mitchell)
  - Nuclear Regulation (Chair: Alan Simpson; Ranking Member: George J. Mitchell; Ranking Member: Gary W. Hart)
  - Water Resources (Chair: James Abdnor; Ranking Member: Daniel Moynihan)
  - Transportation (Chair: Steve Symms; Ranking Member: Lloyd Bentsen)
  - Toxic Substances and Environmental Oversight (Chair: David Durenberger; Ranking Member: Max Baucus)
  - Regional and Community Development (Chair: Gordon J. Humphrey; Ranking Member: Quentin Burdick)
- Ethics (Select) (Chair: Ted Stevens; Vice Chair: Howell Heflin)
- Finance (Chair: Bob Dole; Ranking Member: Russell B. Long)
  - Taxation and Debt Management (Chair: Bob Packwood; Ranking Member: Spark Matsunaga)
  - International Trade (Chair: John Danforth; Ranking Member: Lloyd Bentsen)
  - Savings, Pensions and Investment Policy (Chair: John Chafee; Ranking Member: David Pryor)
  - Economic Growth, Employment and Revenue (Chair: John Heinz; Ranking Member: George J. Mitchell)
  - Energy and Agricultural Taxation (Chair: Malcolm Wallop; Ranking Member: Bill Bradley)
  - Health (Chair: David Durenberger; Ranking Member: Max Baucus)
  - Social Security and Income Maintenance Programs (Chair: William L. Armstrong; Ranking Member: Daniel Moynihan)
  - Estate and Gift Taxation (Chair: Steve Symms; Ranking Member: David Boren)
  - Oversight of the Internal Revenue Service (Chair: Chuck Grassley; Ranking Member: Russell B. Long)
- Foreign Relations (Chair: Charles H. Percy; Ranking Member: Claiborne Pell)
  - International Economic Policy (Chair: Charles Mathias; Ranking Member: Chris Dodd)
  - African Affairs (Chair: Nancy Kassebaum; Ranking Member: Paul Tsongas)
  - East Asian and Pacific Affairs (Chair: Frank Murkowski; Ranking Member: John Glenn)
  - Western Hemisphere Affairs (Chair: Jesse Helms; Ranking Member: Edward Zorinsky)
  - Arms Control, Oceans, International Operations and Environment (Chair: Larry Pressler; Ranking Member: Alan Cranston)
  - Near Eastern and South Asian Affairs (Chair: Rudy Boschwitz; Ranking Member: Paul Sarbanes)
  - European Affairs (Chair: Richard Lugar; Ranking Member: Joe Biden)
- Governmental Affairs (Chair: William Roth; Ranking Member: Thomas Eagleton)
  - Permanent Subcommittee on Investigations (Chair: Charles Mathias; Ranking Member: Sam Nunn)
  - Governmental Efficiency and the District of Columbia (Chair: Charles Mathias; Ranking Member: Thomas Eagleton)
  - Energy, Nuclear Proliferation and Federal Services (Chair: Charles H. Percy; Ranking Member: John Glenn)
  - Information Management and Regulatory Affairs (Chair: John Danforth; Ranking Member: Lawton Chiles)
  - Intergovernmental Relations (Chair: David Durenberger; Ranking Member: Jim Sasser)
  - Civil Service, Post Office and General Services (Chair: Ted Stevens; Ranking Member: Jeff Bingaman)
  - Oversight of Government Management (Chair: William Cohen; Ranking Member: Carl Levin)
- Indian Affairs (Select) (Chair: Mark Andrews)
- Judiciary (Chair: Strom Thurmond; Ranking Member: Joe Biden)
  - Patents, Copyrights and Trademarks (Chair: Paul Laxalt; Ranking Member: Howard Metzenbaum)
  - Criminal Law (Chair: Paul Laxalt; Ranking Member: Joe Biden)
  - Constitution (Chair: Orrin Hatch; Ranking Member: Dennis DeConcini)
  - Courts (Chair: Bob Dole; Ranking Member: Howell Heflin)
  - Immigration and Refugee Policy (Chair: Alan Simpson; Ranking Member: Ted Kennedy)
  - Separation of Powers (Chair: John P. East; Ranking Member: Max Baucus)
  - Administration Practice and Procedure (Chair: Chuck Grassley; Ranking Member: Howell Heflin)
  - Security and Terrorism (Chair: Jeremiah Denton; Ranking Member: Howard Metzenbaum)
  - Juvenile Justice (Chair: Arlen Specter; Ranking Member: Howard Metzenbaum)
- Intelligence (Select) (Chair: Barry Goldwater; Ranking Member: Daniel Moynihan)
- Labor and Human Resources (Chair: Orrin Hatch; Ranking Member: Ted Kennedy)
  - Labor (Chair: Don Nickles; Ranking Member: Donald Riegle)
  - Education, Arts and Humanities (Chair: Robert Stafford; Ranking Member: Claiborne Pell)
  - Employment and Productivity (Chair: Dan Quayle; Ranking Member: Howard Metzenbaum)
  - Handicapped (Chair: Lowell Weicker; Ranking Member: Jennings Randolph)
  - Alcoholism and Drug Abuse (Chair: Gordon J. Humphrey; Ranking Member: Spark Matsunaga)
  - Aging (Chair: Chuck Grassley; Ranking Member: Thomas Eagleton)
  - Family and Human Services (Chair: Jeremiah Denton; Ranking Member: Chris Dodd)
- Nutrition and Human Needs (Select) (Chair: [data missing]; Ranking Member: [data missing])
- Rules and Administration (Chair: Charles Mathias; Ranking Member: Wendell Ford)
- Senate Committee System (Special) (Chair: [data missing]; Ranking Member: [data missing])
- Small Business (Chair: Lowell Weicker; Ranking Member: Sam Nunn)
  - Capital Formation and Detention (Chair: Bob Packwood; Ranking Member: Dale Bumpers)
  - Government Regulation and Paperwork (Chair: Orrin Hatch; Ranking Member: Walter Dee Huddleston)
  - Urban and Rural Economic Development (Chair: Al D'Amato; Ranking Member: Alan J. Dixon)
  - Government Procurement (Chair: Don Nickles; Ranking Member: Carl Levin)
  - Productivity and Competition (Chair: Slade Gorton; Ranking Member: Paul Tsongas)
  - Innovation and Technology (Chair: Warren Rudman; Ranking Member: Max Baucus)
  - Export Promotion and Market Development (Chair: Rudy Boschwitz; Ranking Member: Walter Dee Huddleston)
  - Small Business Family Farm (Chair: Larry Pressler; Ranking Member: Sam Nunn)
  - Entrepreneurship and Special Problems Facing Small Business (Chair: Bob Kasten; Ranking Member: David Boren)
- Veterans' Affairs (Chair: Alan Simpson; Ranking Member: Alan Cranston)
- Whole

=== House of Representatives ===
- Aging (Select) (Chair: Edward R. Roybal)
- Agriculture (Chair: Kika de la Garza; Ranking Member: Edward Madigan)
  - Cotton, Rice and Sugar (Chair: Jerry Huckaby; Ranking Member: Arlan Stangeland)
  - Livestock, Dairy and Poultry (Chair: Tom Harkin; Ranking Member: Jim Jeffords)
  - Tobacco and Peanuts (Chair: Charlie Rose; Ranking Member: Larry J. Hopkins)
  - Wheat, Soybeans and Feed Grains (Chair: Tom Foley; Ranking Member: Ron Marlenee)
  - Conservation Credit and Rural Development (Chair: Ed Jones; Ranking Member: Tom Coleman)
  - Department Operations Research and Foreign Agriculture (Chair: George Brown Jr.; Ranking Member: Pat Roberts)
  - Domestic Marketing, Consumer Relations and Nutrition (Chair: Leon Panetta; Ranking Member: Bill Emerson)
  - Forests, Family Farms and Energy (Chair: Charles Whitley; Ranking Member: George V. Hansen)
- Appropriations (Chair: Jamie Whitten; Ranking Member: Silvio O. Conte)
  - Agriculture, Rural Development and Related Agencies (Chair: Jamie Whitten; Ranking Member: Virginia Smith)
  - Commerce, Justice, State and the Judiciary (Chair: Neal Edward Smith; Ranking Member: George M. O'Brien)
  - Defense (Chair: Joseph P. Addabbo; Ranking Member: Jack Edwards)
  - District of Columbia (Chair: Julian Dixon; Ranking Member: Lawrence Coughlin)
  - Energy and Water Development (Chair: Tom Bevill; Ranking Member: John T. Myers)
  - Foreign Operations (Chair: Clarence Long; Ranking Member: Jack Kemp)
  - HUD-Independent Agencies (Chair: Edward Boland; Ranking Member: Bill Green)
  - Interior (Chair: Sidney R. Yates; Ranking Member: Joe Biden; Ranking Member: Joseph McDade)
  - Labor-Health and Human Services (Chair: William Natcher; Ranking Member: Silvio O. Conte)
  - Legislative (Chair: Vic Fazio; Ranking Member: Jerry Lewis)
  - Military Construction (Chair: Bill Hefner; Ranking Member: Ralph Regula)
  - Transportation (Chair: William Lehman; Ranking Member: Lawrence Coughlin)
  - Treasury, Postal Service and General Government (Chair: Edward Roybal; Ranking Member: Clarence E. Miller)
- Armed Services (Chair: Melvin Price; Ranking Member: William L. Dickinson)
  - Research and Development (Chair: Melvin Price; Ranking Member: William L. Dickinson)
  - Seapower, Strategic and Critical Materials (Chair: Charles Edward Bennett; Ranking Member: Floyd Spence)
  - Procurement and Military Nuclear Systems (Chair: Samuel S. Stratton; Ranking Member: Marjorie Holt)
  - Investigations (Chair: Bill Nichols; Ranking Member: Larry J. Hopkins)
  - Readiness (Chair: Dan Daniel; Ranking Member: G. William Whitehurst)
  - Military Personnel and Compensation (Chair: Les Aspin; Ranking Member: Elwood Hillis)
  - Military Installations and Facilities (Chair: Ron Dellums; Ranking Member: Ken Kramer)
- Banking, Finance and Urban Affairs (Chair: Fernand St Germain; Ranking Member: Chalmers Wylie)
  - Financial Institutions Supervision, Regulation and Insurance (Chair: Fernand St Germain; Ranking Member: Chalmers Wylie)
  - Housing and Community Development (Chair: Henry B. González; Ranking Member: Stewart McKinney)
  - General Oversight and Renegotiation (Chair: Joseph Minish; Ranking Member: Stanford Parris)
  - Consumer Affairs and Coinage (Chair: Frank Annunzio; Ranking Member: Ron Paul)
  - International Development Institutions and Finance (Chair: Jerry M. Patterson; Ranking Member: Doug Bereuter)
  - Domestic Monetary Policy (Chair: Walter Fauntroy; Ranking Member: George V. Hansen)
  - International Trade, Investment and Monetary Policy (Chair: Stephen L. Neal; Ranking Member: Jim Leach)
  - Economic Stabilization (Chair: John LaFalce; Ranking Member: Norman D. Shumway)
- Budget (Chair: James R. Jones; Ranking Member: Del Latta)
  - Capital Resources and Development (Chair: Tim Wirth; Ranking Member: Bobbi Fiedler)
  - Energy and Technology (Chair: Leon Panetta; Ranking Member: Tom Loeffler)
  - Budget Process (Chair: Leon Panetta; Ranking Member: Bud Shuster)
  - Education and Employment (Chair: Dick Gephardt; Ranking Member: Lynn Morley Martin)
  - Federalism/State-Local Relations (Chair: Bill Nelson; Ranking Member: Bill Frenzel)
  - Economic Policy and Growth (Chair: Les Aspin; Ranking Member: Ed Bethune)
  - Tax Policy (Chair: Thomas Downey; Ranking Member: Jack Kemp)
  - Entitlements, Uncontrollables and Indexing (Chair: Brian J. Donnelly; Ranking Member: Phil Gramm)
  - International Finance and Trade (Chair: Mike Lowry; Ranking Member: Bill Frenzel)
- Children, Youth and Families (Select) (Chair: George Miller)
- District of Columbia (Chair: Ron Dellums; Ranking Member: Stewart McKinney)
  - Fiscal Affairs and Health (Chair: Walter Fauntroy; Ranking Member: Marjorie Holt)
  - Government Operations and Metropolitan Affairs (Chair: William H. Gray III; Ranking Member: Stanford Parris)
  - Judiciary and Education (Chair: Mervyn Dymally; Ranking Member: Thomas J. Bliley Jr.)
- Education and Labor (Chair: Carl D. Perkins, then Augustus Hawkins; Ranking Member: John N. Erlenborn)
  - Elementary, Secondary and Vocational Education (Chair: Carl D. Perkins; Ranking Member: Bill Goodling)
  - Employment Opportunities (Chair: Augustus Hawkins; Ranking Member: Jim Jeffords)
  - Labor-Management Relations (Chair: Phillip Burton; Ranking Member: Marge Roukema)
  - Health and Safety (Chair: Joseph M. Gaydos; Ranking Member: Steve Gunderson)
  - Human Resources (Chair: Ike Franklin Andrews; Ranking Member: Tom Petri)
  - Postsecondary Education (Chair: Paul Simon; Ranking Member: Tom Coleman)
  - Labor Standards (Chair: George Miller; Ranking Member: John N. Erlenborn)
  - Select Education (Chair: Austin J. Murphy; Ranking Member: Steve Bartlett)
- Energy and Commerce (Chair: John Dingell; Ranking Member: Jim Broyhill)
  - Oversight and Investigations (Chair: John Dingell; Ranking Member: Jim Broyhill)
  - Energy Conservation and Power (Chair: Richard Ottinger; Ranking Member: Carlos Moorhead)
  - Health and the Environment (Chair: Henry Waxman; Ranking Member: Edward Madigan)
  - Telecommunications, Consumer Protection and Finance (Chair: Tim Wirth; Ranking Member: Matthew J. Rinaldo)
  - Fossil and Synthetic Fuels (Chair: Philip Sharp; Ranking Member: Tom Corcoran)
  - Commerce, Transportation and Tourism (Chair: James Florio; Ranking Member: Norman F. Lent)
- Foreign Affairs (Chair: Clement Zablocki, then Dante Fascell; Ranking Member: William Broomfield)
  - International Security and Scientific Affairs (Chair: Clement Zablocki; Ranking Member: William Broomfield)
  - International Operations (Chair: Dante Fascell; Ranking Member: Benjamin A. Gilman)
  - Europe and the Middle East (Chair: Lee Hamilton; Ranking Member: Larry Winn)
  - Human Rights and International Organizations (Chair: Gus Yatron; Ranking Member: Jim Leach)
  - Asian and Pacific Affairs (Chair: Stephen Solarz; Ranking Member: Joel Pritchard)
  - International Economic Policy and Trade (Chair: Don Bonker; Ranking Member: Toby Roth)
  - Western Hemisphere Affairs (Chair: Michael D. Barnes; Ranking Member: Robert Lagomarsino)
  - Africa (Chair: Howard Wolpe; Ranking Member: Gerald Solomon)
- Government Operations (Chair: Jack Brooks; Ranking Member: Frank Horton)
  - Legislation and National Security (Chair: Jack Brooks; Ranking Member: Frank Horton)
  - Government Activities and Transportation (Chair: Cardiss Collins; Ranking Member: Raymond J. McGrath)
  - Government Information and Individual Rights (Chair: Glenn English; Ranking Member: Tom Kindness)
  - Ingovernmental Relations and Human Resources (Chair: Ted Weiss; Ranking Member: Robert S. Walker)
  - Environment, Energy and Natural Resources (Chair: Mike Synar; Ranking Member: Lyle Williams)
  - Commerce, Consumer and Monetary Affairs (Chair: Doug Barnard Jr.; Ranking Member: Judd Gregg)
  - Manpower and Housing (Chair: Barney Frank; Ranking Member: John R. McKernan Jr.)
- House Administration (Chair: Augustus Hawkins, then Frank Annunzio; Ranking Member: Bill Frenzel)
  - Accounts (Chair: Frank Annunzio; Ranking Member: Robert Badham)
  - Contracts and Printing (Chair: Joseph M. Gaydos; Ranking Member: Newt Gingrich)
  - Services (Chair: Ed Jones; Ranking Member: William L. Dickinson)
  - Office Systems (Chair: Charlie Rose; Ranking Member: Bill Thomas)
  - Personnel and Police (Chair: Joseph Minish; Ranking Member: Rod Chandler)
- Interior and Insular Affairs (Chair: Mo Udall; Ranking Member: Manuel Lujan Jr.)
  - Energy and the Environment (Chair: Mo Udall; Ranking Member: Manuel Lujan Jr.)
  - Water and Power Resources (Chair: Abraham Kazen; Ranking Member: Dick Cheney)
  - Public Lands and National Lands (Chair: John F. Seiberling; Ranking Member: Don Young)
  - Insular Affairs (Chair: Antonio Borja Won Pat; Ranking Member: Robert Lagomarsino)
  - Mining, Forest Management and Bonneville Power Administration (Chair: Jim Weaver; Ranking Member: Dan Marriott)
  - Oversight and Investigations (Chair: Ed Markey; Ranking Member: Ron Marlenee)
- Judiciary (Chair: Peter W. Rodino; Ranking Member: Hamilton Fish IV)
  - Immigration (Chair: Romano L. Mazzoli; Ranking Member: Dan Lungren)
  - Courts (Chair: Robert Kastenmeier; Ranking Member: Carlos Moorhead)
  - Monopolies (Chair: Peter W. Rodino; Ranking Member: Hamilton Fish IV)
  - Administrative Law (Chair: Sam B. Hall Jr.; Ranking Member: Tom Kindness)
  - Civil and Constitutional Rights (Chair: Don Edwards; Ranking Member: James Sensenbrenner)
  - Crime (Chair: William J. Hughes; Ranking Member: Harold Sawyer)
  - Criminal Justice (Chair: John Conyers Jr.; Ranking Member: George W. Gekas)
- Merchant Marine and Fisheries (Chair: Walter B. Jones Sr.; Ranking Member: Edwin B. Forsythe)
  - Merchant Marine (Chair: Mario Biaggi; Ranking Member: Gene Snyder)
  - Fisheries, Wildlife Conservation and the Environment (Chair: John Breaux; Ranking Member: Edwin B. Forsythe)
  - Coast Guard and Navigation (Chair: Gerry Studds; Ranking Member: Don Young)
  - Panama Canal and Outer Continental Stuff (Chair: Carroll Hubbard; Ranking Member: William Carney)
  - Oceanography (Chair: Norman D'Amours; Ranking Member: Joel Pritchard)
- Narcotics Abuse and Control (Select) (Chair: Charles Rangel)
- Post Office and Civil Service (Chair: Jack Brooks; Ranking Member: Gene Taylor)
  - Investigations (Chair: William D. Ford; Ranking Member: Gene Taylor)
  - Postal Operations and Services (Chair: Bill Clay; Ranking Member: Tom Corcoran)
  - Civil Service (Chair: Patricia Schroeder; Ranking Member: Chip Pashayan)
  - Census and Population (Chair: Robert Garcia; Ranking Member: Jim Courter)
  - Postal Personnel and Modernization (Chair: Mickey Leland; Ranking Member: Frank Wolf)
  - Compensation and Employee Benefits (Chair: Mary Rose Oakar; Ranking Member: William Dannemeyer)
  - Human Resources (Chair: Donald J. Albosta; Ranking Member: Dan Crane)
- Public Works and Transportation (Chair: James J. Howard; Ranking Member: Gene Snyder)
  - Aviation (Chair: Norman Y. Mineta; Ranking Member: John Paul Hammerschmidt)
  - Economic Development (Chair: Jim Oberstar; Ranking Member: William Clinger)
  - Investigations and Oversight (Chair: Elliott H. Levitas; Ranking Member: Guy Molinari)
  - Public Buildings and Grounds (Chair: Robert A. Young; Ranking Member: Clay Shaw)
  - Surface Transportation (Chair: Glenn M. Anderson; Ranking Member: Bud Shuster)
  - Water Resources (Chair: Robert A. Roe; Ranking Member: Arlan Stangeland)
- Rules (Chair: Claude Pepper; Ranking Member: Jimmy Quillen)
  - The Legislative Process (Chair: Gillis William Long; Ranking Member: Trent Lott)
  - Rules of the House (Chair: Joe Moakley; Ranking Member: Gene Taylor)
- Science and Technology (Chair: Don Fuqua; Ranking Member: Larry Winn)
  - Energy Development and Applications (Chair: Don Fuqua; Ranking Member: James Sensenbrenner)
  - Natural Resources, Agriculture Research and Environment (Chair: James H. Scheuer; Ranking Member: Bob Walker)
  - Energy Research and Production (Chair: Marilyn Lloyd; Ranking Member: Bob Walker)
  - Science, Research and Technology (Chair: Doug Walgren; Ranking Member: Judd Gregg)
  - Transportation, Aviation and Materials (Chair: Dan Glickman; Ranking Member: William Carney)
  - Investigations and Oversight (Chair: Al Gore; Ranking Member: Joe Skeen)
  - Space Science and Applications (Chair: Harold Volkmer; Ranking Member: Manuel Lujan Jr.)
- Small Business (Chair: Parren Mitchell; Ranking Member: Joseph McDade)
  - SBA and SBIC Authority, Minority Enterprise and General Small Business Problems (Chair: Parren Mitchell; Ranking Member: Joseph McDade)
  - General Oversight and the Economy (Chair: Berkley Bedell; Ranking Member: Silvio O. Conte)
  - Antitrust and Restraint of Trade Activities affecting Small Business (Chair: Tom Luken; Ranking Member: Vin Weber)
  - Energy, Environment and Safety Issues affecting Small Business (Chair: Ike Skelton; Ranking Member: John P. Hiler)
  - Tax, Access to Equity Capital and Business Opportunities (Chair: Henry J. Nowak; Ranking Member: Lyle Williams)
  - Export Opportunities and Special Small Business Problems (Chair: Andy Ireland; Ranking Member: William S. Broomfield)
- Standards of Official Conduct (Chair: Louis Stokes; Ranking Member: Floyd Spence)
- Veterans' Affairs (Chair: Sonny Montgomery; Ranking Member: John Paul Hammerschmidt)
  - Oversight and Investigations (Chair: Sonny Montgomery; Ranking Member: Elwood Hillis)
  - Hospitals and Health Care (Chair: Bob Edgar; Ranking Member: John Paul Hammerschmidt)
  - Education, Training and Employment (Chair: Marvin Leath; Ranking Member: Gerald Solomon)
  - Compensation, Pension and Insurance (Chair: Douglas Applegate; Ranking Member: Bob McEwen)
  - Housing and Memorial Affairs (Chair: Richard Shelby; Ranking Member: Chris Smith)
- Ways and Means (Chair: Dan Rostenkowski; Ranking Member: Barber Conable)
  - Trade (Chair: Sam Gibbons; Ranking Member: Guy Vander Jagt)
  - Social Security (Chair: J.J. Pickle; Ranking Member: Bill Archer)
  - Oversight (Chair: Charles Rangel; Ranking Member: James G. Martin)
  - Select Revenue Measures (Chair: Pete Stark; Ranking Member: John J. Duncan)
  - Health (Chair: Andrew Jacobs Jr.; Ranking Member: Henson Moore)
  - Public Assistance and Unemployment Compensation (Chair: Harold Ford Jr.; Ranking Member: Carroll Campbell Jr.)
- Whole

=== Joint committees ===
- Economic (Chair: Sen. Roger Jepsen; Vice Chair: Rep. Lee Hamilton)
- Taxation (Chair: Rep. Dan Rostenkowski; Vice Chair: Sen. Bob Dole)
- The Library (Chair: Sen. Charles Mathias; Vice Chair: Rep. Augustus Hawkins)
- Printing (Chair: Rep. Augustus Hawkins; Vice Chair: Sen. Charles Mathias)

== Employees ==
=== Legislative branch agency directors ===
- Architect of the Capitol: George Malcolm White
- Attending Physician of the United States Congress: Freeman H. Cary
- Comptroller General of the United States: Charles A. Bowsher
- Director of the Congressional Budget Office: Alice M. Rivlin, until August 31, 1983
  - Rudolph G. Penner, from September 1, 1983
- Librarian of Congress: Daniel J. Boorstin
- Public Printer of the United States: Danford L. Sawyer Jr., until 1984
  - Ralph E. Kennickell Jr., from 1984

=== Senate ===
- Chaplain: Richard C. Halverson (Presbyterian)
- Curator: James R. Ketchum
- Historian: Richard A. Baker
- Parliamentarian: Bob Dove
- Secretary: William Hildenbrand
- Librarian: Roger K. Haley
- Secretary for the Majority: Howard O. Greene Jr.
- Secretary for the Minority: Patrick J. Griffin
- Sergeant at Arms: Howard S. Liebengood, until September 13, 1983
  - Larry E. Smith, from September 13, 1983

=== House of Representatives ===
- Chaplain: James D. Ford (Lutheran)
- Clerk: Benjamin J. Guthrie
- Doorkeeper: James T. Molloy
- Historian: Ray Smock, from 1983
- Parliamentarian: William H. Brown
- Reading Clerks: Meg Goetz (D) and Bob Berry (R)
- Postmaster: Robert V. Rota
- Sergeant at Arms: Jack Russ

== See also ==
- List of new members of the 98th United States Congress
- 1982 United States elections (elections leading to this Congress)
  - 1982 United States Senate elections
  - 1982 United States House of Representatives elections
- 1984 United States elections (elections during this Congress, leading to the next Congress)
  - 1984 United States presidential election
  - 1984 United States Senate elections
  - 1984 United States House of Representatives elections
