= Shipping Act of 1984 =

United States federal law

- Long title: An Act to improve the international ocean commerce transportation system of the United States.
- Nicknames: Shipping Act of 1983
- Enacted by: the 98th United States Congress
- Effective: March 20, 1984

Citations
- Public law: 98-237
- Statutes at Large: 98 Stat. 67

Codification
- Titles amended: 46 U.S.C.: Shipping

Legislative history
- Introduced in the Senate as S. 47 by Slade Gorton (R–WA) on January 26, 1983; Committee consideration by Senate Commerce, Science, and Transportation; Passed the Senate on March 1, 1983 (64-33); Passed the House on October 17, 1983 (Passed voice vote); Reported by the joint conference committee on February 22, 1984; agreed to by the Senate on February 23, 1984 (74-12) and by the House on March 6, 1984 (Agreed voice vote); Signed into law by President Ronald W. Reagan on March 20, 1984

The U.S. Shipping Act, was signed into law by President Ronald Reagan on March 20, 1984. The purpose of the Act was to: (1) establish a nondiscriminatory regulatory process for the common carriage of goods by water in the foreign commerce of the United States with a minimum of government intervention and regulatory costs; (2) provide an efficient and economic transportation system in the ocean commerce of the United States that is, insofar as possible, in harmony with, and responsive to, international shipping practices; (3) encourage the development of an economically sound and efficient liner fleet of vessels of the United States capable of meeting national security needs; and (4) promote the growth and development of United States exports through competitive and efficient ocean transportation and by placing a greater reliance on the marketplace.

== Amendment to 1984 Act ==
The Shipping Act was amended with the enactment of the Ocean Shipping Reform Act of 1998. The 105th United States Congress passed Senate bill 414 being enacted into law by Bill Clinton on October 14, 1998.
