= Semiconductor Chip Protection Act of 1984 =

United States intellectual property law

- Other short titles: State Justice Institute Act of 1984; Technical Amendments to the Federal Courts Improvement Act of 1982; Trademark Clarification Act of 1984
- Long title: An act to amend title 28, United States Code, with respect to the places where court shall be held in certain judicial districts, and for other purposes.
- Acronyms (colloquial): SCPA
- Nicknames: Federal District Court Organization Act of 1984
- Enacted by: the 98th United States Congress
- Effective: November 8, 1984

Citations
- Public law: 98–620
- Statutes at Large: 98 Stat. 3335 aka 98 Stat. 3347

Codification
- Acts amended: Trademark Act of 1946
- Titles amended: 15 U.S.C.: Commerce and Trade; 17 U.S.C.: Copyrights
- U.S.C. sections created: 17 U.S.C. ch. 9 § 901 et seq.
- U.S.C. sections amended: 15 U.S.C. ch. 22 § 1051 et seq.

Legislative history
- Introduced in the House as H.R. 6163 by Robert Kastenmeier (D-WI) on August 10, 1984; Committee consideration by House Judiciary, Senate Judiciary; Passed the House on September 24, 1984 (passed voice vote); Passed the Senate on October 3, 1984 (passed voice vote) with amendment; House agreed to Senate amendment on October 9, 1984 (363-0); Signed into law by President Ronald Reagan on November 8, 1984

The Semiconductor Chip Protection Act of 1984 (or SCPA) is an act of the US Congress that makes the layouts of integrated circuits legally protected upon registration, and hence illegal to copy without permission. It is an integrated circuit layout design protection law.

== Background ==
Prior to 1984, it was not necessarily illegal to produce a competing chip with an identical layout. As the legislative history for the SCPA explained, patent and copyright protection for chip layouts, chip topographies, was largely unavailable. This led to considerable complaint by American chip manufacturers—notably, Intel, which, along with the Semiconductor Industry Association (SIA), took the lead in seeking remedial legislation—against what they termed "chip piracy." During the hearings that led to enactment of the SCPA, chip industry representatives asserted that a pirate could copy a chip design for $100,000 in 3 to 5 months that had cost its original manufacturer upwards of $1 million to design.

== Enactment of US and other national legislation ==
In 1984 the United States enacted the Semiconductor Chip Protection Act of 1984 (the SCPA) to protect the topography of semiconductor chips. The SCPA is found in title 17, U.S. Code, sections 901-914 (17 U.S.C. §§ 901-914).

Japan and European Community (EC) countries soon followed suit and enacted their own, similar laws protecting the topography of semiconductor chips.

Chip topographies are also protected by TRIPS, an international treaty.

== How the SCPA operates ==
=== Sui generis law ===
Although the U.S. SCPA is codified in title 17 (copyrights), the SCPA is not a copyright or patent law. Rather, it is a sui generis law resembling a utility model law or Gebrauchsmuster. It has some aspects of copyright law, some aspects of patent law, and in some ways, it is completely different from either. From Brooktree, ¶ 23:

The Semiconductor Chip Protection Act of 1984 was an innovative solution to this new problem of technology-based industry. While some copyright principles underlie the law, as do some attributes of patent law, the Act was uniquely adapted to semiconductor mask works, in order to achieve appropriate protection for original designs while meeting the competitive needs of the industry and serving the public interest.

In general, the chip topography laws of other nations are also sui generis laws. Nevertheless, copyright and patent case law illuminate many aspects of the SCPA and its interpretation.

=== Acquisition of protection by registration ===
Chip protection is acquired under the SCPA by filing with the US Copyright Office an application for "mask work" registration under the SCPA, together with a filing fee. The application must be accompanied by identifying material, such as pictorial representations of the IC layers so that in the event of infringement litigation, it can be determined what the registration covers. Protection continues for ten years from the date of registration.

=== Mask works ===
The SCPA repeatedly refers to "mask works." The term is a relic of the original form of the bill that became the SCPA and was passed in the Senate as an amendment to the Copyright Act. The term mask work is parallel to and consistent with the terminology of the 1976 Copyright Act, which introduced the concept of "literary works," "pictorial works," "audiovisual works," and the like and protected physical embodiments of such works, such as books, paintings, video game cassettes, and the like against unauthorized copying and distribution. The terminology became unnecessary when the House of Representatives insisted on the substitution of a sui generis bill, but the SCPA as enacted still continued its use. The term "mask work" is not limited to actual masks used in chip manufacture but is defined broadly in the SCPA to include the topographic creation embodied in the masks and chips. Moreover, the SCPA protects any physical embodiment of a mask work.

=== Enforcement ===
The owner of mask work rights may pursue an alleged infringer ("chip pirate") by bringing an action for mask work infringement in federal district court. The remedies available correspond generally to those of copyright law and patent law.

=== Functionality unprotected ===
The SCPA does not protect functional aspects of chip designs, which is reserved to patent law. Although EPROM and other memory chips topographies are protectable under the SCPA, such protection does not extend to the information stored in chips, such as computer programs. Such information is protected, if at all, only by copyright law.

=== Reverse engineering allowed ===
The SCPA permits competitive emulation of a chip by means of reverse engineering. The ordinary test for illegal copying (mask work infringement) is the "substantial similarity" test of copyright law, but when the defense of reverse engineering is involved and supported by probative evidence (usually, the so-called paper trail of design and development work), the similarity must be greater. Then, the accused chip topography must be substantially identical (truly copied by rote, so-called slavish copying) rather than just substantially similar for the defendant to be liable for infringement. Most world chip topography protection laws provide for a reverse engineering privilege.

== See also ==
- Integrated circuit layout design protection
- Chip art – prior to the Semiconductor Chip Protection Act, the presence of chip art (non-functional images) was used to establish that a chip was a rote copy, not reverse engineered.
