= Extra-Long Staple Cotton Act of 1983 =

Extra Long Staple Cotton Act of 1983
- Long title: An Act to establish an improved program for extra long staple cotton.
- Enacted by: the 98th United States Congress
- Effective: August 26, 1983

Citations
- Public law: 98-88
- Statutes at Large: 97 Stat. 494

Codification
- Acts amended: Agricultural Act of 1949; Agriculture and Food Act of 1981
- Titles amended: 7 U.S.C.: Agriculture
- U.S.C. sections amended: 7 U.S.C. ch. 35A § 1421 et seq.; 7 U.S.C. ch. 35 § 1342 et seq.

Legislative history
- Introduced in the House as H.R. 3190 by Eligio de la Garza, II (D–TX) on June 2, 1983; Committee consideration by House Agriculture, Senate Agriculture, Nutrition, and Forestry; Passed the House on June 27, 1983 (passed voice vote); Passed the Senate on August 4, 1983 (passed voice vote); Signed into law by President Ronald Reagan on August 26, 1983

The Extra-Long Staple Cotton Act of 1983 (P.L. 98–88) eliminated marketing quotas and allotments for extra-long staple cotton and tied its support to upland cotton through a formula that set the nonrecourse loan rate at not less than 150% of the upland cotton loan level. The act amended the Agricultural Act of 1949 to set forth new Extra-Long Staple cotton program provisions and Agriculture and Food Act of 1981 to add Extra-Long Staple cotton to the $50,000 payment limitation for the payments which a person received under commodity programs. The act was sponsored by Kika de la Garza.
