= Voting Accessibility for the Elderly and Handicapped Act =

1984 United States law

The Voting Accessibility for the Elderly and Handicapped Act (VAEHA) P.L. 98-435, 42 U.S.C. §§ 1973ee–1973ee-6, is a United States law passed in 1984 that mandates easy access for handicapped and elderly persons to voter registration and polling places during federal elections. The law also mandates registration and voting aids, such as printing instructions in large font.

== Purpose ==
The law requires that all polling facilities must be accessible to all individuals with disabilities. The act states that if "no accessible location is available to serve as a polling place; voters must provide an alternate means of voting on Election Day" The Attorney General of the United States is charged with the responsibility of enforcing the VAEHA

If an election facility cannot implement change on these requirements, they must provide alternate options before voting on Election Day.

This circumstance was brought into question and debate through many cases concerning unequal disadvantages when it came to voting rights for those who have physical, mental and social restrictions; Shelby County vs. Holder (a case revolving around constitutionality and discrimination within voting laws and policies). Much of the evidence came from treatment towards these groups at voting facilities. These restrictions that enabled the victims had to do with accessibility conflicts. This included, parking, entrances, pedestrian routes within and outside the polling area, and check ins.

== Voting Act Terminology ==
- Elderly: 65 years or older.
- Handicapped: temporary or permanent disability.
- Disability: a physical, mental or social condition that restricts someone's movements and sensory behaviors.
- Accessibility: the standard of something that can be being easy to obtain or use; being understood and respected.
- Accommodate: to fulfill one's wants and needs.
- Aid: to help, assist, or support; physically or emotionally.
- Absentee vote: a vote sent by mail or online instead of voting in person.
- Violate: to break a formal rule or failing to follow and abide by it.

== Registration and Voting Aids ==
Under the VAEHA, each state must provide

- accessibility to registration and voting aids for disabled persons.
- ballots be printed in large print font.
- access to aids including telecommunication devices for the deaf (TDD).

A state cannot require a medical certification or doctor documentation for the casting of an absentee ballot due to disability factors. The chief officer of each state will provide ample notice and detailed information to those experiencing disabilities concerning the availability of specific aids needed on election day.

In 2015, an amendment was added to the VAEHA stating that a polling official "may allow a voter who is physically disabled or over the age of 70 to move to the front of the line at polling place upon request of the voter".

In Massachusetts, if a voter has a disability that prevents the ability to mark a paper ballot, and prefer to mark the ballot independently from home, the voter may vote using the Accessible Vote by Mail system.

== Selection of Polling Facilities ==
Under the VAEHA, each state is responsible for:

- adhering to the guidelines laid out for physical accessibility for those experiencing any type of disability.
- providing disabled patrons assigned to a facility without accessibility with an alternative location for the ballot casting purposes on the day of the election.
- providing ample notice on the dispersion of documentation in a timely manner.

The chief official of each state will determine each potential polling location. The location itself will be surveyed beforehand. If no such accessible place is available that particular political location must provide temporary accessibility to that specific personnel. The assignment report from each state must be completed by "no later than December 31 of each even-numbered year, the chief election officer of each state shall report to the Federal Election Commission" to determine both the accessibility and inaccessibility of polling places. This information must be submitted and reported to Congress by April 30 of each odd-numbered years.

== Selection of Registration Facilities ==
Under the VAEHA, "every state or political subdivision responsible for registration for federal elections shall provide a reasonable number of accessible permanent registration facilities".

This does not apply to any state that already provides ample opportunities for potential or registered voters within federal regulated facilities.

== Enforcement: (including violations) ==
Under the VAEHA, anyone who believe that a state's election officials might have violated the Voting Accessibility Act can bring this information to the attention of the federal district court. Therefore, would be given an appropriate notification of time concerning the severity of violation itself. Section 6 of the 42 USC 1973 ee-4 states that "an action may be brought under this section only if the plaintiff notices the chief election officer of the state of the non compliance and a period of 45 days has elapsed since the date of notification." "Notwithstanding any other provision of the law, no award if attorney fees may be made with respect to an action under this section, expect in any action brought to enforce the original judgement of the court".

== Attempted Amendments ==
In 1999, Senator John McCain of Arizona introduced S.511 in order to update the VAEHA. The amendment hoped to specify certain polling regulations and permit voter registration/poll registration to be done in the voter's home.

McCain also wanted to make sure antiquated language was no longer used and replace every use of "handicapped" with the word "disabled". He hoped to modernize other definitions as well add the word "Access Board" to the document—which would essentially allow the Architectural and Transportation Barriers Compliance Board to be in charge of the rules and regulations surrounding the polling places.

== Current Events ==
Despite the passing of The VAEHA people with disabilities have reported several inaccessibility problems.

During the 2012 presidential election, voters reported the following problems:

- In Arizona, some voters could not vote privately because poll workers were not knowledgeable in using the accessible equipment provided. Also, one of the Arizona voters "reported that when he or she ‘asked to use the accessible voting equipment, they were told no, they did not need’".
- In Illinois, a poll worker told a voter that they were not allowed to have an assistant aid them in voting because they did not look like they had a disability.
- In Michigan, a poll worker questioned a voter’s right to vote because they had a physical disability of being non-verbal.
- In Missouri and Tennessee, there were inaccessible polling places. ,

The U.S. Government Accountability Office did a study on the accessibility of polling places. They examined both the inside and outside areas of the polling places during the 2016 election. After examining a sample of "178 polling places" their results showed that "60 percent (107) had one or more potential impediments. The most common were steep ramps located outside buildings, lack of signs indicating accessible paths, and poor parking or path surfaces". These results consist of both studies during the 2016 Election Day and early-in-person voting.

The Department of Justice's (DOJ) guidance is also not explicit on the extent "to which certain federal accessibility requirements are applicable to early in-person voting, an increasingly common form of voting at a designated location before Election Day".

In March 2021, the state of Georgia introduced voting measures that could make voting harder, especially for those with disabilities. Limitations include limited access to drop boxes. Drop boxes provide a convenient way to drop ballots for those who may have difficult accessing ballot centers. Disability activists have urged Congress to pass the John Lewis Voting Rights Advancement Act in order to protect voter's rights.

== Future Reference ==
The National Voter Registration Act of 1993 (NVRA) provides assistance at the public and state level for all registered voters with disabilities. The Help America Vote Act of 2002 outlines that all federal funded elections must provide at least one form of accessibility voting for all persons with disabilities.

== Website External links ==
- The Americans with Disabilities Act and Other Federal Law Protecting the Rights of Voters with Disabilities- https://www.ada.gov/ada_voting/ada_voting_ta.htm
- Chapter 201- Voting Accessibility for the Elderly and Handicapped- http://uscode.house.gov/view.xhtml?path=/prelim@title52/subtitle2/chapter201&edition=prelim
- H.R. 1250 (98th): Voting Accessibility for the Elderly and Handicapped Act- https://www.govtrack.us/congress/bills/98/hr1250
- "Voting Accessibility". U.S. Election Assistance Commission. 2022. Archived from the original on June 25, 2022.

== Journal Publications ==
- LaFratta, B. K., & Lake, J. (2001). Inside the Voting Booth: Ensuring the Intent of the Elderly Voter. Elder LJ, 9, 141.- https://heinonline.org/HOL/Page?handle=hein.journals/elder9&div=11&g_sent=1&casa_token=
- Pfeiffer, D. (1993). Overview of the disability movement: History, legislative record, and political implications. Policy Studies Journal, 21(4), 724–734. doi:10.1111/j.1541-0072.1993.tb02169.x
- Schriner, K., & Batavia, A. I. (2001). The Americans With Disabilities Act: Does it secure the fundamental right to vote?. Policy Studies Journal, 29(4), 663–673.
- Weicker Jr, L. P. (1991). Historical background of the Americans with Disabilities Act. Temp. LR, 64, 387.
- Weis, C. J. (2004). Why the Help America Vote Act fails to help disabled Americans vote. NYUJ Legis. & Pub. Pol'y, 8, 421.
