= Integrated Circuit Topography Act =

Canadian intellectual property statute

Parliament of Canada
- Long title: An Act to provide for the protection of integrated circuit topographies and to amend certain Acts in consequence thereof
- Citation: S.C. 1990, c. 37
- Royal assent: June 27, 1990
- Commenced: 1993

The Integrated Circuit Topography Act (French: Loi sur les topographies de circuits intégrés, C-37) is legislation passed by the Parliament of Canada in 1990 that regulates the intellectual property of integrated circuit topographies. It came into force in 1993. The Act provides exclusive rights for the creator of the integrated circuit topography and remedies to deter infringement. The exclusive right is transferable. To receive the exclusive right to an integrated circuit topography the topography must be registered at the Canadian Intellectual Property Office. Between 1993 and 1999 there were about 38 registrations under the Act.

Integrated Circuit Topographies (ICT) are electronic integrated circuits or IC products that are configured and interconnected. These creations are protected in Canada by the Integrated Circuit Topography Act, which gives the creator exclusive rights for a period of ten years after registration. Because products containing these circuits are often exported outside Canada, Canada has reciprocal agreements with other countries that also protect the design for ten years.
