= Integrated circuit layout design protection =

IP protections for computer hardware

Layout designs (topographies) of integrated circuits are a field in the protection of intellectual property.

In United States intellectual property law, a "mask work" is a two or three-dimensional layout or topography of an integrated circuit (IC or "chip"), i.e. the arrangement on a chip of semiconductor devices such as transistors and passive electronic components such as resistors and interconnections. The layout is called a mask work because, in photolithographic processes, the multiple etched layers within actual ICs are each created using a mask, called the photomask, to permit or block light at specific locations, sometimes for hundreds of chips on a wafer simultaneously.

Because of the functional nature of the mask geometry, the designs cannot be effectively protected under copyright law (except perhaps as decorative art). Similarly, because individual lithographic mask works are not clearly protectable subject matter; they also cannot be effectively protected under patent law, although any processes implemented in the work may be patentable. So since the 1990s, national governments have been granting copyright-like exclusive rights conferring time-limited exclusivity to reproduction of a particular layout. Terms of integrated circuit rights are usually shorter than copyrights applicable on pictures.

== International law ==
A diplomatic conference was held at Washington, D.C., in 1989, which adopted a Treaty on Intellectual Property in Respect of Integrated Circuits, also called the Washington Treaty or IPIC Treaty. The Treaty, signed at Washington on May 26, 1989, is open to member states of the United Nations (UN) World Intellectual Property Organization (WIPO) and to intergovernmental organizations meeting certain criteria. The Treaty has been incorporated by reference into the TRIPS Agreement of the World Trade Organization (WTO), subject to the following modifications: the term of protection is at least 10 (rather than eight) years from the date of filing an application or of the first commercial exploitation in the world, but Members may provide a term of protection of 15 years from the creation of the layout-design; the exclusive right of the right-holder extends also to articles incorporating integrated circuits in which a protected layout-design is incorporated, in so far as it continues to contain an unlawfully reproduced layout-design; the circumstances in which layout-designs may be used without the consent of right-holders are more restricted; certain acts engaged in unknowingly will not constitute infringement.

The IPIC Treaty is currently not in force, but was partially integrated into the TRIPS agreement.

Article 35 of TRIPS in Relation to the IPIC Treaty states:

Members agree to provide protection to the layout-designs (topographies) of integrated circuits (referred to in this Agreement as "layout-designs") in accordance with Articles 2 through 7 (other than paragraph 3 of Article 6), Article 12 and paragraph 3 of Article 16 of the Treaty on Intellectual Property in Respect of Integrated Circuits and, in addition, to comply with the following provisions.

Article 2 of the IPIC Treaty gives the following definitions:

(i) 'integrated circuit' means a product, in its final form or an intermediate form, in which the elements, at least one of which is an active element, and some or all of the inter-connections are integrally formed in and/or on a piece of material and which is intended to perform an electronic function,

(ii) 'layout-design (topography)' means the three-dimensional disposition, however expressed, of the elements, at least one of which is an active element, and of some or all of the interconnections of an integrated circuit, or such a three-dimensional disposition prepared for an integrated circuit intended for manufacture ...

Under the IPIC Treaty, each Contracting Party is obliged to secure, throughout its territory, exclusive rights in layout-designs (topographies) of integrated circuits, whether or not the integrated circuit concerned is incorporated in an article. Such obligation applies to layout-designs that are original in the sense that they are the result of their creators' own intellectual effort and are not commonplace among creators of layout designs and manufacturers of integrated circuits at the time of their creation.

The Contracting Parties must, as a minimum, consider the following acts to be unlawful if performed without the authorization of the holder of the right: the reproduction of the lay-out design, and the importation, sale or other distribution for commercial purposes of the layout-design or an integrated circuit in which the layout-design is incorporated. However, certain acts may be freely performed for private purposes or for the sole purpose of evaluation, analysis, research or teaching.

== National laws ==
=== United States ===
The United States Code (USC) defines a mask work as "a series of related images, however fixed or encoded, having or representing the predetermined, three-dimensional pattern of metallic, insulating, or semiconductor material present or removed from the layers of a semiconductor chip product, and in which the relation of the images to one another is such that each image has the pattern of the surface of one form of the semiconductor chip product" [(17 U.S.C. § 901(a)(2))]. Mask work exclusive rights were first granted in the US by the Semiconductor Chip Protection Act of 1984.

According to 17 U.S.C. § 904, rights in semiconductor mask works last 10 years. This contrasts with a term of 95 years for modern copyrighted works with a corporate authorship; alleged infringement of mask work rights are also not protected by a statutory fair use defense, nor by the typical backup copy exemptions that 17 U.S.C. § 117 provides for computer software. Nevertheless, as fair use in copyrighted works was originally recognized by the judiciary over a century before being codified in the Copyright Act of 1976, it is possible that the courts might likewise find a similar defense applies to mask work.

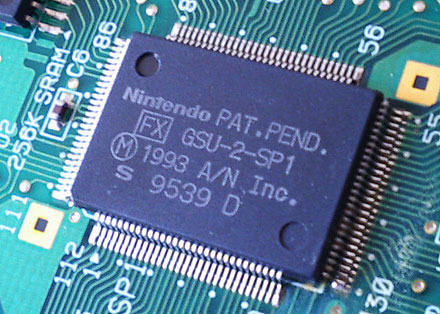
A Super FX chip with the encircled M symbol next to release year and manufacturer name

The non-obligatory symbol used in a mask work protection notice is Ⓜ (M enclosed in a circle; Unicode code point U+24C2/U+1F1AD or HTML numeric character entity &#9410;/&#127405;) or *M*.

The exclusive rights in a mask work are somewhat like those of copyright: the right to reproduce the mask work or (initially) distribute an IC made using the mask work. Like the first sale doctrine, a lawful owner of an authorized IC containing a mask work may freely import, distribute or use, but not reproduce the chip (or the mask). Mask work protection is characterized as a sui generis right, i.e., one created to protect specific rights where other (more general) laws were inadequate or inappropriate.

Note that the exclusive rights granted to mask work owners are more limited than those granted to copyright or patent holders. For instance, modification (derivative works) is not an exclusive right of mask work owners. Similarly, the exclusive right of a patentee to "use" an invention would not prohibit an independently created mask work of identical geometry. Furthermore, reproduction for reverse engineering of a mask work is specifically permitted by the law. As with copyright, mask work rights exist when they are created, regardless of registration, unlike patents, which only confer rights after application, examination and issuance.

Mask work rights have more in common with copyrights than with other exclusive rights such as patents or trademarks. On the other hand, they are used alongside copyright to protect a read-only memory (ROM) component that is encoded to contain computer software.

The publisher of software for a cartridge-based video game console may seek simultaneous protection of its property under several legal constructs:

- A trademark registration on the game's title and possibly other marks such as fanciful names of worlds and characters used in the game (e.g., PAC-MAN®);
- A copyright registration on the program as a literary work or on the audiovisual displays generated by the work; and
- A mask work registration on the ROM that contains the binary.

Ordinary copyright law applies to the underlying software (source, binary) and original characters and art. But the expiration date for the term of additional exclusive rights in a work distributed in the form of a mask ROM would depend on an as yet untested interpretation of the originality requirement of § 902(b):

(b) Protection under this chapter (i.e., as a mask work) shall not be available for a mask work that—

(1) is not original; or
(2) consists of designs that are staple, commonplace, or familiar in the semiconductor industry, or variations of such designs, combined in a way that, considered as a whole, is not original

(17 U.S.C. § 902, as of November 2010).

Under one interpretation, a mask work containing a given game title is either entirely unoriginal, as mask ROM in general is likely a familiar design, or a minor variation of the mask work for any of the first titles released for the console in the region.

=== Other countries ===
Protection of circuit layout design legislation exists across the globe:

- Equivalent legislation exists in Australia, India and Hong Kong.
- Australian law refers to mask works as "eligible layouts" or ELs.
- In Canada these rights are protected under the Integrated Circuit Topography Act (1990, c. 37).
- In the European Union, a sui generis design right protecting the design of materials was introduced by the Directive 87/54/EEC which is transposed in all member states.
- India has the Semiconductor Integrated Circuits Layout Design Act, 2000 for the similar protection.
- Japan relies on "The Act Concerning the Circuit Layout of a Semiconductor Integrated Circuit".
- Brazil has enacted Law No. 11484, of 2007, to regulate the protection and registration of integrated circuit topography.
- Switzerland has the Topographies Act of 1992

== See also ==
- TRIPS Agreement
- Semiconductor intellectual property core
