= Adult film industry regulations =

Much of the regulation in the adult film industry has been limited to preventing child pornography. To enforce the age of entry restriction, most adult industry production companies are required to have a Custodian of Records that documents and holds records of the ages of all performers.

== United States ==
The Child Protection and Obscenity Enforcement Act of 1988 (Pub. L. 100–690, title VII, subtitle N (§7501 et seq.), November 18, 1988, 102 Stat. 4485, 18 U.S.C. § 2251 et seq.) is a United States Act of Congress, and part of the United States Code, which places stringent record-keeping requirements on the producers of actual, sexually explicit materials. The guidelines for enforcing these laws (colloquially known as 2257 Regulations (C.F.R. Part 75), part of the United States Code of Federal Regulations, require producers of sexually explicit material to obtain proof of age for every model they shoot, and retain those records. Federal inspectors may at any time launch inspections of these records and prosecute any infraction.

While the statute seemingly excluded from these record-keeping requirements anyone who is involved in an activity that "does not involve hiring, contracting for, managing, or otherwise arranging for, the participation of the performers depicted," the Department of Justice (DOJ) defined an entirely new class of producers known as "secondary producers." According to the DOJ, a secondary producer is anyone who "publishes, reproduces, or reissues" explicit material.

On October 23, 2007, the 6th Circuit U.S. Court of Appeals ruled that the record-keeping requirements were facially invalid because they imposed an overbroad burden on legitimate, constitutionally protected speech. However, the US DoJ, then under the control of Attorney General Michael Mukasey, asked for, and was granted, an en banc review of the initial decision of the 6th Circuit Court in order to see if the initial decision should be overturned. The Sixth Circuit subsequently reheard the case en banc and issued an opinion on February 20, 2009, upholding the constitutionality of the record-keeping requirements, albeit with some dissents.

The United States Supreme Court refused to hear (denied certiorari to) the April 2009 challenge to Connection Distributing Co. v. Holder, the Sixth Circuit Court of Appeals decision on the legality of 2257 and its enforcement. (See "Order List", Monday, October 5, 2009).

== United Kingdom ==
Extreme pornography is a term introduced by the UK Government in Part 5, Section 63 of the Criminal Justice and Immigration Act 2008, which made possession of such images a criminal offense from 26 January 2009. It refers to pornography (defined as an image which "of such a nature that it must reasonably be assumed to have been produced solely or principally for the purpose of sexual arousal") which is "grossly offensive, disgusting or otherwise of an obscene character", and portrays any of the following:

1. an act that threatens a person's life,
2. an act which results, or is likely to result, in serious injury to a person's anus, breasts, or genitals,
3. an act that involves or appears to involve sexual interference with a human corpse,
4. a person performing or appearing to perform an act of intercourse or oral sex with an animal (whether dead or alive),

such as a reasonable person looking at the image would think that any such person or animal was real.

The term covers staged acts and applies whether or not the participants consent. Classified works are exempt, but an extract from a classified work, if the image was extracted for the purpose of sexual arousal, would not be exempt. Whether an image is "pornographic" or not is up to the magistrate or jury to determine simply by looking at the image; it is not a question of the intentions of those who produced the image. If an image is held in a person's possession as part of a larger series of images, the question of whether it is pornographic is also determined by the context in which it appears. Therefore, an image might be legal in some contexts, but not in other contexts. Serious injury is not defined by the act but is up to the magistrate or jury. The bill gives examples of acts that would be covered: depictions of hanging, suffocation, or sexual assault involving a threat with a weapon; the insertion of sharp objects into or the mutilation of breasts or genitals.

The definition of "obscene" is not the same as that used in the Obscene Publications Acts, which requires that an image "deprave and corrupt" those likely to view it; instead, this is the ordinary dictionary definition of "obscene". "Grossly offensive" and "disgusting" are given as examples of "obscene".

There is a defense for the defendant if he can prove that he "directly participated" in the act, and where the participants consented, but only if the acts are those that can be legally consented to in the UK (see Operation Spanner). This defense is also not available to the photographer, or other "onlookers" who were present, but did not directly participate.

Where (a) or (b) apply, the maximum sentence is 3 years; otherwise, the maximum is 2 years. Adults sentenced to at least two years will be placed on the Violent and Sex Offender Register.

As a specific technical term, it appears to have been introduced in England following the death of Jane Longhurst in 2003 caused by Graham Coutts who was obsessed with such depictions downloaded from websites dedicated to such content.

== Court Cases ==
=== United States ===
The First Amendment in the United States Constitution guarantees freedom of speech. However, this does not apply to obscene materials. The following set of criteria was established by Roth v. United States in 1957 to measure obscenity. 1. The dominant theme of the work as a whole must appeal to prurient interest in sex. 2. The work must be patently offensive to contemporary community standards. 3. The work must be without serious literary, artistic, political, or scientific value.

Determining what materials contain obscenity remains highly subjective. However, community standards determine what constitutes obscenity. The standards vary tremendously from state to state. Some examples of obscenity cases are the Miller v. California of 1973 and Hicks v. Miranda of 1975.

== Internet pornography ==
Due to the international nature of the Internet, Internet pornography carries with it special issues with regard to the law. There is no one set of laws that apply to the distribution, purchase, or possession of Internet pornography. Only the laws of one's home nation apply with regard to distributing or possessing Internet pornography. This means that, for example, even if a pornographer is legally distributing pornography, the person receiving it may not be legally doing so due to local laws.

Some areas of legal concern regarding adult pornography are:

- Prohibiting certain or all types of pornography that are illegal within a government's jurisdiction. For countries that do not prohibit all pornography, this might include pornography featuring violence or bestiality, for example.
- Preventing those under the legal age (for most this means a minor under 18) from accessing pornographic content.
- Enforcing laws designed to ensure that performers in pornography are of legal age.

In jurisdictions that heavily restrict access or outright ban pornography, various attempts have been made to prevent access to pornographic content. The mandating of Internet filters to try preventing access to porn sites has been used in some nations such as China and Saudi Arabia. Banning porn sites within a nation's jurisdiction does not necessarily prevent access to that site, as it may simply relocate to a hosting server within another country that does not prohibit the content it offers. The United Kingdom's Digital Economy Act 2017 includes powers to require age-verification for pornographic Internet sites and the government accepted an amendment to allow the regulator to require ISPs to block access to non-compliant sites. As the BBFC are expected to become the regulator, this has caused discussion about ISPs being required to block content that is prohibited even under an R18 certificate, the prohibition of some of which is itself controversial.

Many nations that allow at least some types of pornography attempt to ensure that those under their legal age for accessing pornography (often 18 or 21) cannot easily access it. Various measures have been tried but with varying success. Within the United States, most websites have taken voluntary steps to ensure that visitors to their sites are not underage, although there is no federal law demanding such a policy. Many Web sites provide a warning upon entry, warning minors and those not interested in viewing porn not to view the site, and requiring one to affirm that one is at least 18 and wishing to view pornographic content. Such warnings are at times used with other techniques, specifically on commercial and premium streaming sites. Commercial pornography websites generally restrict access to any pornographic content until a membership has been purchased using a credit card. This serves as both a way to collect payment and an age verification method since credit cards are usually not issued to minors. Age verification services have also appeared offering access to any Web site that participates in their program without additional charge. The users need only verify their age with the verification service, which then issues a username and password that can access all sites that use its services. Most age verification sites charge either a monthly or yearly fee to those wanting access to participating sites.

Within nations that allow at least some types of pornography, models are often required to be at least a specific age (18 is most common). Various nations have various rules as to how a site must ensure that all porn models featured on it are of age such as strict record-keeping laws.

== See also ==
- Right to pornography, Stanley v. Georgia, a 1969 American Supreme Court case ruling
