= Helms Amendment =

Helms Amendment may refer one of two legislative actions initiated by US Senator Jesse Helms:

- Helms Amendment to the Foreign Assistance Act, US legislation designed to limit the use of foreign assistance funds for abortion.
- Helms AIDS Amendments, legislation designed to limit the use of government funds for AIDS educational materials.
