= 100th United States Congress =

1987–1989 U.S. legislative term

←	99th	101st	→
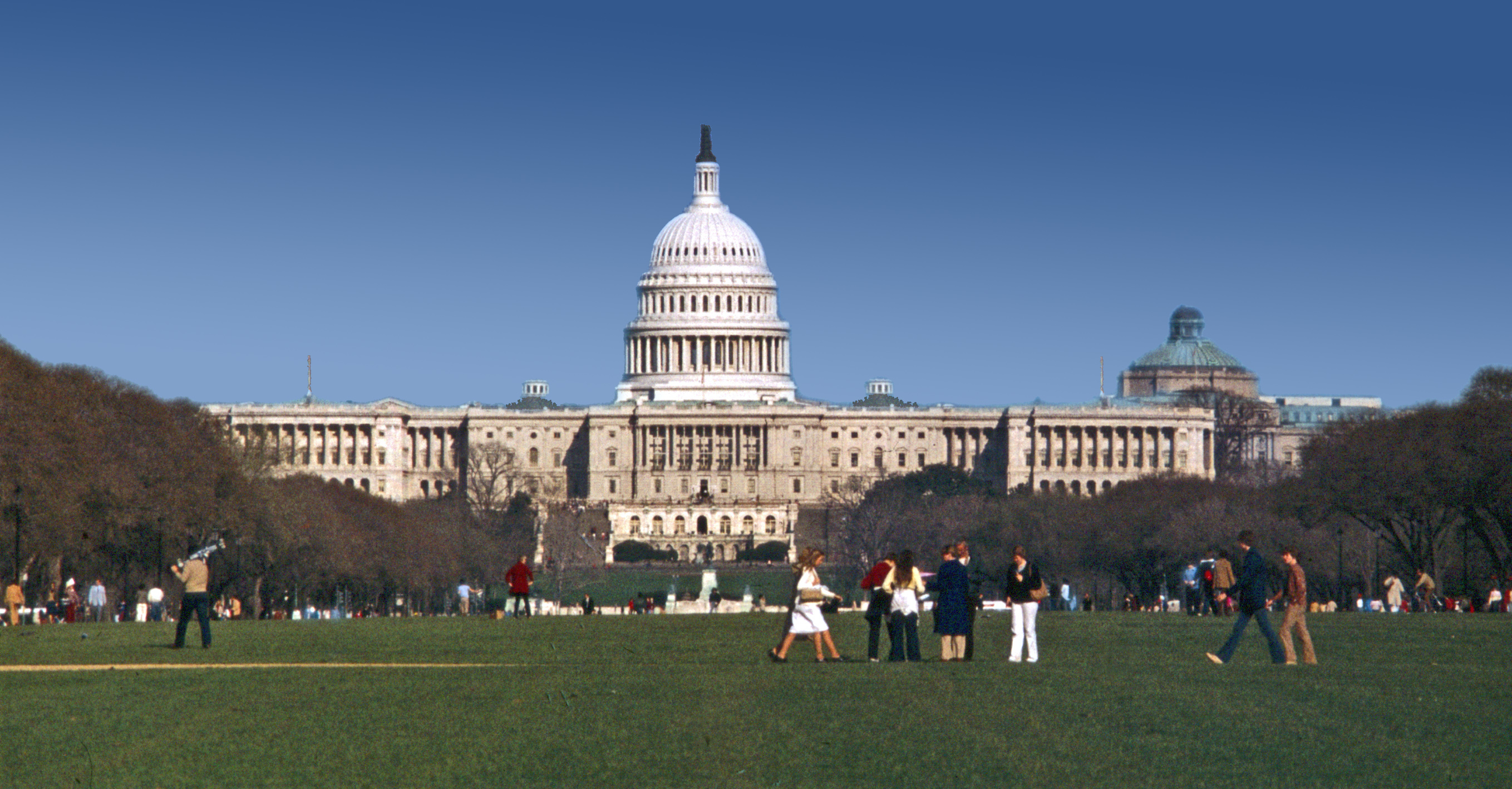
- United States Capitol (1980)

Overview
- Legislative body: United States Congress
- Jurisdiction: United States
- Term: January 3, 1987 – January 3, 1989

Senate
- Members: 100
- President: George H. W. Bush (R)
- President pro tempore: John C. Stennis (D)
- Party control: Democratic

House of Representatives
- Members: 435 representatives 5 non-voting delegates
- Speaker: Jim Wright (D)
- Party control: Democratic

Sessions
- 1st: January 6, 1987 – December 22, 1987
- 2nd: January 25, 1988 – October 22, 1988

The 100th United States Congress was a meeting of the legislative branch of the United States federal government, composed of the United States Senate and the United States House of Representatives. It met in Washington, D.C., from January 3, 1987, to January 3, 1989, during the last two years of Ronald Reagan's presidency. The apportionment of seats in the House of Representatives was based on the 1980 United States census.

This is the most recent Congress with a Democratic senator from the state of Mississippi, John C. Stennis, who retired at the end of Congress, and a Republican senator from the state of Connecticut, Lowell Weicker, who lost re-election in 1988.

Both chambers had a Democratic majority, with the Democrats increasing their lead in the House, and regaining the Senate for the first time since the 96th Congress from 1979 to 1981.

== Major events ==
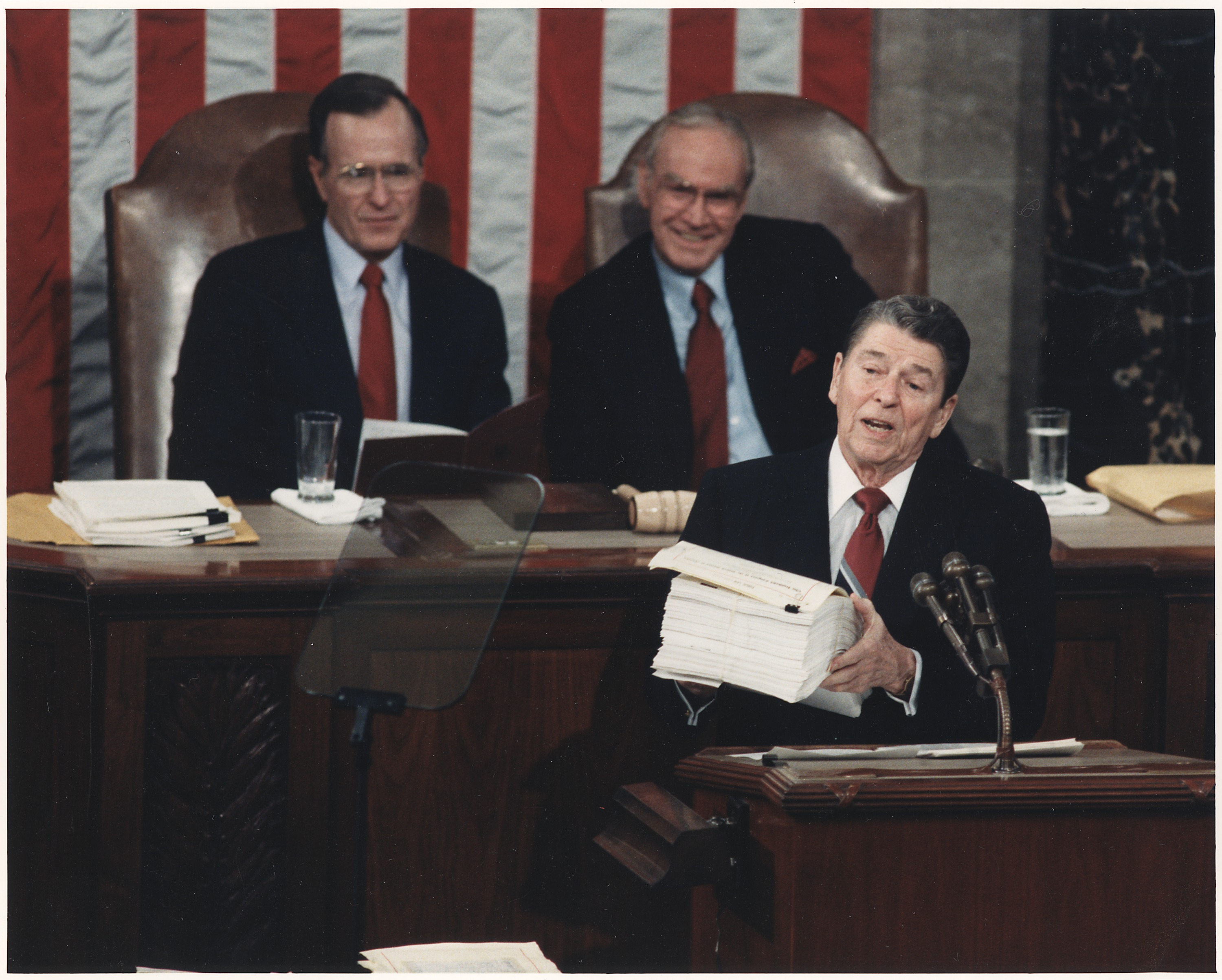
President Ronald Reagan with Vice President George Bush and House Speaker Jim Wright during the 1988 State of the Union Address, January 25, 1988

- July 16, 1987: The bicentennial of the Connecticut Compromise that resulted in Congress's present structure is marked by an unprecedented joint meeting outside Washington in Independence Hall.
- October 19, 1987: Black Monday: stocks fell sharply on Wall Street and around the world.
- October 23, 1987: The Senate rejected the nomination of Robert H. Bork to the United States Supreme Court on a vote of 42-58.
- November 18, 1987: Iran–Contra affair: Senate and House panels released reports charging President Reagan with 'ultimate responsibility' for the affair.
- January 25, 1988: President Reagan delivers the 1988 State of the Union Address.
- November 8, 1988: 1988 United States presidential election: George Bush was elected over Michael Dukakis; 1988 United States Senate elections and 1988 United States House of Representatives elections: Democrats retained control of Congress.

== Major legislation ==
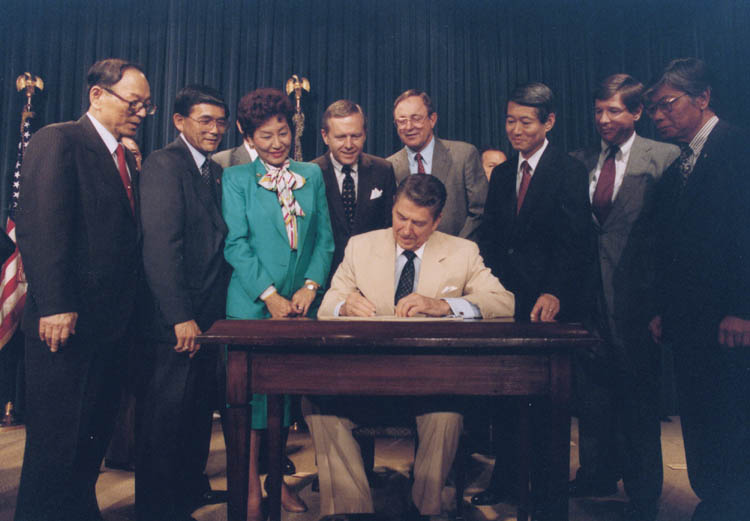
President Reagan signed the Civil Liberties Act of 1988 into law, August 10, 1988.

- March 17, 1987: National Appliance Energy Conservation Act, Pub. L. 100–12, 101 Stat. 103
- April 2, 1987: Surface Transportation and Uniform Relocation Assistance Act, Pub. L. 100–17, 101 Stat. 132
- July 22, 1987: McKinney–Vento Homeless Assistance Act, Pub. L. 100–77, 101 Stat. 482
- August 20, 1987: Malcolm Baldrige National Quality Improvement Act of 1987, Pub. L. 100–107, 101 Stat. 724
- September 29, 1987: Balanced Budget and Emergency Deficit Control Reaffirmation Act of 1987 (Gramm–Rudman–Hollings Balanced Budget Act), Pub. L. 100–119, title I
- December 22, 1987: Anti-Terrorism Act of 1987, Pub. L. 100–204, 101 Stat. 1406
- January 7, 1988: Computer Security Act of 1987, Pub. L. 100–235, 101 Stat. 1724
- February 5, 1988: Housing and Community Development Act of 1987, Pub. L. 100–242, 101 Stat. 1815
- March 22, 1988: Civil Rights Restoration Act of 1987 Pub. L. 100–259
- April 28, 1988: Abandoned Shipwrecks Act, Pub. L. 100–298, 101 Stat. 432
- June 27, 1988: Supreme Court Case Selections Act of 1988, Pub. L. 100–352, 102 Stat. 662
- July 1, 1988: Medicare Catastrophic Coverage Act, Pub. L. 100–360, 102 Stat. 683
- August 4, 1988: Worker Adjustment and Retraining Notification Act, Pub. L. 100–379, 102 Stat. 890
- August 10, 1988: Civil Liberties Act of 1988, Pub. L. 100–383, title I, 101 Stat. 904
- August 23, 1988: Omnibus Trade and Competitiveness Act, Pub. L. 100–418, 102 Stat. 1107
- October 13, 1988: Family Support Act, Pub. L. 100–485, 102 Stat. 2343
- October 17, 1988: Indian Gaming Regulatory Act, Pub. L. 100–497, 102 Stat. 2467
- October 24, 1988: Health Maintenance Organization Amendments of 1988, Pub. L. 100–517, 102 Stat. 2578
- October 25, 1988: Department of Veterans Affairs Act, Pub. L. 100–527, 102 Stat. 2635
- November 1, 1988: Medical Waste Tracking Act, Pub. L. 100–582, 102 Stat. 2950
- November 3, 1988: Fair Credit and Charge Card Disclosure Act, Pub. L. 100–583
- November 4, 1988: AIDS amendments of 1988, Pub. L. 100–607, 102 Stat. 3048
- November 4, 1988: Genocide Convention Implementation Act, Pub. L. 100–606, 102 Stat. 3045
- November 5, 1988: Video Privacy Protection Act, Pub. L. 100–618
- November 10, 1988: Undetectable Firearms Act,Pub. L. 100–649, 102 Stat. 3816
- November 17, 1988: Water Resources Development Act of 1988, Pub. L. 100–676
- November 18, 1988: Anti-Drug Abuse Act of 1988, Pub. L. 100–690, including Child Protection and Obscenity Enforcement Act and Alcoholic Beverage Labeling Act
- November 18, 1988: Chemical Diversion and Trafficking Act, Pub. L. 100–690, 102 Stat. 4181
- November 23, 1988: Stafford Disaster Relief and Emergency Assistance Act, Pub. L. 100–707, 102 Stat. 4689

== Treaties ratified ==
- May 27, 1988: Intermediate-Range Nuclear Forces Treaty

== Hearings ==
- May 6, 1987: Iran–Contra affair hearings began
- October 23, 1987: Robert Bork Supreme Court nomination: Senate rejected Robert Bork's nomination 42–58 to the Supreme Court of the United States
- February 3, 1988: Senate approved Anthony Kennedy's nomination 97–0 to the Supreme Court of the United States

== Party summary ==
=== Senate ===
Senators' party membership by state at the opening of the 100th Congress in January 1987 2 Democrats 1 Democrat and 1 Republican 2 Republicans

	Party (shading shows control)		Total	Vacant
	Democratic (D)	Republican (R)	Total	Vacant
End of previous congress	48	52	100	0
Begin	55	45	100	0
End	54	46	100	0
Final voting share	54.0%	46.0%		
Beginning of next congress	55	45	100	0

=== House of Representatives ===
House representation by state

	Party (shading shows control)		Total	Vacant
	Democratic (D)	Republican (R)	Total	Vacant
End of previous congress	251	180	431	4
Begin	258	177	435	0
End	255	178	433	2
Final voting share	58.9%	41.1%		
Non-voting members	4	1	5	
Beginning of next congress	259	174	433	2

== Leadership ==
=== Senate ===
Senate President

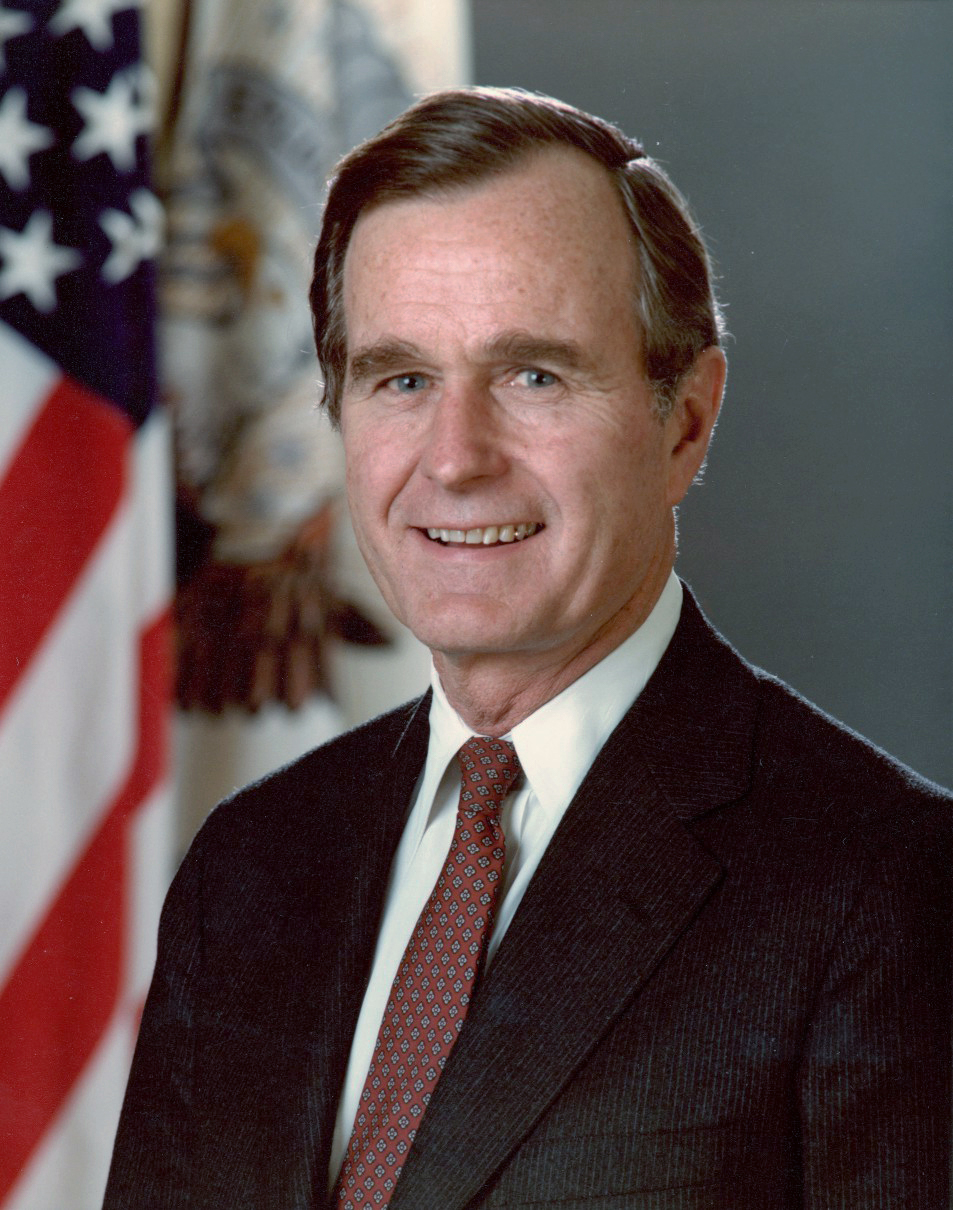
George H. W. Bush (R)

Senate President pro tempore

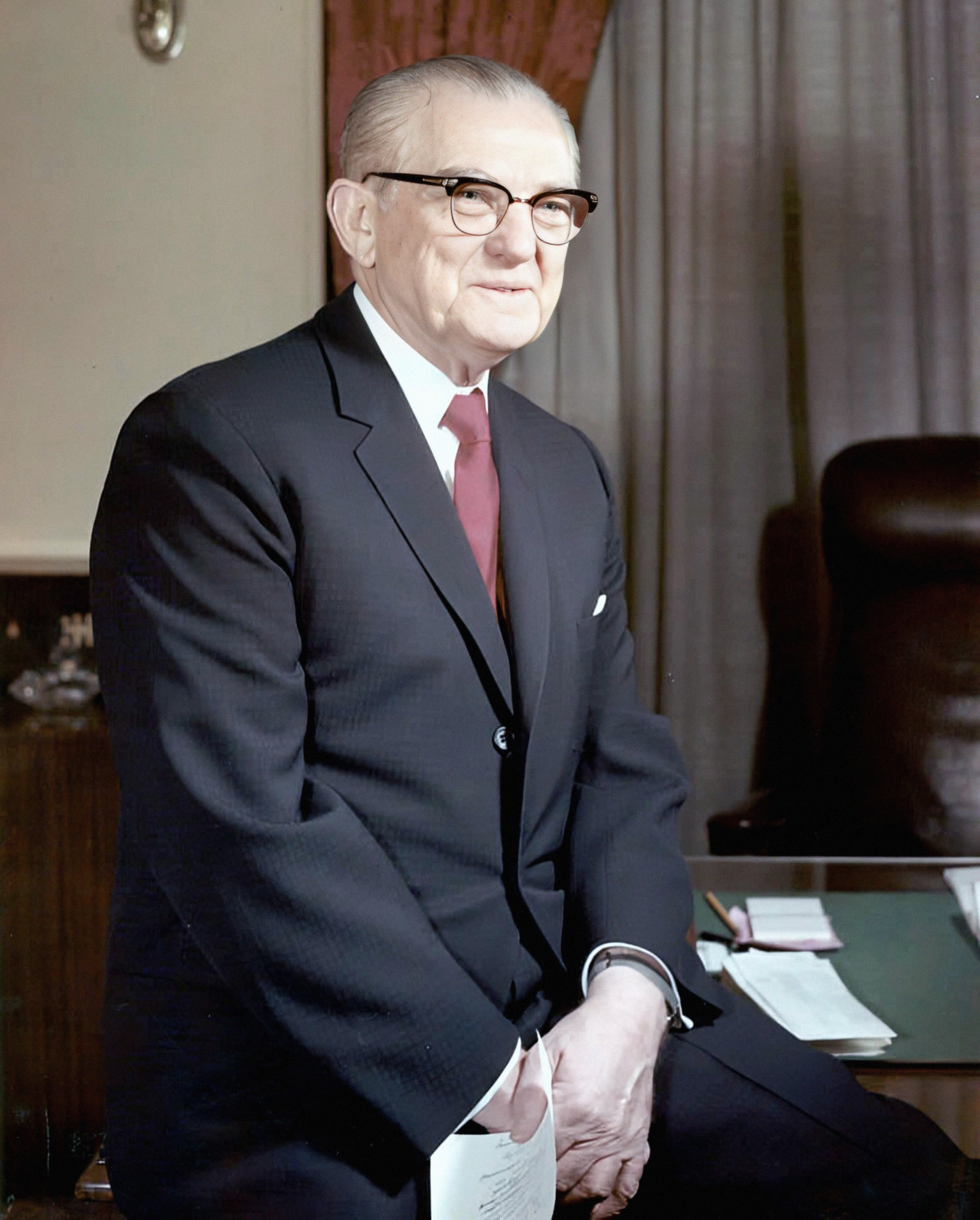
John C. Stennis (D)

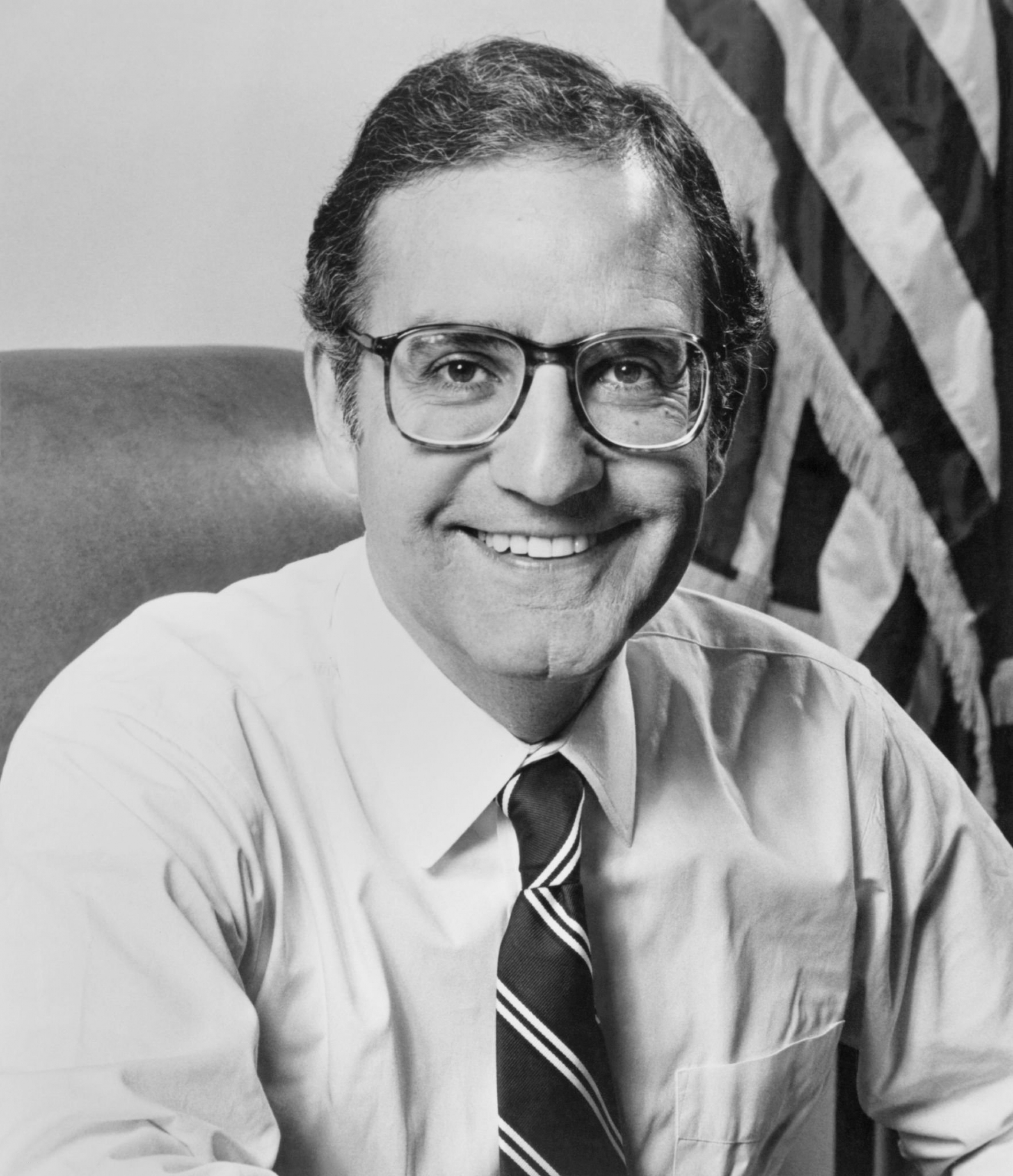
George J. Mitchell (D)
(Deputy)

- President: George Bush (R)
- President pro tempore: John Stennis (D)
- Deputy President pro tempore: George J. Mitchell (D)

==== Majority (Democratic) leadership ====
- Majority Leader, Democratic Conference Chairman, and Democratic Policy Committee Chairman: Robert Byrd
- Majority Whip: Alan Cranston
- Democratic Campaign Committee Chairman: John Kerry
- Democratic Caucus Secretary: Daniel Inouye

==== Minority (Republican) leadership ====
- Minority Leader: Bob Dole
- Minority Whip: Alan Simpson
- Republican Conference Chairman: John Chafee
- Republican Conference Secretary: Thad Cochran
- Policy Committee Chairman: William L. Armstrong
- Republican Campaign Committee Chairman: Rudy Boschwitz

=== House of Representatives ===
House Speaker

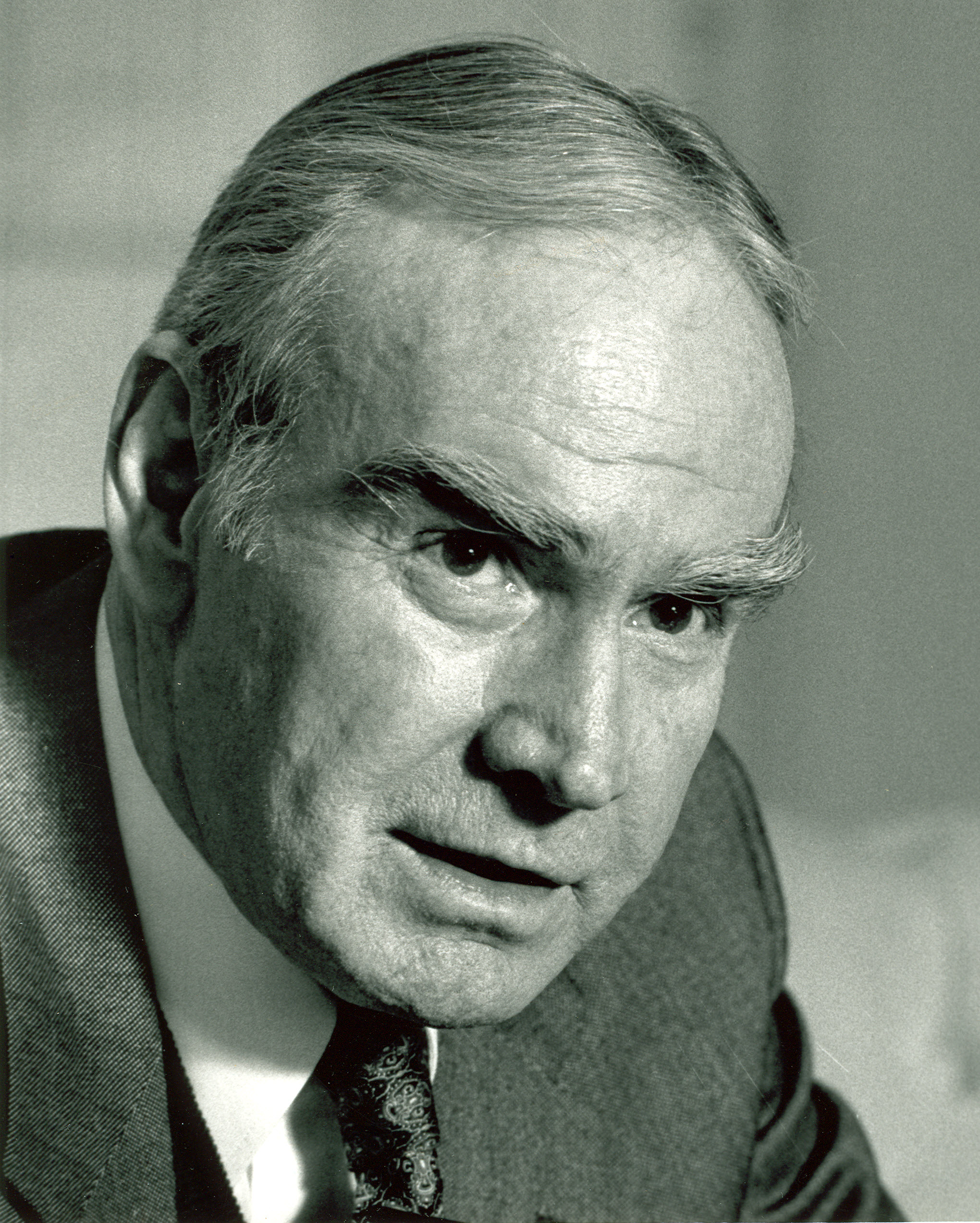
Jim Wright (D)

- Speaker: Jim Wright (D)

==== Majority (Democratic) leadership ====
- Majority Leader: Tom Foley
- Majority Whip: Tony Coelho
- Chief Deputy Majority Whip: David Bonior
- Democratic Caucus Chairman: Dick Gephardt
- Democratic Caucus Vice-Chairman: Mary Rose Oakar
- Democratic Campaign Committee Chairman: Beryl Anthony Jr.

==== Minority leadership ====
- Minority Leader: Robert H. Michel
- Minority Whip: Trent Lott
- Chief Deputy Whip: Edward Rell Madigan
- Republican Conference Chairman: Dick Cheney
- Republican Conference Vice-Chairman: Lynn Morley Martin
- Republican Conference Secretary: Robert J. Lagomarsino
- Policy Committee Chairman: Jerry Lewis
- Republican Campaign Committee Chairman: Guy Vander Jagt

== Caucuses ==
- Congressional Arts Caucus
- Congressional Automotive Caucus
- Congressional Black Caucus
- Congressional Fire Services Caucus
- Congressional Friends of Ireland Caucus
- Congressional Hispanic Caucus
- Congressional Pediatric & Adult Hydrocephalus Caucus
- Congressional Travel & Tourism Caucus
- Congresswomen's Caucus
- House Democratic Caucus
- Senate Democratic Caucus

== Members ==
This list is arranged by chamber, then by state. Senators are listed by class, and representatives are listed by district.

=== Senate ===
Senators are popularly elected statewide every two years, with one-third beginning new six-year terms with each Congress, In this Congress, Class 1 meant their term ended with this Congress, facing re-election in 1988; Class 2 meant their term began in the last Congress, facing re-election in 1990; and Class 3 meant their term began in this Congress, facing re-election in 1992.

==== Alabama ====
▌2. Howell Heflin (D)
▌3. Richard Shelby (D)

==== Alaska ====
▌2. Ted Stevens (R)
▌3. Frank Murkowski (R)

==== Arizona ====
▌1. Dennis DeConcini (D)
▌3. John McCain (R)

==== Arkansas ====
▌2. David Pryor (D)
▌3. Dale Bumpers (D)

==== California ====
▌1. Pete Wilson (R)
▌3. Alan Cranston (D)

==== Colorado ====
▌2. William L. Armstrong (R)
▌3. Tim Wirth (D)

==== Connecticut ====
▌1. Lowell Weicker (R)
▌3. Chris Dodd (D)

==== Delaware ====
▌1. William Roth (R)
▌2. Joe Biden (D)

==== Florida ====
▌1. Lawton Chiles (D)
▌3. Bob Graham (D)

==== Georgia ====
▌2. Sam Nunn (D)
▌3. Wyche Fowler (D)

==== Hawaii ====
▌1. Spark Matsunaga (D)
▌3. Daniel Inouye (D)

==== Idaho ====
▌2. James A. McClure (R)
▌3. Steve Symms (R)

==== Illinois ====
▌2. Paul Simon (D)
▌3. Alan J. Dixon (D)

==== Indiana ====
▌1. Richard Lugar (R)
▌3. Dan Quayle (R)

==== Iowa ====
▌2. Tom Harkin (D)
▌3. Chuck Grassley (R)

==== Kansas ====
▌2. Nancy Kassebaum (R)
▌3. Bob Dole (R)

==== Kentucky ====
▌2. Mitch McConnell (R)
▌3. Wendell Ford (D)

==== Louisiana ====
▌2. J. Bennett Johnston (D)
▌3. John Breaux (D)

==== Maine ====
▌1. George J. Mitchell (D)
▌2. William Cohen (R)

==== Maryland ====
▌1. Paul Sarbanes (D)
▌3. Barbara Mikulski (D)

==== Massachusetts ====
▌1. Ted Kennedy (D)
▌2. John Kerry (D)

==== Michigan ====
▌1. Donald Riegle (D)
▌2. Carl Levin (D)

==== Minnesota ====
▌1. David Durenberger (I-R) (Note: The Republican Party of Minnesota was officially known as the Independent-Republicans of Minnesota from November 15, 1975, until September 23, 1995, and are counted as Republicans.)
▌2. Rudy Boschwitz (I-R)

==== Mississippi ====
▌1. John C. Stennis (D)
▌2. Thad Cochran (R)

==== Missouri ====
▌1. John Danforth (R)
▌3. Kit Bond (R)

==== Montana ====
▌1. John Melcher (D)
▌2. Max Baucus (D)

==== Nebraska ====
▌1. Edward Zorinsky (D), until March 6, 1987

▌David Karnes (R), from March 11, 1987, until January 3, 1989

▌2. J. James Exon (D)

==== Nevada ====
▌1. Chic Hecht (R)
▌3. Harry Reid (D)

==== New Hampshire ====
▌2. Gordon J. Humphrey (R)
▌3. Warren Rudman (R)

==== New Jersey ====
▌1. Frank Lautenberg (D)
▌2. Bill Bradley (D)

==== New Mexico ====
▌1. Jeff Bingaman (D)
▌2. Pete Domenici (R)

==== New York ====
▌1. Daniel Patrick Moynihan (D)
▌3. Al D'Amato (R)

==== North Carolina ====
▌2. Jesse Helms (R)
▌3. Terry Sanford (D)

==== North Dakota ====
▌1. Quentin Burdick (D-NPL) (Note: The Minnesota Democratic–Farmer–Labor Party (DFL) and the North Dakota Democratic-Nonpartisan League Party (D-NPL) are the Minnesota and North Dakota affiliates of the U.S. Democratic Party and are counted as Democrats.)
▌3. Kent Conrad (D-NPL)

==== Ohio ====
▌1. Howard Metzenbaum (D)
▌3. John Glenn (D)

==== Oklahoma ====
▌2. David Boren (D)
▌3. Don Nickles (R)

==== Oregon ====
▌2. Mark Hatfield (R)
▌3. Bob Packwood (R)

==== Pennsylvania ====
▌1. John Heinz (R)
▌3. Arlen Specter (R)

==== Rhode Island ====
▌1. John Chafee (R)
▌2. Claiborne Pell (D)

==== South Carolina ====
▌2. Strom Thurmond (R)
▌3. Fritz Hollings (D)

==== South Dakota ====
▌2. Larry Pressler (R)
▌3. Tom Daschle (D)

==== Tennessee ====
▌1. Jim Sasser (D)
▌2. Al Gore (D)

==== Texas ====
▌1. Lloyd Bentsen (D)
▌2. Phil Gramm (R)

==== Utah ====
▌1. Orrin Hatch (R)
▌3. Jake Garn (R)

==== Vermont ====
▌1. Robert Stafford (R)
▌3. Patrick Leahy (D)

==== Virginia ====
▌1. Paul Trible (R)
▌2. John Warner (R)

==== Washington ====
▌1. Daniel J. Evans (R)
▌3. Brock Adams (D)

==== West Virginia ====
▌1. Robert Byrd (D)
▌2. Jay Rockefeller (D)

==== Wisconsin ====
▌1. William Proxmire (D)
▌3. Bob Kasten (R)

==== Wyoming ====
▌1. Malcolm Wallop (R)
▌2. Alan Simpson (R)

Senate majority leadership

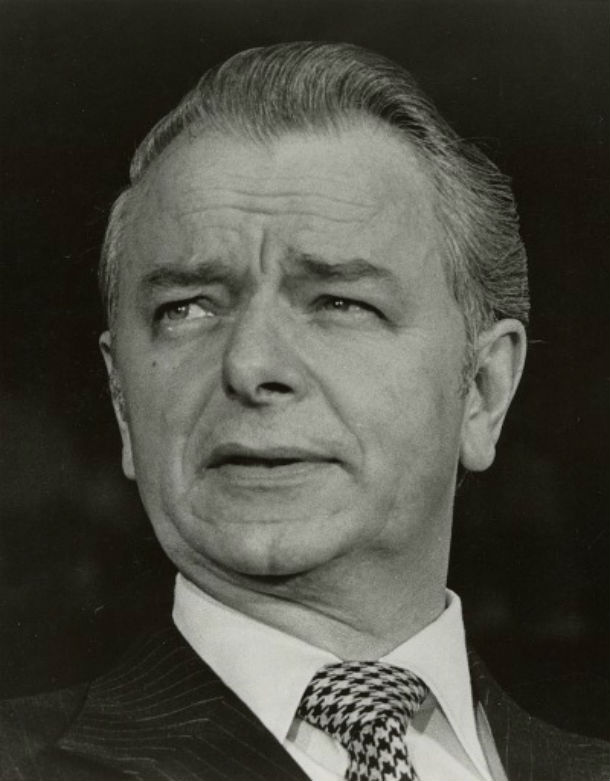
Democratic leader
Robert Byrd

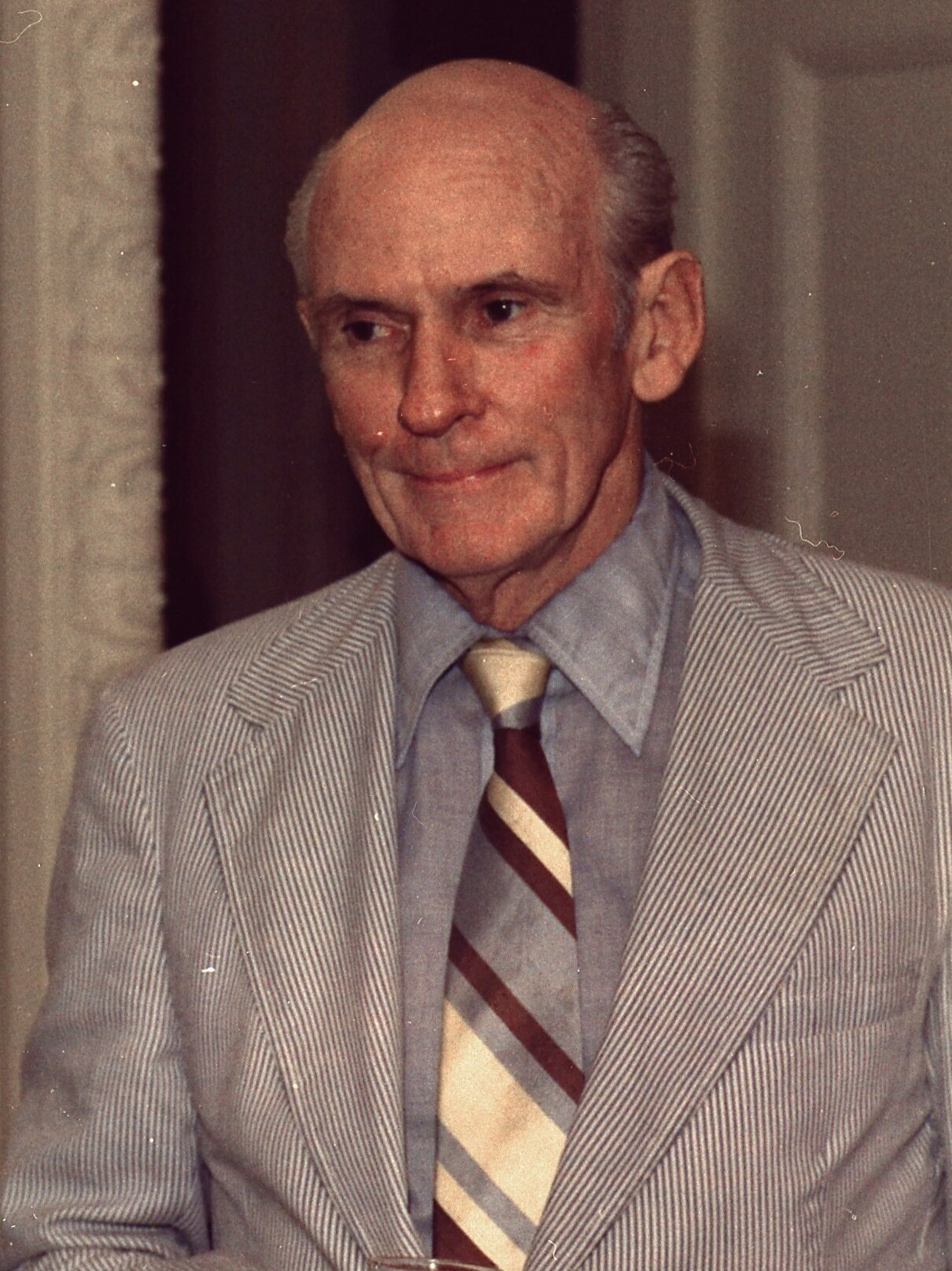
Democratic whip
Alan Cranston

Senate minority leadership

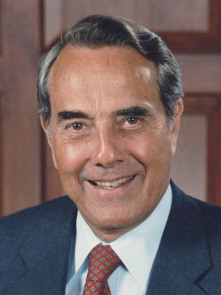
Republican leader
Bob Dole

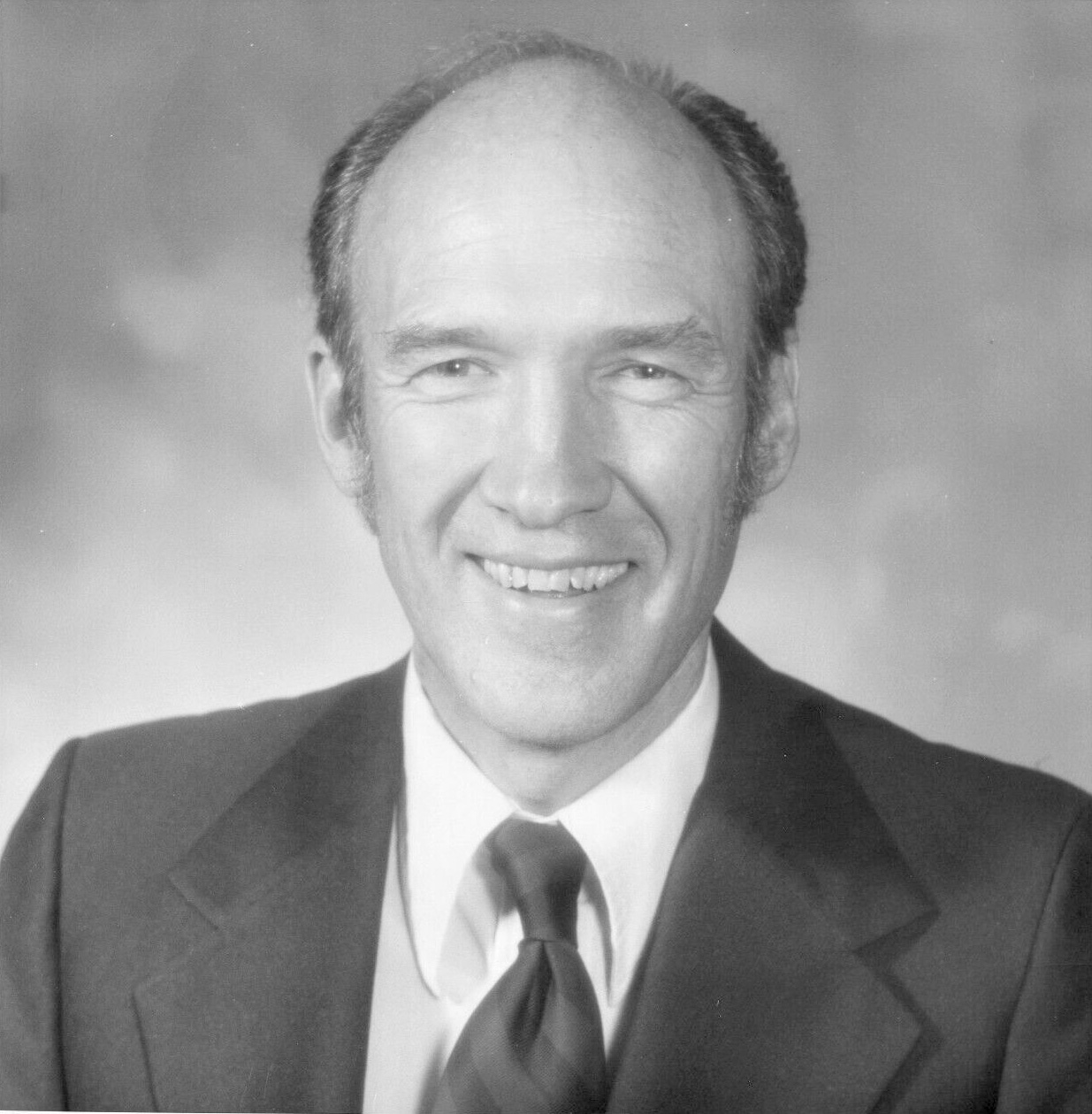
Republican whip
Alan K. Simpson

=== House of Representatives ===
==== Alabama ====
▌1. Sonny Callahan (R)
▌2. William Louis Dickinson (R)
▌3. Bill Nichols (D), until December 13, 1988
▌4. Tom Bevill (D)
▌5. Ronnie Flippo (D)
▌6. Ben Erdreich (D)
▌7. Claude Harris Jr. (D)

==== Alaska ====
▌At-large. Don Young (R)

==== Arizona ====
▌1. John Jacob Rhodes III (R)
▌2. Mo Udall (D)
▌3. Bob Stump (R)
▌4. Jon Kyl (R)
▌5. Jim Kolbe (R)

==== Arkansas ====
▌1. William Vollie Alexander Jr. (D)
▌2. Tommy F. Robinson (D)
▌3. John Paul Hammerschmidt (R)
▌4. Beryl Anthony Jr. (D)

==== California ====
▌1. Douglas H. Bosco (D)
▌2. Wally Herger (R)
▌3. Bob Matsui (D)
▌4. Vic Fazio (D)
▌5. Sala Burton (D), until February 1, 1987

▌Nancy Pelosi (D), from June 2, 1987

▌6. Barbara Boxer (D)
▌7. George Miller (D)
▌8. Ron Dellums (D)
▌9. Pete Stark (D)
▌10. Don Edwards (D)
▌11. Tom Lantos (D)
▌12. Ernie Konnyu (R)
▌13. Norman Mineta (D)
▌14. Norman D. Shumway (R)
▌15. Tony Coelho (D)
▌16. Leon Panetta (D)
▌17. Chip Pashayan (R)
▌18. Richard H. Lehman (D)
▌19. Robert J. Lagomarsino (R)
▌20. Bill Thomas (R)
▌21. Elton Gallegly (R)
▌22. Carlos Moorhead (R)
▌23. Anthony Beilenson (D)
▌24. Henry Waxman (D)
▌25. Edward R. Roybal (D)
▌26. Howard Berman (D)
▌27. Mel Levine (D)
▌28. Julian Dixon (D)
▌29. Augustus Hawkins (D)
▌30. Matthew G. Martínez (D)
▌31. Mervyn Dymally (D)
▌32. Glenn M. Anderson (D)
▌33. David Dreier (R)
▌34. Esteban Edward Torres (D)
▌35. Jerry Lewis (R)
▌36. George Brown Jr. (D)
▌37. Al McCandless (R)
▌38. Bob Dornan (R)
▌39. William E. Dannemeyer (R)
▌40. Robert Badham (R)
▌41. Bill Lowery (R)
▌42. Dan Lungren (R)
▌43. Ron Packard (R)
▌44. Jim Bates (D)
▌45. Duncan L. Hunter (R)

==== Colorado ====
▌1. Pat Schroeder (D)
▌2. David Skaggs (D)
▌3. Ben Nighthorse Campbell (D)
▌4. Hank Brown (R)
▌5. Joel Hefley (R)
▌6. Dan Schaefer (R)

==== Connecticut ====
▌1. Barbara B. Kennelly (D)
▌2. Sam Gejdenson (D)
▌3. Bruce Morrison (D)
▌4. Stewart McKinney (R), until May 7, 1987
4. Chris Shays (R), from August 18, 1987
▌5. John G. Rowland (R)
▌6. Nancy Johnson (R)

==== Delaware ====
▌At-large. Tom Carper (D)

==== Florida ====
▌1. Earl Hutto (D)
▌2. Bill Grant (D)
▌3. Charles E. Bennett (D)
▌4. Bill Chappell (D)
▌5. Bill McCollum (R)
▌6. Buddy MacKay (D)
▌7. Sam Gibbons (D)
▌8. Bill Young (R)
▌9. Michael Bilirakis (R)
▌10. Andy Ireland (R)
▌11. Bill Nelson (D)
▌12. Tom Lewis (R)
▌13. Connie Mack III (R)
▌14. Dan Mica (D)
▌15. Clay Shaw (R)
▌16. Lawrence J. Smith (D)
▌17. William Lehman (D)
▌18. Claude Pepper (D)
▌19. Dante Fascell (D)

==== Georgia ====
▌1. Lindsay Thomas (D)
▌2. Charles Floyd Hatcher (D)
▌3. Richard Ray (D)
▌4. Pat Swindall (R)
▌5. John Lewis (D)
▌6. Newt Gingrich (R)
▌7. George Darden (D)
▌8. J. Roy Rowland (D)
▌9. Ed Jenkins (D)
▌10. Doug Barnard Jr. (D)

==== Hawaii ====
▌1. Pat Saiki (R)
▌2. Daniel Akaka (D)

==== Idaho ====
▌1. Larry Craig (R)
▌2. Richard H. Stallings (D)

==== Illinois ====
▌1. Charles Hayes (D)
▌2. Gus Savage (D)
▌3. Marty Russo (D)
▌4. Jack Davis (R)
▌5. Bill Lipinski (D)
▌6. Henry Hyde (R)
▌7. Cardiss Collins (D)
▌8. Dan Rostenkowski (D)
▌9. Sidney R. Yates (D)
▌10. John Porter (R)
▌11. Frank Annunzio (D)
▌12. Phil Crane (R)
▌13. Harris Fawell (R)
▌14. Dennis Hastert (R)
▌15. Edward Madigan (R)
▌16. Lynn Morley Martin (R)
▌17. Lane Evans (D)
▌18. Robert H. Michel (R)
▌19. Terry L. Bruce (D)
▌20. Dick Durbin (D)
▌21. Melvin Price (D), until April 22, 1988

▌Jerry Costello (D), from August 9, 1988

▌22. Kenneth J. Gray (D)

==== Indiana ====
▌1. Pete Visclosky (D)
▌2. Philip Sharp (D)
▌3. John P. Hiler (R)
▌4. Dan Coats (R)
▌5. Jim Jontz (D)
▌6. Dan Burton (R)
▌7. John T. Myers (R)
▌8. Frank McCloskey (D)
▌9. Lee Hamilton (D)
▌10. Andrew Jacobs Jr. (D)

==== Iowa ====
▌1. Jim Leach (R)
▌2. Tom Tauke (R)
▌3. David R. Nagle (D)
▌4. Neal Smith (D)
▌5. Jim Ross Lightfoot (R)
▌6. Fred Grandy (R)

==== Kansas ====
▌1. Pat Roberts (R)
▌2. Jim Slattery (D)
▌3. Jan Meyers (R)
▌4. Dan Glickman (D)
▌5. Bob Whittaker (R)

==== Kentucky ====
▌1. Carroll Hubbard (D)
▌2. William Natcher (D)
▌3. Romano Mazzoli (D)
▌4. Jim Bunning (R)
▌5. Hal Rogers (R)
▌6. Larry J. Hopkins (R)
▌7. Chris Perkins (D)

==== Louisiana ====
▌1. Bob Livingston (R)
▌2. Lindy Boggs (D)
▌3. Billy Tauzin (D)
▌4. Buddy Roemer (D), until March 14, 1988
4. Jim McCrery (R), from April 16, 1988
▌5. Jerry Huckaby (D)
▌6. Richard Baker (R)
▌7. Jimmy Hayes (D)
▌8. Clyde C. Holloway (R)

==== Maine ====
▌1. Joseph E. Brennan (D)
▌2. Olympia Snowe (R)

==== Maryland ====
▌1. Roy Dyson (D)
▌2. Helen Delich Bentley (R)
▌3. Ben Cardin (D)
▌4. Tom McMillen (D)
▌5. Steny Hoyer (D)
▌6. Beverly Byron (D)
▌7. Kweisi Mfume (D)
▌8. Connie Morella (R)

==== Massachusetts ====
▌1. Silvio O. Conte (R)
▌2. Edward Boland (D)
▌3. Joseph D. Early (D)
▌4. Barney Frank (D)
▌5. Chester G. Atkins (D)
▌6. Nicholas Mavroules (D)
▌7. Ed Markey (D)
▌8. Joseph P. Kennedy II (D)
▌9. Joe Moakley (D)
▌10. Gerry Studds (D)
▌11. Brian J. Donnelly (D)

==== Michigan ====
▌1. John Conyers (D)
▌2. Carl Pursell (R)
▌3. Howard Wolpe (D)
▌4. Fred Upton (R)
▌5. Paul B. Henry (R)
▌6. Milton Robert Carr (D)
▌7. Dale Kildee (D)
▌8. J. Bob Traxler (D)
▌9. Guy Vander Jagt (R)
▌10. Bill Schuette (R)
▌11. Robert William Davis (R)
▌12. David Bonior (D)
▌13. George Crockett Jr. (D)
▌14. Dennis Hertel (D)
▌15. William D. Ford (D)
▌16. John Dingell (D)
▌17. Sander Levin (D)
▌18. William Broomfield (R)

==== Minnesota ====
▌1. Tim Penny (DFL)
▌2. Vin Weber (I-R)
▌3. Bill Frenzel (I-R)
▌4. Bruce Vento (DFL)
▌5. Martin Olav Sabo (DFL)
▌6. Gerry Sikorski (DFL)
▌7. Arlan Stangeland (I-R)
▌8. Jim Oberstar (DFL)

==== Mississippi ====
▌1. Jamie Whitten (D)
▌2. Mike Espy (D)
▌3. Sonny Montgomery (D)
▌4. Wayne Dowdy (D)
▌5. Trent Lott (R)

==== Missouri ====
▌1. Bill Clay (D)
▌2. Jack Buechner (R)
▌3. Dick Gephardt (D)
▌4. Ike Skelton (D)
▌5. Alan Wheat (D)
▌6. Tom Coleman (R)
▌7. Gene Taylor (R)
▌8. Bill Emerson (R)
▌9. Harold Volkmer (D)

==== Montana ====
▌1. Pat Williams (D)
▌2. Ron Marlenee (R)

==== Nebraska ====
▌1. Doug Bereuter (R)
▌2. Hal Daub (R)
▌3. Virginia D. Smith (R)

==== Nevada ====
▌1. James Bilbray (D)
▌2. Barbara Vucanovich (R)

==== New Hampshire ====
▌1. Bob Smith (R)
▌2. Judd Gregg (R)

==== New Jersey ====
▌1. James Florio (D)
▌2. William J. Hughes (D)
▌3. James J. Howard (D), until March 25, 1988

▌Frank Pallone (D), from November 8, 1988

▌4. Chris Smith (R)
▌5. Marge Roukema (R)
▌6. Bernard J. Dwyer (D)
▌7. Matthew John Rinaldo (R)
▌8. Robert A. Roe (D)
▌9. Robert Torricelli (D)
▌10. Peter W. Rodino (D)
▌11. Dean Gallo (R)
▌12. Jim Courter (R)
▌13. Jim Saxton (R)
▌14. Frank Joseph Guarini (D)

==== New Mexico ====
▌1. Manuel Lujan Jr. (R)
▌2. Joe Skeen (R)
▌3. Bill Richardson (D)

==== New York ====
▌1. George J. Hochbrueckner (D)
▌2. Thomas Downey (D)
▌3. Robert J. Mrazek (D)
▌4. Norman F. Lent (R)
▌5. Raymond J. McGrath (R)
▌6. Floyd Flake (D)
▌7. Gary Ackerman (D)
▌8. James H. Scheuer (D)
▌9. Thomas J. Manton (D)
▌10. Chuck Schumer (D)
▌11. Edolphus Towns (D)
▌12. Major Owens (D)
▌13. Stephen Solarz (D)
▌14. Guy Molinari (R)
▌15. Bill Green (R)
▌16. Charles Rangel (D)
▌17. Ted Weiss (D)
▌18. Robert Garcia (D)
▌19. Mario Biaggi (D), until August 5, 1988
▌20. Joe DioGuardi (R)
▌21. Hamilton Fish IV (R)
▌22. Benjamin Gilman (R)
▌23. Samuel S. Stratton (D)
▌24. Gerald Solomon (R)
▌25. Sherwood Boehlert (R)
▌26. David O'Brien Martin (R)
▌27. George C. Wortley (R)
▌28. Matthew F. McHugh (D)
▌29. Frank Horton (R)
▌30. Louise Slaughter (D)
▌31. Jack Kemp (R)
▌32. John LaFalce (D)
▌33. Henry J. Nowak (D)
▌34. Amo Houghton (R)

==== North Carolina ====
▌1. Walter B. Jones Sr. (D)
▌2. Tim Valentine (D)
▌3. Martin Lancaster (D)
▌4. David Price (D)
▌5. Stephen L. Neal (D)
▌6. Howard Coble (R)
▌7. Charlie Rose (D)
▌8. Bill Hefner (D)
▌9. Alex McMillan (R)
▌10. Cass Ballenger (R)
▌11. James M. Clarke (D)

==== North Dakota ====
▌At-large. Byron Dorgan (D-NPL)

==== Ohio ====
▌1. Tom Luken (D)
▌2. Bill Gradison (R)
▌3. Tony P. Hall (D)
▌4. Mike Oxley (R)
▌5. Del Latta (R)
▌6. Bob McEwen (R)
▌7. Mike DeWine (R)
▌8. Donald "Buz" Lukens (R)
▌9. Marcy Kaptur (D)
▌10. Clarence E. Miller (R)
▌11. Dennis E. Eckart (D)
▌12. John Kasich (R)
▌13. Don Pease (D)
▌14. Tom Sawyer (D)
▌15. Chalmers Wylie (R)
▌16. Ralph Regula (R)
▌17. Jim Traficant (D)
▌18. Douglas Applegate (D)
▌19. Ed Feighan (D)
▌20. Mary Rose Oakar (D)
▌21. Louis Stokes (D)

==== Oklahoma ====
▌1. Jim Inhofe (R)
▌2. Mike Synar (D)
▌3. Wes Watkins (D)
▌4. Dave McCurdy (D)
▌5. Mickey Edwards (R)
▌6. Glenn English (D)

==== Oregon ====
▌1. Les AuCoin (D)
▌2. Bob Smith (R)
▌3. Ron Wyden (D)
▌4. Peter DeFazio (D)
▌5. Denny Smith (R)

==== Pennsylvania ====
▌1. Thomas M. Foglietta (D)
▌2. William H. Gray III (D)
▌3. Robert A. Borski Jr. (D)
▌4. Joseph P. Kolter (D)
▌5. Richard T. Schulze (R)
▌6. Gus Yatron (D)
▌7. Curt Weldon (R)
▌8. Peter H. Kostmayer (D)
▌9. Bud Shuster (R)
▌10. Joseph M. McDade (R)
▌11. Paul Kanjorski (D)
▌12. John Murtha (D)
▌13. Lawrence Coughlin (R)
▌14. William J. Coyne (D)
▌15. Donald L. Ritter (R)
▌16. Bob Walker (R)
▌17. George Gekas (R)
▌18. Doug Walgren (D)
▌19. Bill Goodling (R)
▌20. Joseph M. Gaydos (D)
▌21. Tom Ridge (R)
▌22. Austin Murphy (D)
▌23. William Clinger (R)

==== Rhode Island ====
▌1. Fernand St. Germain (D)
▌2. Claudine Schneider (R)

==== South Carolina ====
▌1. Arthur Ravenel Jr. (R)
▌2. Floyd Spence (R)
▌3. Butler Derrick (D)
▌4. Liz J. Patterson (D)
▌5. John Spratt (D)
▌6. Robin Tallon (D)

==== South Dakota ====
▌At-large. Tim Johnson (D)

==== Tennessee ====
▌1. Jimmy Quillen (R)
▌2. John Duncan Sr. (R), until June 21, 1988

▌2. Jimmy Duncan (R), from November 8, 1988

▌3. Marilyn Lloyd (D)
▌4. Jim Cooper (D)
▌5. Bill Boner (D), until October 5, 1987

▌5. Bob Clement (D), from January 19, 1988

▌6. Bart Gordon (D)
▌7. Don Sundquist (R)
▌8. Ed Jones (D)
▌9. Harold Ford Sr. (D)

==== Texas ====
▌1. Jim Chapman (D)
▌2. Charlie Wilson (D)
▌3. Steve Bartlett (R)
▌4. Ralph Hall (D)
▌5. John Wiley Bryant (D)
▌6. Joe Barton (R)
▌7. Bill Archer (R)
▌8. Jack Fields (R)
▌9. Jack Brooks (D)
▌10. J. J. Pickle (D)
▌11. Marvin Leath (D)
▌12. Jim Wright (D)
▌13. Beau Boulter (R)
▌14. Mac Sweeney (R)
▌15. Kika de la Garza (D)
▌16. Ronald D. Coleman (D)
▌17. Charles Stenholm (D)
▌18. Mickey Leland (D)
▌19. Larry Combest (R)
▌20. Henry B. González (D)
▌21. Lamar Smith (R)
▌22. Tom DeLay (R)
▌23. Albert Bustamante (D)
▌24. Martin Frost (D)
▌25. Michael A. Andrews (D)
▌26. Dick Armey (R)
▌27. Solomon P. Ortiz (D)

==== Utah ====
▌1. Jim Hansen (R)
▌2. Wayne Owens (D)
▌3. Howard C. Nielson (R)

==== Vermont ====
▌At-large. Jim Jeffords (R)

==== Virginia ====
▌1. Herbert H. Bateman (R)
▌2. Owen B. Pickett (D)
▌3. Thomas J. Bliley Jr. (R)
▌4. Norman Sisisky (D)
▌5. Dan Daniel (D), until January 23, 1988

▌Lewis F. Payne Jr. (D), from June 14, 1988

▌6. Jim Olin (D)
▌7. D. French Slaughter Jr. (R)
▌8. Stanford Parris (R)
▌9. Rick Boucher (D)
▌10. Frank Wolf (R)

==== Washington ====
▌1. John Miller (R)
▌2. Al Swift (D)
▌3. Don Bonker (D)
▌4. Sid Morrison (R)
▌5. Tom Foley (D)
▌6. Norm Dicks (D)
▌7. Mike Lowry (D)
▌8. Rod Chandler (R)

==== West Virginia ====
▌1. Alan Mollohan (D)
▌2. Harley O. Staggers Jr. (D)
▌3. Bob Wise (D)
▌4. Nick Rahall (D)

==== Wisconsin ====
▌1. Les Aspin (D)
▌2. Robert Kastenmeier (D)
▌3. Steve Gunderson (R)
▌4. Jerry Kleczka (D)
▌5. Jim Moody (D)
▌6. Tom Petri (R)
▌7. Dave Obey (D)
▌8. Toby Roth (R)
▌9. Jim Sensenbrenner (R)

==== Wyoming ====
▌At-large. Dick Cheney (R)

==== Non-voting members ====
▌American Samoa. Fofō Iosefa Fiti Sunia (D), until September 6, 1988
▌District of Columbia. Walter Fauntroy (D)
▌Guam. Vicente T. Blaz (R)
▌Puerto Rico. Jaime Fuster (PPD)
▌Virgin Islands. Ron de Lugo (D)

House majority leadership

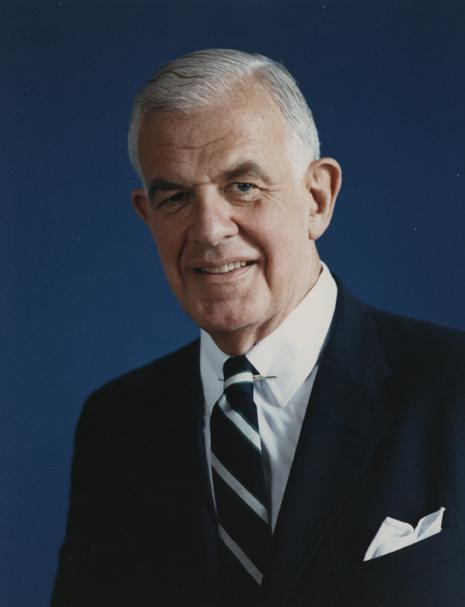
Democratic leader
Tom Foley

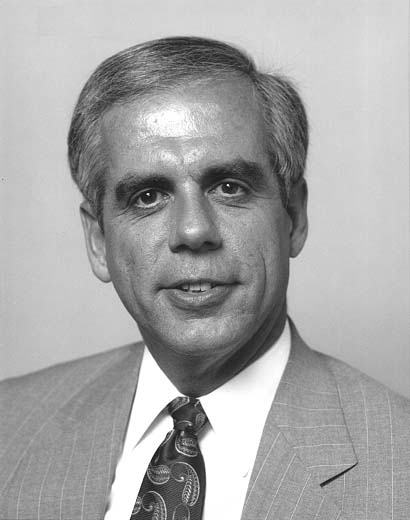
Democratic whip
Tony Coelho

House minority leadership

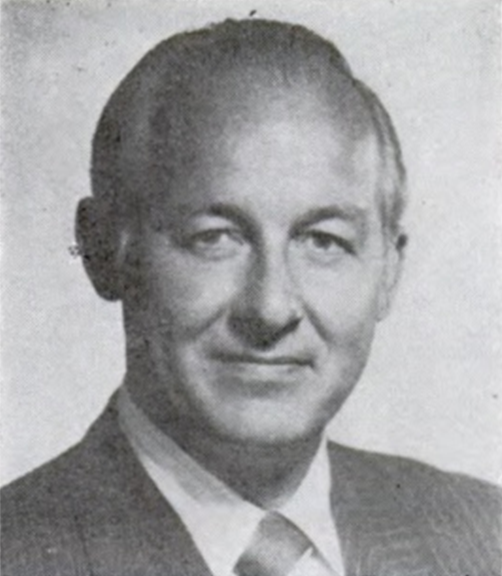
Republican leader
Bob Michel

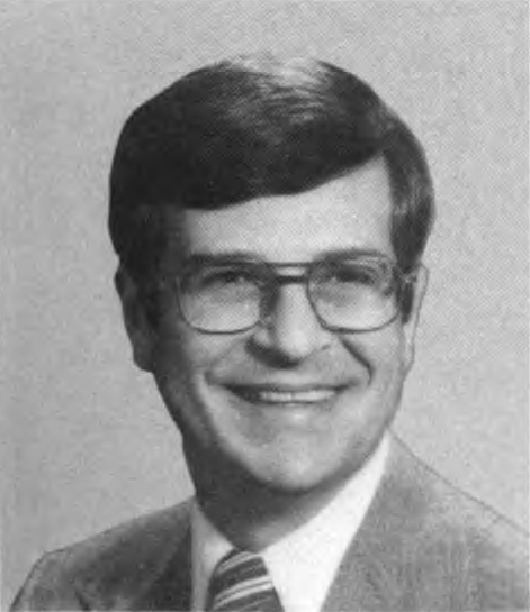
Republican whip
Trent Lott

== Changes in membership ==
=== Senate ===
Senate changes
State (class)	Vacated by	Reason for change	Successor	Date of successor's formal installation (Note: When seated or oath administered, not necessarily when service began.)
Nebraska (1)	Edward Zorinsky (D)	Died March 6, 1987. Successor was appointed to finish the term.	David Karnes (R)	March 11, 1987

=== House of Representatives ===
House changes
District	Vacated by	Reason for change	Successor	Date of successor's formal installation
California's 5th	Sala Burton (D)	Died February 1, 1987	Nancy Pelosi (D)	June 2, 1987
Connecticut's 4th	Stewart McKinney (R)	Died May 7, 1987	Chris Shays (R)	August 18, 1987
Tennessee's 5th	Bill Boner (D)	Resigned October 5, 1987	Bob Clement (D)	January 19, 1988
Virginia's 5th	Dan Daniel (D)	Died January 23, 1988	Lewis F. Payne Jr. (D)	June 14, 1988
Louisiana's 4th	Buddy Roemer (D)	Resigned March 14, 1988, after being elected Governor of Louisiana	Jim McCrery (R)	April 16, 1988
New Jersey's 3rd	James J. Howard (D)	Died March 25, 1988	Frank Pallone (D)	November 8, 1988
Illinois's 21st	Melvin Price (D)	Died April 22, 1988	Jerry Costello (D)	August 9, 1988
Tennessee's 2nd	John Duncan Sr. (R)	Died June 21, 1988	Jimmy Duncan (R)	November 8, 1988
New York's 19th	Mario Biaggi (D)	Resigned August 5, 1988	Vacant to the end of this Congress	
American Samoa's at-large	Fofó I. F. Sunia (D)	Resigned September 6, 1988	Vacant to the end of this Congress	
Alabama's 3rd	Bill Nichols (D)	Died December 13, 1988	Vacant to the end of this Congress	

== Committees ==
Lists of committees and their party leaders for members of the House and Senate committees can be found through the Official Congressional Directory at the bottom of this article. The directory after the pages of terms of service lists committees of the Senate, House (Standing with Subcommittees, Select and Special) and Joint and, after that, House/Senate committee assignments. On the committees section of the House and Senate in the Official Congressional Directory, the committee's members on the first row on the left side shows the chairman of the committee and on the right side shows the ranking member of the committee.

=== Senate ===
- Aging (Special) (Chair: John Melcher)
- Agriculture, Nutrition and Forestry (Chair: Patrick Leahy; Ranking Member: Richard G. Lugar)
  - Agricultural Credit (Chair: David L. Boren; Ranking Member: Rudy Boschwitz)
  - Agricultural Production and Stabilization of Prices (Chair: John Melcher; Ranking Member: Jesse Helms)
  - Agricultural Research and General Legislation (Chair: Kent Conrad; Ranking Member: Pete Wilson)
  - Domestic, Foreign Marketing and Product Promotion (Chair: David Pryor; Ranking Member: Thad Cochran)
  - Nutrition and Investigations (Chair: Tom Harkin; Ranking Member: Bob Dole)
  - Rural Development and Rural Electrification (Chair: Howell Heflin; Ranking Member: Mitch McConnell)
- Appropriations (Chair: John C. Stennis; Ranking Member: Mark O. Hatfield)
  - Agriculture, Rural Development and Related Agencies (Chair: Quentin N. Burdick; Ranking Member: Thad Cochran)
  - Commerce, Justice, State, Judiciary and Related Agencies (Chair: Ernest Hollings; Ranking Member: Warren Rudman)
  - Defense (Chair: John Stennis; Ranking Member: Ted Stevens)
  - District of Columbia (Chair: Tom Harkin; Ranking Member: Don Nickles)
  - Energy and Water Development (Chair: J. Bennett Johnston; Ranking Member: Mark O. Hatfield)
  - Foreign Operations (Chair: Daniel Inouye; Ranking Member: Bob Kasten)
  - HUD-Independent Agencies (Chair: William Proxmire; Ranking Member: Jake Garn)
  - Interior and Related Agencies (Chair: Robert C. Byrd; Ranking Member: James A. McClure)
  - Labor-Health, Human Services, Education and Related Agencies (Chair: Lawton Chiles; Ranking Member: Lowell P. Weicker)
  - Legislative Branch (Chair: Dale Bumpers; Ranking Member: Chuck Grassley)
  - Military Construction (Chair: Jim Sasser; Ranking Member: Arlen Specter)
  - Transportation and Related Agencies (Chair: Frank Lautenberg; Ranking Member: Al D'Amato)
  - Treasury, Postal Service and General Government (Chair: Dennis DeConcini; Ranking Member: Pete Domenici)
- Armed Services (Chair: Sam Nunn; Ranking Member: John W. Warner)
  - Conventional Forces and Alliance Defense (Chair: Carl Levin; Ranking Member: Dan Quayle)
  - Defense Industry and Technology (Chair: Jeff Bingaman; Ranking Member: Phil Gramm)
  - Manpower and Personnel (Chair: John Glenn; Ranking Member: Pete Wilson)
  - Projection Forces and Regional Defense (Chair: Ted Kennedy; Ranking Member: William S. Cohen)
  - Readiness, Sustainability and Support (Chair: Alan Dixon; Ranking Member: Gordon J. Humphrey)
  - Strategic Forces and Nuclear Detterence (Chair: J. James Exon; Ranking Member: Strom Thurmond)
- Banking, Housing and Urban Affairs (Chair: William Proxmire; Ranking Member: Jake Garn)
  - Consumer Affairs (Chair: Chris Dodd; Ranking Member: Phil Gramm)
  - Housing and Urban Affairs (Chair: Alan Cranston; Ranking Member: Al D'Amato)
  - International Finance and Monetary Policy (Chair: Paul Sarbanes; Ranking Member: H. John Heinz III)
  - Securities (Chair: Donald W. Riegle; Ranking Member: William L. Armstrong)
- Budget (Chair: Lawton Chiles; Ranking Member: Pete Domenici)
- Commerce, Science and Transportation (Chair: Ernest Hollings; Ranking Member: John C. Danforth)
  - Aviation (Chair: Wendell H. Ford; Ranking Member: Nancy Kassebaum)
  - Communications (Chair: Daniel Inouye; Ranking Member: Bob Packwood)
  - Consumer (Chair: Al Gore; Ranking Member: John McCain)
  - Foreign Commerce and Tourism (Chair: Jay Rockefeller; Ranking Member: Paul S. Trible Jr.)
  - Merchant Marine (Chair: John Breaux; Ranking Member: Ted Stevens)
  - Science, Technology and Space (Chair: Donald W. Riegle; Ranking Member: Larry Pressler)
  - Surface Transportation (Chair: J. James Exon; Ranking Member: Bob Kasten)
  - National Ocean Policy Study (Chair: Ernest Hollings; Ranking Member: John C. Danforth)
- Energy and Natural Resources (Chair: J. Bennett Johnston; Ranking Member: James A. McClure)
  - Energy Regulation and Conservation (Chair: Howard M. Metzenbaum; Ranking Member: Don Nickles)
  - Natural Resources Development and Production (Chair: John Melcher; Ranking Member: Chic Hecht)
  - Public Lands, National Parks and Forests (Chair: Dale Bumpers; Ranking Member: Malcolm Wallop)
  - Research and Development (Chair: Wendell H. Ford; Ranking Member: Pete Domenici)
  - Water and Power (Chair: Bill Bradley; Ranking Member: Daniel J. Evans)
- Environment and Public Works (Chair: Quentin N. Burdick; Ranking Member: Robert T. Stafford)
  - Environmental Protection (Chair: George J. Mitchell; Ranking Member: John H. Chafee)
  - Hazardous Wastes and Toxic Substances (Chair: Max Baucus; Ranking Member: David Durenberger)
  - Nuclear Regulation (Chair: John Breaux; Ranking Member: Alan K. Simpson)
  - Superfund and Environmental Oversight (Chair: Frank Lautenberg; Ranking Member: John W. Warner)
  - Water Resources, Transportation and Infrastructure (Chair: Daniel Moynihan; Ranking Member: Steve Symms)
- Ethics (Select) (Chair: Howell Heflin; Vice Chair: Warren Rudman)
- Finance (Chair: Lloyd Bentsen; Ranking Member: Bob Packwood)
  - Energy and Agricultural Taxation (Chair: David L. Boren; Ranking Member: Malcolm Wallop)
  - Health (Chair: George J. Mitchell; Ranking Member: David Durenberger)
  - International Debt (Chair: Bill Bradley; Ranking Member: William V. Roth Jr.)
  - International Trade (Chair: Spark Matsunaga; Ranking Member: John C. Danforth)
  - Private Retirement Plans and Oversight of the Internal Revenue Service (Chair: David Pryor; Ranking Member: H. John Heinz III)
  - Social Security and Family Policy (Chair: Daniel Moynihan; Ranking Member: Bob Dole)
  - Taxation and Debt Management (Chair: Max Baucus; Ranking Member: John H. Chafee)
- Foreign Relations (Chair: Claiborne Pell; Ranking Member: Jesse Helms)
  - African Affairs (Chair: Paul Simon; Ranking Member: Nancy Kassebaum)
  - East Asian and Pacific Affairs (Chair: Alan Cranston; Ranking Member: Frank H. Murkowski)
  - European Affairs (Chair: Joe Biden; Ranking Member: Daniel J. Evans)
  - International Economic Policy, Trade, Oceans and Environment (Chair: John Kerry; Ranking Member: Rudy Boschwitz)
  - Near Eastern and South Asian Affairs (Chair: Paul Sarbanes; Ranking Member: Rudy Boschwitz)
  - Terrorism, Narcotics and International Communications (Chair: Brock Adams; Ranking Member: Mitch McConnell)
  - Western Hemisphere and Peace Corps Affairs (Chair: Chris Dodd; Ranking Member: Richard G. Lugar)
- Governmental Affairs (Chair: John Glenn; Ranking Member: William V. Roth Jr.)
  - Federal Services, Post Office and Civil Service (Chair: David Pryor; Ranking Member: Ted Stevens)
  - Federal Spending, Budget and Accounting (Chair: Lawton Chiles; Ranking Member: Warren Rudman)
  - Energy, Nuclear Proliferation and Federal Services (Chair: Jim Sasser; Ranking Member: N/A)
  - Government Efficiency, Federalism and the District of Columbia (Chair: Jim Sasser; Ranking Member: H. John Heinz III)
  - Oversight of Government Management (Chair: Carl Levin; Ranking Member: William S. Cohen)
  - Investigations (Chair: Carl Levin; Ranking Member: N/A)
- Indian Affairs (Select) (Chair: Daniel Inouye)
- Judiciary (Chair: Joe Biden; Ranking Member: Strom Thurmond)
  - Antitrust, Monopolies and Business Rights (Chair: Howard M. Metzenbaum; Ranking Member: Strom Thurmond)
  - Constitution (Chair: Paul Simon; Ranking Member: Arlen Specter)
  - Courts and Administration Practice (Chair: Howell Heflin; Ranking Member: Chuck Grassley)
  - Immigration and Refugee Affairs (Chair: Ted Kennedy; Ranking Member: Alan K. Simpson)
  - Patents, Copyrights and Trademarks (Chair: Dennis DeConcini; Ranking Member: Orrin Hatch)
  - Technology and the Law (Chair: Patrick Leahy; Ranking Member: Gordon J. Humphrey)
- Intelligence (Select) (Chair: David L. Boren; Vice Chair: William S. Cohen)
- Labor and Human Resources (Chair: Ted Kennedy; Ranking Member: Orrin Hatch)
  - Aging (Chair: Spark Matsunaga; Ranking Member: Thad Cochran)
  - Children, Family, Drugs and Alcoholism (Chair: Chris Dodd; Ranking Member: Strom Thurmond)
  - Education, Arts and Humanities (Chair: Claiborne Pell; Ranking Member: Robert T. Stafford)
  - Employment and Productivity (Chair: Paul Simon; Ranking Member: Gordon J. Humphrey)
  - Handicapped (Chair: Tom Harkin; Ranking Member: Lowell P. Weicker)
  - Labor (Chair: Howard M. Metzenbaum; Ranking Member: Dan Quayle)
- Nutrition and Human Needs (Select) (Chair: [data missing])
- Rules and Administration (Chair: Wendell H. Ford; Ranking Member: Ted Stevens)
- Small Business (Chair: Dale Bumpers; Ranking Member: Lowell P. Weicker)
  - Competition and Antitrust Enforcement (Chair: Tom Harkin; Ranking Member: Malcolm Wallop)
  - Export Expansion (Chair: Jim Sasser; Ranking Member: Rudy Boschwitz)
  - Government Contracting and Paperwork Reduction (Chair: Alan Dixon; Ranking Member: Bob Kasten)
  - Innovation, Technology and Productivity (Chair: Carl Levin; Ranking Member: Warren B. Rudman)
  - Export Promotion and Market Development (Chair: Jim Sasser)
  - Rural Economy and Family Farming (Chair: Max Baucus; Ranking Member: Al D'Amato)
  - Urban and Minority-Owned Business Development (Chair: John Kerry; Ranking Member: Kit Bond)
- Secret Military Assistance to Iran and the Nicaraguan Opposition (Select) (Chair: Daniel Inouye; Vice Chair: Warren Rudman)
- Veterans' Affairs (Chairman: Alan Cranston; Ranking Member: Frank H. Murkowski)
- Whole

=== House of Representatives ===
- Aging (Select) (Chair: Edward Roybal; Ranking Member: Matthew J. Rinaldo)
- Agriculture (Chair: Kika de la Garza; Ranking Member: Edward Madigan)
  - Conservation, Credit and Rural Development (Chair: Ed Jones; Ranking Member: E. Thomas Coleman)
  - Cotton, Rice and Sugar (Chair: Jerry Huckaby; Ranking Member: Arlan Stangeland)
  - Department Operations, Research and Foreign Agriculture (Chair: George E. Brown Jr.; Ranking Member: Pat Roberts)
  - Domestic Marketing, Consumer Relations and Nutrition (Chair: Leon Panetta; Ranking Member: Bill Emerson)
  - Forests, Family Farms and Energy (Chair: Harold Volkmer; Ranking Member: Sid Morrison)
  - Livestock, Dairy and Poultry (Chair: Charles Stenholm; Ranking Member: Jim Jeffords)
  - Tobacco and Peanuts (Chair: Charlie Rose; Ranking Member: Larry J. Hopkins)
  - Wheat, Soybeans and Feed Grains (Chair: Dan Glickman; Ranking Member: Ron Marlenee)
- Appropriations (Chair: Jamie L. Whitten; Ranking Member: Silvio O. Conte)
  - Commerce, Justice, State and the Judiciary (Chair: Neal Edward Smith; Ranking Member: Hal Rogers)
  - Defense (Chair: William V. Chappell; Ranking Member: Joseph M. McDade)
  - District of Columbia (Chair: Julian C. Dixon; Ranking Member: Lawrence Coughlin)
  - Energy and Water Development (Chair: Tom Bevill)
  - Foreign Operations (Chair: David Obey; Ranking Member: John T. Myers)
  - HUD-Independent Agencies (Chair: Edward P. Boland; Ranking Member: Mickey Edwards)
  - Interior and Related Agencies (Chair: Sidney Yates; Ranking Member: Bill Green)
  - Labor-Health and Human Services, Education and Related Agencies (Chair: William H. Natcher; Ranking Member: Ralph Regula)
  - Legislative (Chair: Victor Fazio; Ranking Member: Jerry Lewis)
  - Military Construction (Chair: Bill Hefner; Ranking Member: Bill Lowery)
  - Agriculture, Rural Development and Related Agencies (Chair: Jamie Whitten; Ranking Member: Virginia Smith)
  - Transportation and Related Agencies (Chair: William Lehman; Ranking Member: Lawrence Coughlin)
  - Treasury, Postal Service and General Government (Chair: Edward Roybal; Ranking Member: Joe Skeen)
- Armed Services (Chair: Les Aspin; Ranking Member: William L. Dickinson)
  - Investigations (Chair: Bill Nichols; Ranking Member: Larry J. Hopkins)
  - Military Installations and Facilities (Chair: Ron Dellums; Ranking Member: David O'B. Martin)
  - Military Personnel and Compensation (Chair: Beverly Byron; Ranking Member: Herbert H. Bateman)
  - Procurement and Military Nuclear Systems (Chair: Samuel S. Stratton; Ranking Member: Robert E. Badham)
  - Readiness (Chair: Dan Daniel; Ranking Member: John R. Kasich)
  - Research and Development (Chair: Charles Melvin Price; Ranking Member: William L. Dickinson)
  - Seapower, Strategic and Critical Materials (Chair: Charles E. Bennett; Ranking Member: Floyd Spence)
  - Acquisition Policy Panel (Chair: Nicholas Mavroules; Ranking Member: Jim Courter)
  - Defense Policy Panel (Chair: Les Aspin; Ranking Member: William L. Dickinson)
- Banking, Finance and Urban Affairs (Chair: Fernand St. Germain; Ranking Member: Chalmers P. Wylie)
  - Consumer Affairs and Coinage (Chair: Frank Annunzio; Ranking Member: John P. Hiler)
  - Domestic Monetary Policy (Chair: Stephen L. Neal; Ranking Member: Bill McCollum)
  - Economic Stabilization (Chair: Mary Rose Oakar; Ranking Member: Norman D. Shumway)
  - Financial Institutions Supervision, Regulation and Insurance (Chair: Fernand St. Germain; Ranking Member: Stanford Parris)
  - General Oversight and Investigations (Chair: Carroll Hubbard; Ranking Member: Stanford Parris)
  - Housing and Community Development (Chair: Henry B. Gonzalez; Ranking Member: Chalmers P. Wylie)
  - International Development Institutions and Finance (Chair: Walter E. Fauntroy; Ranking Member: Doug Bereuter)
  - International Finance, Trade and Monetary Policy (Chair: Robert Garcia; Ranking Member: Jim Leach)
- Budget (Chair: William H. Gray; Ranking Member: Del Latta)
  - Budget Process (Chair: Butler Derrick; Ranking Member: Willis D. Gradison Jr.)
  - Community and Natural Resources (Chair: Howard Wolpe; Ranking Member: Mickey Edwards)
  - Defense and International Affairs (Chair: Vic Fazio; Ranking Member: Del Latta)
  - Economic and Trade Policy (Chair: Mike Lowry; Ranking Member: Beau Boulter)
  - Health (Chair: Martin Frost; Ranking Member: Nancy Johnson)
  - Human Resources (Chair: Pat Williams; Ranking Member: Bill Goodling)
  - Income Security (Chair: Marty Russo; Ranking Member: Connie Mack III)
  - State and Local Government (Chair: George Miller; Ranking Member: Denny Smith)
- Children, Youth and Families (Select) (Chair: George Miller; Ranking Member: Dan Coats)
- District of Columbia (Chair: Ron Dellums; Ranking Member: Stanford Parris)
  - Fiscal Affairs and Health (Chair: Walter E. Fauntroy; Ranking Member: Stanford Parris)
  - Government Operations and Metropolitan Affairs (Chair: Alan Wheat; Ranking Member: Larry Combest)
  - Judiciary and Education (Chair: Mervyn M. Dymally; Ranking Member: Thomas J. Bliley Jr.)
- Education and Labor (Chair: Augustus F. Hawkins; Ranking Member: Jim Jeffords)
  - Elementary, Secondary and Vocational Education (Chair: Augustus F. Hawkins; Ranking Member: Jim Jeffords)
  - Employment Opportunities (Chair: Matthew G. Martinez; Ranking Member: Bill Goodling)
  - Health and Safety (Chair: Joseph M. Gaydos; Ranking Member: Paul B. Henry)
  - Labor-Management Relations (Chair: Bill Clay; Ranking Member: Marge Roukema)
  - Labor Standards (Chair: Austin J. Murphy; Ranking Member: Tom Petri)
  - Human Resources (Chair: Dale Kildee; Ranking Member: Tom Tauke)
  - Postsecondary Education (Chair: Pat Williams; Ranking Member: E. Thomas Coleman)
  - Select Education (Chair: Major R. Owens; Ranking Member: Steve Bartlett)
- Energy and Commerce (Chair: John Dingell; Ranking Member: Norman F. Lent)
  - Commerce, Transportation and Tourism (Chair: James J. Florio; Ranking Member: William E. Dannemeyer)
  - Energy and Power (Chair: Phil Sharp; Ranking Member: Carlos J. Moorhead)
  - Health and the Environment (Chair: Henry Waxman; Ranking Member: Edward R. Madigan)
  - Oversight and Investigations (Chair: John Dingell; Ranking Member: Norman F. Lent)
  - Telecommunications and Finance (Chair: Ed Markey; Ranking Member: Matthew J. Rinaldo)
  - Transportation, Tourism and Hazardous Materials (Chair: Tom Luken; Ranking Member: Bob Whittaker)
- Foreign Affairs (Chair: Dante Fascell; Ranking Member: William S. Broomfield)
  - Africa (Chair: Howard Wolpe; Ranking Member: Dan Burton)
  - Arms Control, International Security and Science (Chair: Dante Fascell; Ranking Member: William S. Broomfield)
  - Asian and Pacific Affairs (Chair: Stephen Solarz; Ranking Member: Jim Leach)
  - Europe and the Middle East (Chair: Lee H. Hamilton; Ranking Member: Benjamin A. Gilman)
  - Human Rights and International Organizations (Chair: Gus Yatron; Ranking Member: Gerald B.H. Solomon)
  - International Economic Policy and Trade (Chair: Don Bonker; Ranking Member: Toby Roth)
  - International Operations (Chair: Dan Mica; Ranking Member: Olympia Snowe)
  - Western Hemisphere Affairs (Chair: George W. Crockett; Ranking Member: Robert J. Lagomarsino)
- Government Operations (Chair: Jack Brooks; Ranking Member: Frank Horton)
  - Commerce, Consumer and Monetary Affairs (Chair: Doug Barnard; Ranking Member: Larry E. Craig)
  - Employment and Housing (Chair: Tom Lantos; Ranking Member: Joseph J. DioGuardi)
  - Environment, Energy and Natural Resources (Chair: Mike Synar; Ranking Member: William F. Clinger Jr.)
  - Government Activities and Transportation (Chair: Cardiss Collins; Ranking Member: Howard C. Nielson)
  - Government Information, Justice and Agriculture (Chair: Glenn English; Ranking Member: Al McCandless)
  - Human Resources and Ingovernmental Relations (Chair: Ted Weiss; Ranking Member: Jim Ross Lightfoot)
  - Legislation and National Security (Chair: Jack Brooks; Ranking Member: Frank Horton)
- House Administration (Chair: Frank Annunzio; Ranking Member: Bill Frenzel)
  - Accounts (Chair: Joseph M. Gaydos; Ranking Member: Robert E. Badham)
  - Elections (Chair: Al Swift; Ranking Member: Bill Thomas)
  - Libraries and Memorials (Chair: Mary Rose Oakar; Ranking Member: Newt Gingrich)
  - Office Systems (Chair: Charlie Rose; Ranking Member: Bill Thomas)
  - Personnel and Police (Chair: Leon E. Panetta; Ranking Member: Pat Roberts)
  - Procurement and Printing (Chair: Ed Jones; Ranking Member: Newt Gingrich)
  - Task Force on Legislative Service Organizations (Chair: Jim Bates; Ranking Member: Pat Roberts)
- Hunger (Select) (Chair: Mickey Leland; Ranking Member: Marge Roukema)
- Interior and Insular Affairs (Chair: Mo Udall; Ranking Member: Don Young)
  - Energy and the Environment (Chair: Morris K. Udall; Ranking Member: Manuel Lujan Jr.)
  - General Oversight, Northwest Power and Forest Management (Chair: Sam Gejdenson; Ranking Member: Denny Smith)
  - Insular and International Affairs (Chair: Ron de Lugo; Ranking Member: Robert J. Lagomarsino)
  - Mining and Natural Resources (Chair: Nick Rahall; Ranking Member: Larry E. Craig)
  - National Parks and Public Lands (Chair: Bruce Vento; Ranking Member: Ron Marlenee)
  - Water and Power Resources (Chair: George Miller; Ranking Member: Chip Pashayan Jr.)
- Investigate Covert Arms Transactions with Iran (Select) (Chair: Lee H. Hamilton; Ranking Member: Dick Cheney)
- Judiciary (Chair: Peter W. Rodino; Ranking Member: Hamilton Fish IV)
  - Administrative Law and Governmental Relations (Chair: Barney Frank; Ranking Member: E. Clay Shaw Jr.)
  - Civil and Constitutional Rights (Chair: Don Edwards; Ranking Member: James Sensenbrenner)
  - Courts, Civil Liberties and the Administration of Justice (Chair: Robert W. Kastenmeier; Ranking Member: Carlos J. Moorhead)
  - Crime (Chair: William J. Hughes; Ranking Member: Bill McCollum)
  - Criminal Justice (Chair: John Conyers; Ranking Member: George W. Gekas)
  - Immigration, Refugees and International Law (Chair: Romano L. Mazzoli; Ranking Member: Pat Swindall)
  - Monopolies and Commercial Law (Chair: Peter W. Rodino; Ranking Member: Hamilton Fish IV)
- Merchant Marine and Fisheries (Chair: Walter B. Jones Sr.; Ranking Member: Robert W. Davis)
  - Coast Guard and Navigation (Chair: Earl Hutto; Ranking Member: Robert W. Davis)
  - Fisheries, Wildlife Conservation and the Environment (Chair: Gerry Studds; Ranking Member: Don Young)
  - Merchant Marine (Chair: Mario Biaggi; Ranking Member: Norman F. Lent)
  - Oceanography (Chair: Mike Lowry; Ranking Member: Norman D. Shumway)
  - Oversight and Investigations (Chair: Walter B. Jones Sr.; Ranking Member: Claudine Schneider)
  - Panama Canal and Outer Continental Stuff (Chair: Billy Tauzin; Ranking Member: Jack Fields)
- Narcotics Abuse and Control (Select) (Chair: Charles B. Rangel; Ranking Member: Benjamin A. Gilman)
- Post Office and Civil Service (Chair: William D. Ford; Ranking Member: Gene Taylor)
  - Census and Population (Chair: Mervyn M. Dymally; Ranking Member: Connie Morella)
  - Civil Service (Chair: Patricia Schroeder; Ranking Member: Chip Pashayan)
  - Compensation and Employee Benefits (Chair: Gary Ackerman; Ranking Member: John T. Myers)
  - Human Resources (Chair: Gerry Sikorski; Ranking Member: Dan Burton)
  - Investigations (Chair: William D. Ford; Ranking Member: Gene Taylor)
  - Postal Operations and Services (Chair: Mickey Leland; Ranking Member: Frank Horton)
  - Postal Personnel and Modernization (Chair: Frank McCloskey; Ranking Member: Don Young)
- Public Works and Transportation (Chair: James J. Howard, then Glenn M. Anderson; Ranking Member: John Paul Hammerschmidt)
  - Aviation (Chair: Norman Y. Mineta; Ranking Member: Newt Gingrich)
  - Economic Development (Chair: Gus Savage; Ranking Member: E. Clay Shaw Jr.)
  - Investigations and Oversight (Chair: Jim Oberstar; Ranking Member: William F. Clinger Jr.)
  - Public Buildings and Grounds (Chair: Fofo I.F. Sunia; Ranking Member: Guy Molinari)
  - Surface Transportation (Chair: Glenn M. Anderson; Ranking Member: Bud Shuster)
  - Water Resources (Chair: Henry J. Nowak; Ranking Member: Arlan Stangeland)
- Rules (Chair: Claude Pepper; Ranking Member: Jimmy Quillen)
  - Rules of the House (Chair: Joe Moakley; Ranking Member: Gene Taylor)
  - The Legislative Process (Chair: Butler Derrick; Ranking Member: Trent Lott)
- Science and Technology (Chair: Robert A. Roe; Ranking Member: Manuel Lujan Jr.)
  - Energy Research and Development (Chair: Marilyn Lloyd; Ranking Member: Sid Morrison)
  - International Scientific Cooperation (Chair: Ralph M. Hall; Ranking Member: James Sensenbrenner)
  - Investigations and Oversight (Chair: Robert A. Roe; Ranking Member: Don Ritter)
  - Natural Resources, Agriculture Research and Environment (Chair: James H. Scheuer; Ranking Member: Claudine Schneider)
  - Science, Research and Technology (Chair: Doug Walgren; Ranking Member: Sherwood Boehlert)
  - Space Science and Applications (Chair: Bill Nelson; Ranking Member: Robert S. Walker)
  - Transportation, Aviation and Materials (Chair: Dave McCurdy; Ranking Member: Tom Luken)
- Small Business (Chair: John J. LaFalce; Ranking Member: Joseph M. McDade)
  - Antitrust, Impact of Deregulation and Privatization (Chair: Dennis E. Eckart; Ranking Member: John Hiler)
  - Energy and Agriculture (Chair: Charles Hatcher; Ranking Member: David Dreier)
  - Exports, Tourism and Special Problems (Chair: Ike Skelton; Ranking Member: Andy Ireland)
  - Procurement, Innovation and Minority Enterprise Development (Chair: Nicholas Mavroules; Ranking Member: Silvio O. Conte)
  - Regulation and Business Opportunities (Chair: Ron Wyden; Ranking Member: William S. Broomfield)
  - SBA and the General Economy (Chair: John J. LaFalce; Ranking Member: Joseph M. McDade)
- Standards of Official Conduct (Chair: Julian C. Dixon; Ranking Member: Floyd Spence)
- Veterans' Affairs (Chair: Gillespie V. Montgomery; Ranking Member: Gerald B.H. Solomon)
  - Hospitals and Health Care (Chair: Gillespie V. Montgomery; Ranking Member: John Paul Hammerschmidt)
  - Compensation, Pension and Insurance (Chair: Douglas Applegate; Ranking Member: Bill McCollum)
  - Education, Training and Employment (Chair: Wayne Dowdy; Ranking Member: Chris Smith)
  - Oversight and Investigations (Chair: Lane Evans; Ranking Member: Bob Stump)
  - Housing and Memorial Affairs (Chair: Marcy Kaptur; Ranking Member: Dan Burton)
- Ways and Means (Chair: Dan Rostenkowski; Ranking Member: John J. Duncan)
  - Health (Chair: Pete Stark; Ranking Member: Willis D. Gradison Jr.)
  - Oversight (Chair: J.J. Pickle; Ranking Member: Richard T. Schulze)
  - Public Assistance and Unemployment Compensation (Chair: Thomas J. Downey; Ranking Member: Hank Brown)
  - Select Revenue Measures (Chair: Charles Rangel; Ranking Member: Guy Vander Jagt)
  - Social Security (Chair: Andrew Jacobs Jr.; Ranking Member: Bill Archer)
  - Trade (Chair: Sam Gibbons; Ranking Member: Phil Crane)
- Whole

=== Joint committees ===
- Deficit Reduction
- Economic (Chair: Sen. Paul Sarbanes; Vice Chair: Rep. Lee H. Hamilton)
- Taxation (Chair: Rep. Dan Rostenkowski; Vice Chair: Sen. Lloyd Bentsen)
- The Library (Chair: Sen. Claiborne Pell; Vice Chair: Rep. Frank Annunzio)
- Printing (Chair: Rep. Frank Annunzio; Vice Chair: Sen. Wendell Ford)

== Employees ==
=== Legislative branch agency directors ===
- Architect of the Capitol: George Malcolm White
- Attending Physician of the United States Congress: William Narva
- Comptroller General of the United States: Charles A. Bowsher
- Director of the Congressional Budget Office: Rudolph G. Penner, until April 28, 1987
  - Edward Gramlich, April 28, 1987–December 1987
  - James L. Blum Jr. (acting), starting December 1987
- Librarian of Congress: Daniel J. Boorstin, until September 12, 1987
  - James H. Billington, from September 14, 1987
- Public Printer of the United States: Ralph E. Kennickell Jr., until 1988
  - Joseph E. Jenifer, from 1988

=== Senate ===
- Secretary: Walter J. Stewart
- Librarian: Roger K. Haley
- Secretary for the Majority: C. Abbott Saffold
- Secretary for the Minority: Howard O. Greene Jr.
- Sergeant at Arms: Henry K. Giugni
- Parliamentarian: Alan Frumin
- Curator: James R. Ketchum
- Historian: Richard A. Baker
- Chaplain: Richard C. Halverson (Presbyterian)

=== House of Representatives ===
- Clerk: Donnald K. Anderson
- Sergeant at Arms: Jack Russ
- Doorkeeper: James T. Molloy
- Parliamentarian: William Holmes Brown
- Postmaster: Robert V. Rota
- Reading Clerks:
  - Meg Goetz (D)
  - Bob Berry (until 1987) (R), Paul Hays (starting 1988) (R)
- Historian: Ray Smock
- Chaplain: James D. Ford (Lutheran)
- See also: Rules of the House: "Other officers and officials"

== See also ==
- List of new members of the 100th United States Congress
- 1986 United States elections (elections leading to this Congress)
  - 1986 United States Senate elections
  - 1986 United States House of Representatives elections
- 1988 United States elections (elections during this Congress, leading to the next Congress)
  - 1988 United States presidential election
  - 1988 United States Senate elections
  - 1988 United States House of Representatives elections
