= Genocide Convention Implementation Act =

Genocide Convention Implementation Act of 1987
- Long title: A bill to implement the International Convention on the Prevention and Punishment of Genocide
- Nicknames: Proxmire Act
- Enacted by: the 100th United States Congress

Citations
- Public law: Pub. L. 100–606
- Statutes at Large: 102 Stat. 3045

Codification
- Titles amended: 18 U.S.C.: Crimes and Criminal Procedure
- U.S.C. sections created: 18 U.S.C. § 1091

Legislative history
- Introduced in the Senate as S. 1851 by Joseph R. Biden, Jr. (D-DE) on November 5, 1987; Committee consideration by Senate Judiciary; Passed the Senate on October 14, 1988 (voice vote); Passed the House on October 19, 1988 (voice vote); Signed into law by President Ronald Reagan on November 4, 1988

The Genocide Convention Implementation Act of 1987 (Proxmire Act) amended the US Federal criminal code to establish the criminal offense of genocide (specified acts committed with the specific intent to destroy a national, ethnic, racial, or religious group). It provides for penalties to be imposed upon anyone who commits or attempts to commit any of such acts (a fine of $1,000,000 and/or imprisonment for up to 20 years, and life imprisonment if group members are killed). It also provides for criminal penalties (a fine of $500,000 and/or imprisonment for up to five years) for directly and publicly inciting an act of genocide.

This statute says that it shall not be construed to: (1) preclude the application of State or local laws to the conduct proscribed; or (2) create any substantive or procedural right enforceable by law by any party in any proceeding.

The Genocide Convention of 1948, which this 1987 statute implemented, forbids "acts committed with intent to destroy, in whole or in part, a national, ethnical, racial or religious group, as such", and then lists those particular acts. The 1987 statute clarified that the words "in part" mean "in substantial part" and furthermore explained that:

[T]he term 'substantial part' means a part of a group of such numerical significance that the destruction or loss of that part would cause the destruction of the group as a viable entity within the nation of which such group is a part."

This 1987 statute paved the way for the United States to ratify the Genocide Convention of 1948 the following year, although the U.S. (like many other countries) attached reservations and understandings to its ratification, including understandings to conform with this federal implementing statute. Accordingly, in 2007, the International Court of Justice has recognized such principles which are embodied in the U.S. implementing statute:

In the first place, the intent must be to destroy at least a substantial part of the particular group. That is demanded by the very nature of the crime of genocide: since the object and purpose of the Convention as a whole is to prevent the intentional destruction of groups, the part targeted must be significant enough to have an impact on the group as a whole.

As of 2026, no one has been indicted for violations of the act.
