= Computer Security Act of 1987 =

U.S. federal law

- Long title: An Act to provide for a computer standards program within the National Bureau of Standards, to provide for Government-wide computer security, and to provide for the training in security matters of persons who are involved in the management, operation, and use of Federal computer systems, and for other purposes.
- Acronyms (colloquial): CSA
- Enacted by: the 100th United States Congress
- Effective: January 8, 1988

Citations
- Public law: 100-235
- Statutes at Large: 101 Stat. 1724

Codification
- Titles amended: 15 U.S.C.: Commerce and Trade
- U.S.C. sections amended: 15 U.S.C. ch. 7 § 271 et seq.; 15 U.S.C. ch. 7 § 278g-3; 15 U.S.C. ch. 7 § 278h

Legislative history
- Introduced in the House as H.R. 145 by Dan Glickman (D-KS) on January 6, 1987; Committee consideration by House Government Operations, House Science, Space and Technology; Passed the House on June 22, 1987 (passed voice vote); Passed the Senate on December 21, 1987 (passed voice vote); Signed into law by President Ronald Reagan on January 8, 1988

The Computer Security Act of 1987, Public Law No. 100-235 (H.R. 145), (Jan. 8, 1988), is a United States federal law enacted in 1987. It is intended to improve the security and privacy of sensitive information in federal computer systems and to establish minimally acceptable security practices for such systems. It requires the creation of computer security plans, and appropriate training of system users or owners where the systems would display, process or store sensitive information.

== Provisions ==
- Assigned the National Institute of Standards and Technology (NIST, at the time named National Bureau of Standards) to develop standards of minimum acceptable practices with the help of the NSA
- Requires establishment of security policies for Federal computer systems that contain sensitive information.
- Mandatory security awareness training for federal employees that use those systems.
