= Helms AIDS Amendments =

1987 amendments to US Congressional bills restricting funding for HIV/AIDS education

The Helms AIDS Amendments were a series of amendments to United States Congressional bills that US Senator Jesse Helms introduced, starting in 1987, that prohibited the use of federal funding for any HIV/AIDS educational materials that would "promote or encourage, directly or indirectly, homosexual activities". Helms introduced the first and best-known of these amendments in 1987 to an AIDS appropriations bill, but also continued to offer the same amendment to subsequent appropriations bills.

The 1987 bill, with the Helms amendment attached, passed the Senate by a 94–2 vote, and the House of Representatives 358–47. President Ronald Reagan was an enthusiastic supporter of the amendment and signed the amended bill into law.

== Background ==
In the early days of the AIDS crisis in the United States, a non-profit group called the Gay Men's Health Crisis was publishing and distributing pamphlets as part of their efforts to educate the public about AIDS. In October 1987, Senator Helms walked into the Oval Office carrying a GMHC pamphlet that he wanted to show President Reagan. The pamphlet was part of GMHC's Safer Sex Comix series and featured two gay men that had safe sex after a gym workout. One caption read: "What happens when Ed, all-star jock stud, meets dark pumpboy, Julio? After the gym, the real workout starts."

Helms showed the book to Reagan, who "looked at a couple of pages, closed it up and shook his head, and hit his desk with his fist." Helms also informed the president that GMHC had received over $600,000 in federal funds, but did not mention that GMHC carefully segregated its funding into public and private activities. Public money went to activities acceptable to the government, while more controversial projects, such as the Safer Sex Comix series, were paid for by money from private sources.

== Passage ==
Knowing he had Reagan's support, Helms delivered a Senate speech on October 14, 1987, in which he proclaimed, "Every Christian ethic cries out for me to do something." Helms attached an amendment to the spending bill barring the CDC from using funds for anti-AIDS campaigns that "promote or encourage, directly or indirectly, homosexual activities."

The amended spending bill passed in the Senate by a 94 to 2 vote. Many senators, having already voted for the spending bill without the amendment, did not change their votes because they did not want to risk being portrayed by Helms as being in favor of homosexuality. The bill passed the House by a similarly lopsided margin of 358–47.

== Legacy ==
As late as 2002, Helms continued to claim that the "homosexual lifestyle" was the cause of the spread of AIDS in the United States, and he remained opposed to spending money on AIDS research.

== See also ==
- AIDS amendments of 1988
