= AIDS amendments of 1988 =

US law

- Other short titles: Food and Drug Administration Act of 1988; Health Professions Reauthorization Act of 1988; National Commission on Acquired Immune Deficiency Syndrome Act; National Institute on Deafness and Other Communication Disorders and Health Research Extension Act of 1988; Nursing Shortage Reduction and Education Extension Act of 1988; Organ Transplant Amendments Act of 1988; Prison Testing Act of 1988
- Long title: An Act to amend the Public Health Service Act to establish certain health programs, to revise and extend certain health programs, and for other purposes.
- Acronyms (colloquial): HOPE
- Nicknames: Health Omnibus Extension of 1988
- Enacted by: the 100th United States Congress
- Effective: November 4, 1988

Citations
- Public law: Pub. L. 100–607
- Statutes at Large: 102 Stat. 3048 aka 102 Stat. 3062

Codification
- Acts amended: Public Health Service Act
- Titles amended: 42 U.S.C.: Public Health and Social Welfare
- U.S.C. sections amended: 42 U.S.C. ch. 6A, subch. XXI § 300cc et seq.; 42 U.S.C. ch. 6A, subch. XXII § 300dd et seq.; 42 U.S.C. ch. 6A, subch. XXIII § 300ee et seq.

Legislative history
- Introduced in the Senate as S. 2889 by Edward M. Kennedy (D-MA) on October 13, 1988; Passed the Senate on October 13, 1988 (passed voice vote); Passed the House on October 13, 1988 (passed voice vote); Signed into law by President Ronald Reagan on November 4, 1988

AIDS amendments of 1988, better known as the Health Omnibus Programs Extension (HOPE) Act of 1988, is a United States statute amending the Public Health Service Act. The Acquired Immune Deficiency Syndrome amendments were compiled as Title II - Programs with Respect to Acquired Immune Deficiency Syndrome within the HOPE Act of 1988. The Title II Act appropriated federal funding for Acquired Immune Deficiency Syndrome (AIDS) education, prevention, research, and testing. The U.S. legislative title provisioned the establishment of the presidentially appointed National Commission on AIDS. The S. 2889 legislation was passed by the 100th U.S. Congressional session and signed by President Ronald Reagan on November 4, 1988.

== History ==
The Acquired Immune Deficiency Syndrome was officially recognized on June 5, 1981, when the U.S. Centers for Disease Control and Prevention (CDC) published a clinical article in the CDC's Morbidity and Mortality Weekly Report. The CDC article acknowledged five young males in the Los Angeles, California, area who were infected with the cytomegalovirus and an infrequent form of Pneumocystis Carinii Pneumonia (PCP).

On July 3, 1981, The New York Times published a report concerning forty-one males with scarce cases of Kaposi's sarcoma in California and New York. By the close of 1981, there had been two hundred and seventy cases of severe immune deficiency cases in males across the United States. Of the two hundred and seventy cases, one hundred and twenty-one of those cases resulted in mortality rates in the United States.

On April 13, 1982, the first U.S. congressional hearings were conducted on the Acquired Immune Deficiency Syndrome by U.S. Representative Henry Waxman. By September, U.S. Representatives Phillip Burton and Henry Waxman provided U.S. legislation to fund five million for opportunistic infection surveillance by the Centers for Disease Control and Prevention and ten million for Acquired Immune Deficiency Syndrome research by the National Institutes of Health.

The 1982 U.S. Congressional deliberations concluded on December 17, 1982, when the 97th Congressional session passed the Orphan Drug Act of 1983.

== Provisions of the Amendments ==
The AIDS amendments established policy for five primary elements with respect to the Acquired Immune Deficiency Syndrome.

=== Subtitle A: Research Programs ===
Title XXIII - Research with respect to Acquired Immune Deficiency Syndrome established surveyable protocols for clinical research, clinical toxicology, and therapeutic drug monitoring.

Research programs established by Title II - Programs with Respect to Acquired Immune Deficiency Syndrome
- Establishment of clinical research review committee
- Establishment of clinical evaluation units at the National Institute of Health
- Use of investigational new drugs with respect to the Acquired Immune Deficiency Syndrome
- Community based evaluations of experimental therapies including private industry and Schools of Medicine
- Evaluation of certain treatments regarding effectiveness and risks of foregoing treatments with respect to the Acquired Immune Deficiency Syndrome
- Provision for international support including the global strategy of the Pan American Health Organization and World Health Organization Special Programme on Acquired Immune Deficiency Syndrome
- Establishment of research centers by public and nonprofit research entities

- Research center information services

(a.) Toll-free telephone communications for health care entities
(b.) Data bank on research information
(c.) Data bank on clinical trials and treatments
(d.) Requirements regarding data bank research information

- Development of model protocols for clinical care of infected individuals
- Establishment of National Blood Resource Education Program
- Establishment of research training including fellowships and programs conducted by the National Institute of Mental Health

=== Subtitle B: Health Services ===
Title XXIV - Health services with respect to Acquired Immune Deficiency Syndrome is composed of three segments providing preventive medicine protocols for opportunistic infections.

Part A - Formula Grants to States for Home and Community-Based Health Services
- Establishment of program

- Allotments for states

- Purpose of grants

- Eligible Individual - an individual infected with the etiologic agent for the Acquired Immune Deficiency Syndrome being medically dependent or chronically dependent.

(A.) Medically Dependent, with respect to an individual, has been certified by a physician attesting routine use of appropriate medical services including home intravenous drug therapy to prevent the individual's deterioration of physical health or cognitive function due to infection from the etiologic agent of the Acquired Immune Deficiency Syndrome.
(B.) Individual is adept to avoid long-term or frequent inpatient care at a hospital, nursing facility, or other institution if home and community-based health services are provided to individual.
(A.) Chronically Dependent, with respect to an individual, has been certified by a physician attesting the inability to perform due to physical or cognitive impairment including two daily living tasks being bathing, dressing, toileting, transferring, and eating due to infection from the etiologic agent of the Acquired Immune Deficiency Syndrome.
(B.) Individual having similar level of disability due to cognitive impairment as defined by the Secretary.

- Home and Community-Based Health Services - with respect to an eligible individual, skilled health services provided in the individual's home pursuant a written plan of care by a health care professional for health management provisions as described;

(A) durable medical equipment
(B) homemaker or home health aide services and personal care services provided in the individual's home
(C) day treatment or other partial hospitalization services
(D) home intravenous drug therapy including prescription drugs administered intravenously as part of such palliative care
(E) routine diagnostic tests administered in the individual's home

Part B - Subacute Care
- Subacute Care - medical and health care services which are required for individuals recovering from acute care episodes that are less intensive than the level of care provided in acute care hospitals, skilled nursing care, hospice care, and other health services provided in long-term facilities.
Part C - Counseling and Testing
- Grants for anonymous testing
- Requirement of provision for certain counseling services

- Counseling before testing
- Counseling of individuals with negative test results
- Counseling of individuals with positive test results
- Rule of construction with respect to counseling without testing

- Prevention demonstration projects for individuals with positive test results

=== Subtitle C: Prevention ===
Title XV - Prevention of Acquired Immune Deficiency Syndrome has two primary parts providing requisites with respect to the prevention of opportunistic infections.

Part A - Formula Grants to States
- Use of Funds for Prevention Programs

- (a.) Establishment of education and information programs to prevent, reduce exposure to, and the transmission of the etiologic agent for the Acquired Immune Deficiency Syndrome.
- (b.) Education and information programs acquiring funds by the criteria of this title shall include significant content and knowledge concerning the detrimental and unhealthy effects of promiscuous sexual activity, intravenous substance abuse, and the benefits of abstinence or sexual abstinence from such activity.
- (c.) Education and information programs acquiring funds by the criteria of this title shall not be utilized to encourage or promote directly heterosexual or homosexual endeavors and intravenous substance abuse experimentation.
- (d.) Education programs shall be constructed to provide accurate information concerning various means to reduce an individual's risk of exposure to or the transmission of the etiologic agent for the Acquired Immune Deficiency Syndrome with regards that any informational materials are not obscene.

Subsections (b) and (c) are not to be construed to restrict the ability or intent of an education program with respect to the Acquired Immune Deficiency Syndrome.

- Establishment of program

- Allotments for states

- Provisions with respect to carrying out purpose of grants
- Requirement of submission of application concerning certain agreements and assurances
- Restrictions on use of grant
- Requirement of reports and audits by states
- Determination of amount of allotments for states
- Failure to comply with agreements
- Prohibition against certain false statements
- Technical assistance and provision by Secretary of Supplies and Services in lieu of grant funds
Part B - National Information Programs
- Availability of national information to general public

- (a.) Comprehensive Information Plan - Centers for Disease Control and Prevention is to annually prepare a comprehensive plan for a National Acquired Immune Deficiency Syndrome Information Program.
- (b.) Clearinghouse - Centers for Disease Control and Prevention is to establish a clearinghouse for the Acquired Immune Deficiency Syndrome information which shall be made available to Federal agencies, States, public and private entities, and the general public.

- (A.) Clearinghouse is to develop and obtain educational materials, model curricula, and methods directed to reducing the transmission of the etiologic agent for the Acquired Immune Deficiency Syndrome.
- (B.) Clearinghouse is to provide instruction and support for individuals who provide instruction in methods and techniques of education relating to the prevention of Acquired Immune Deficiency Syndrome and instruction in the use of the materials and curricula.
- (C.) Clearinghouse is to conduct or provide the conduct for the curricula, materials, and methods including the efficacy of such curricula, materials, and methods in preventing infection with the etiologic agent for the Acquired Immune Deficiency Syndrome.

- (c.) Toll-Free Telephone Communications - Establishment of 24-hour toll-free telephone communications to provide information and respond to queries from the general public concerning the Acquired Immune Deficiency Syndrome.

- Public information campaigns
- Provision of information to underserved populations

=== Subtitle D: National Commission on Acquired Immune Deficiency Syndrome ===
- Establishment of National Commission on Acquired Immune Deficiency Syndrome

=== Subtitle E: General Provisions ===
- Requirement of study with respect to minority health and Acquired Immune Deficiency Syndrome
- Establishment of office with respect to minority health and Acquired Immune Deficiency Syndrome

- Health Resources and Services Administration

- Information for health care and public safety workers

(a) Development and dissemination of guidelines
(b) Use in occupational standards as emphasized in the Occupational Safety and Health Act of 1970
(c) Development and dissemination of model curriculum for emergency response employees (EREs)

- Continuing education for health care providers
- Provide technical assistance to public and nonprofit private entities carrying out programs, projects, and activities relating to the Acquired Immune Deficiency Syndrome.
- Miscellaneous provisions

(a) Public health emergency fund
(b) Certain use of funds

Prohibits funds from being used to provide individuals with hypodermic needles or syringes for the use of illegal drugs, unless the Surgeon General determines that a demonstration needle exchange program is effective in reducing drug abuse and the risk that the public will become infected with the etiologic agent for Acquired Immune Deficiency Syndrome.

(c) Report on certain ethical issues

Congressional Biomedical Ethics Board will report on ethical issues associated with the administration of hydration and nutrition to fatal patients.

(d) Study of States laws

(A) Confidentiality and disclosure of information with respect to the counseling and testing records of individuals regarding the etiologic agent for Acquired Immune Deficiency Syndrome.
(B) Discrimination against individuals infected with or regarded as being infected with the etiologic agent for Acquired Immune Deficiency Syndrome.

== See also ==
ACT UP
History of HIV/AIDS
HIV/AIDS in New York City
HIV/AIDS in the United States
