= Nonprofits research =

The term nonprofits research is used to describe the academic enterprise devoted to teaching and research on nonprofit organizations and non-governmental organizations (NGOs), voluntary associations, voluntarism and voluntary action, philanthropy, civil society, and related activities. It is a loosely bounded, multidisciplinary, practice-oriented community.

== History ==
The field has its origins in the 1940s, when F. Emerson Andrews, a staffer at the Russell Sage Foundation, initiated a series of studies of foundations and philanthropy. Institutionally, Sage had a long-term interest in philanthropy as part of the larger problem of social welfare policy. In the 1940s and 1950s, Andrews and his associates produced a series of volumes on philanthropic giving (1950), corporation giving (1952), attitudes towards giving (1953), philanthropic foundations (1956), and government policies towards philanthropy (1968). Andrews also edited the first Foundation Directory (1967), founding editor of Foundation News, and was the first director of the Foundation Center (formerly the "Foundation Library Center").

Following a series of congressional investigations of foundations and "other tax-exempt entities," Andrews persuaded the Sage Foundation to sponsor a conference intended to encourage major scholars to study philanthropy. The conference, which convened in Princeton, New Jersey in 1956, became the basis for funding work by a number of influential historians, most notably the University of Wisconsin–Madison's Merle Curti. One of the leaders of the new interdisciplinary field, American Studies, Curti was well positioned to identify likely candidates for support in their studies of philanthropy. Curti and his students produced a number of studies, including books on international philanthropy (1963), philanthropy and higher education (1965), and the history of charities law (1961).

The enormous proliferation of foundations and other tax-exempt entities in the decades after the second World War helped to fuel new congressional concern about their power, wealth, and impact on national tax policy. Congressional concern pressured the Department of the Treasury and the Internal Revenue Service to review their policies towards these organizations. These concerns came to a head in debates over tax reform in 1969.

In the face of shocking abuses, leaders of organized philanthropy proved to be scandalously ineffective in defending themselves. In particular, they appeared to be completely unable to grasp the extent to which policy discourse had come to be framed by the language of law and economics. In the wake of the draconian provisions of the 1969 Tax Reform Act, a handful of philanthropy's leaders initiated efforts to produce a body of academic research with which the United States tax-exempt industries could more effectively defend themselves against outburst of regulatory enthusiasm.

Three groups took the lead in endeavoring to develop serious research on philanthropy, voluntary organizations, and related entities and activities. One, the 501(c)3 group, was a loose network of members of the tax-exempt bar, government officials, and foundation executives who regularly circulated among themselves information on policy and legislation relating to nonprofits. A second was a cluster of consultants and experts attached to John D. Rockefeller 3rd, the Rockefeller brother who had embraced philanthropy and its future as his calling. A third was an association of scholars and practitioners, the Association of Voluntary Action Scholars, organized by sociologist David Horton Smith, which evolved into the Association for Research on Nonprofit Organizations and Voluntary Action (ARNOVA).

== Sources ==
- Andrews, F. Emerson.
- Brilliant, Eleanor.
- Hall, Peter Dobkin. 1992. "Inventing the Nonprofit Sector and Other Essays on Philanthropy, Voluntarism, and Nonprofit Organizations." Baltimore, MD: The Johns Hopkins University Press.

Mod/* References */ Eugene Fram & Vicki Brown, How Using the Corporate Model Makes a Nonprofit Board More Effective & Efficient - Third Edition (2011), Amazon Books, Create Space Books.
