= Connection Distributing Co. v. Holder =

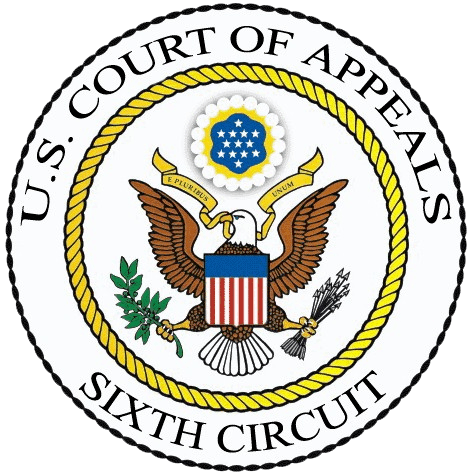
- Court: United States Court of Appeals for the Sixth Circuit
- Full case name: Connection Distributing Co.; Rondee Kamins; Jane Doe; John Doe v. Eric H. Holder, Jr., Attorney General
- Argued: September 10, 2008
- Decided: February 20, 2009
- Citations: Panel opinion: 505 F.3d 545 (October 23, 2007); En banc opinion: 557 F.3d 321 (February 20, 2009)

Case history
- Prior history: Summary judgment to the defendant, 95-01993 (N.D. Ohio)
- Subsequent history: Appeal turned down by the U.S. Supreme Court without comment on October 5, 2009.

Holding
- The court held that the record-keeping requirements of the Child Protection and Obscenity Enforcement Act did not violate the First Amendment.

Court membership
- Judges sitting: Danny Julian Boggs, Cornelia Groefsema Kennedy, Boyce F. Martin, Jr., Alice M. Batchelder, Martha Craig Daughtrey, Karen Nelson Moore, R. Guy Cole, Jr., Eric L. Clay, Ronald Lee Gilman, Julia Smith Gibbons, John M. Rogers, Jeffrey Sutton, Deborah L. Cook, David McKeague, Richard Allen Griffin, Raymond Kethledge, and Helene White

Case opinions
- Majority: Sutton, joined by Boggs, Batchelder, Daughtrey, Gilman, Gibbons, Rogers, Cook, McKeague, Griffin, Kethledge
- Dissent: Kennedy, joined by Martin, Moore, Cole, Clay, White
- Dissent: Moore, joined by Martin, Cole
- Dissent: Clay, joined by Martin, Cole
- Dissent: White

Laws applied
- U.S. Const. amend. I; Child Protection and Obscenity Enforcement Act

Connection Distributing Co. v. Holder, 557 F.3d 321 (6th Cir. 2009) is a case in which the United States Court of Appeals for the Sixth Circuit held that the record-keeping provisions of the Child Protection and Obscenity Enforcement Act did not violate the First Amendment.

Section 2257 of the Child Protection and Obscenity Enforcement Act requires those who create sexually explicit materials to maintain records of their model's age and identities, as a measure against child pornography. Connection Distributing, a publisher of swinging magazines, challenged the constitutionality of the statute, as individuals who posted on Connection's magazines would also be required to create and maintain such records, and provide them to the publisher.

In 2009, the Sixth Circuit ruled en banc that the provisions were not unconstitutional, while a panel of the court had decided in 2007 that the statute violated the First Amendment.

== Background ==
Connection Distributing is a publisher of magazines devoted to swinging. The magazines acts as a venue for people interested in swinging to share their interests, preferences, and availability, and principally consist of advertisements that allow self-promotion by individuals. Individuals do not mention their full names in the advertisements, and 85-90% of advertisers do not reveal their faces. However, they are required to share their names, addresses and phone numbers with the publisher. Connection forwards responses to ads for a fee and allows subscribers to call a 900-number service to contact advertisers.

Section 2257 of the Child Protection and Obscenity Enforcement Act places record-keeping requirements on "primary" and "secondary" producers of actual sexually explicit material. Primary producers, who create a visual representation of sexually explicit materials, must create and maintain records of the performers' age and identity. Secondary producers are those who publish sexually explicit materials, or upload such content to a website, or manage the content of the website; a secondary producer may meet the requirement by obtaining a copy of the primary producer's records. A regulated entity that fails to follow these requirements is subject to criminal penalties. The Act makes it a felony not to comply with these requirements, and a producer convicted of violating the Act may be fined and subject to as many as five years in prison.

Section 2257 is part of the Congress' effort to protect children from the pornographic industry. Prior to 1988, Congress tried to prevent the pornographic industry from exploiting children in two ways. First, it proscribed all pornography, whether or not it involved children. Second, it banned all other pornography involving children under the age of 18. However, research showed that these two measures did not effectively protect children mainly because the industry's inclination to use youthful-looking actresses, which made it difficult to find out whether children were used in obscene publications or movies. Therefore, in 1988, the Congress enacted the Child Protection and Obscenity Enforcement Act. And section 2257 of the Act laid out the requirements set forth above.

=== Procedural background ===
In 1995, Connection filed a complaint, challenging the record-keeping provisions of Section 2257. In Connection Distrib. Co. v. Reno, 154 F.3d 281, 285 (6th Cir. 1998), the Sixth Circuit affirmed the district court's denial of Connection's motion for preliminary injunction against the enforcement of Section 2257 and 28 C.F.R. § 75 (the related administrative law).

On remand, the district court granted summary judgment against Connection. A panel of the Sixth Circuit reversed and remanded the case such that it could be reconsidered in light of recent Supreme Court precedents.

==== District court opinion ====
After the Sixth Circuit panel remanded the case, Connection filed an amended complaint, again seeking a preliminary injunction, while the government sought summary judgment. The district court denied the preliminary injunction and granted summary judgment to the government.

==== Court of Appeals three-judge panel opinion ====
At the panel stage of the case, in Connection Distrib. Co. v. Keisler, the judges found that the record-keeping requirements of Section 2257 were overly broad and therefore violated the First Amendment. In the overbreadth issue it raised, the panel observed that the statute seemed to apply to private couples who create and keep sexually explicit images in their homes. The court held that the statute was facially invalid, and reversed the district court's judgment, directing it to enter summary judgment for Connection.

== Court of appeals en banc opinion ==
The Sixth Circuit addressed en banc the First Amendment claims made by the plaintiffs, first as an as-applied challenge by Connection to the record-keeping provisions of Section 2257, then as a facial challenge to the same statute. The court also considered whether the statute violated the Fifth Amendment's Self-Incrimination Clause as the plaintiffs claimed. The majority opinion written by Judge Jeffrey Sutton affirmed the district court's order granting summary judgment to the government, while six judges dissented, four of them writing dissenting opinions.

=== First Amendment claims ===
==== As-applied challenge ====
In its as-applied attack, Connection argued that the Child Protection Enforcement Act's record-keeping and disclosure provisions suppressed the free expression of Connection and its subscribers wishing to place sexually explicit advertisements in its magazines.

The court disagreed, stating that the law was content-neutral, and therefore was subject to intermediate scrutiny, and not the more rigorous strict scrutiny, in deciding whether the statute violated the First Amendment. The court made this decision on the basis that the law addressed underage pornography issues, which were "secondary effects" of the expression, and did not address the effect of its content on its audience. As such, the court held that the record-keeping requirements of the statute could be justified without reference to the content of the regulated speech.

Having determined that intermediate scrutiny applied in this challenge, the court then found that Section 2257 survived scrutiny, arguing that protecting children is a substantial government interest, and that universal age-verification is a reasonably tailored measure for many reasons. It rejected Connection's claim that the requirements placed barriers on the advertisers' interests in engaging in anonymous speech, stating that the claim was not credible, as Connection already required advertisers to submit their names, addresses, and phone numbers when placing an ad. When Connection remarked that Section 2257 made the information available to the government upon request, the court replied that "[the advertisers] have no more to complain about than every taxpayer in the country."

In dissent, Judge Karen Nelson Moore maintained that strict scrutiny should govern the as-applied challenge. In reply, Sutton's majority opinion stated that Connection did not urge the court to apply strict scrutiny to the case, and that the reasons given in the opinion justified the decision.

==== Facial challenge ====
As part of the facial challenge to the record-keeping requirements of Section 2257, Connection argued that the law would be unconstitutional as applied to a magazine of mature adult models, as it would be broader than is required, given the models would be clearly and visibly not minors. The court rejected this argument as a basis for invalidating Section 2257, stating that "Connection at most has identified a discrete application of the statute that may be problematic," and that Connection failed to show substantial overbreadth required for facially invalidating the statute.

In dissent, Judge Cornelia Groefsema Kennedy remarked that there were costs in requiring case-by-case adjudication, as some individuals who are wrongfully chilled from speaking may decline to seek remedy, as litigation is time-consuming, and can be expensive. Kennedy also argued that the absence of a prior application of the statute to private couples who create and keep sexually explicit material should not doom the facial-overbreadth challenge.

=== Fifth Amendment claims ===
The 2003 amendment to Section 2257 allows the government to use the records that must be maintained as evidence to other violations than only Section 2257. The three individual plaintiffs challenged the validity of the statute under the Fifth Amendment's Self-Incrimination Clause, as these records could implicate them in crimes. The court refused to resolve the merits of this claim on the basis that it was not ripe. The court noted that the claim was not fit for decision, as the government had not attempted to inspect any of Connection's records so far.

== Subsequent developments ==
In 2009, the Supreme Court denied the petition to reconsider the en banc decision of the Sixth Circuit. The decision is significant in maintaining that the record-keeping requirements of the Section 2257 are constitutional, and in its extended discussion of the overbreadth doctrine. The decision has been strongly criticized by the adult entertainment industry. The Electronic Frontier Foundation states it is currently working with the Free Speech Coalition to challenge the 2257 regulations, and filed an amicus curiae brief in the Eastern District of Pennsylvania.
