= F. Emerson Andrews =

Academic writer (1902–1978)

Frank Emerson Andrews (January 26, 1902 – August 7, 1978) was an academic writer, foundation consultant who was a president of the Foundation Center in New York. He was also a director at the Russell Sage Foundation. He also served as an editor of Foundation Directory periodical.

== Career ==
In 1928, he joined Russell Sage Foundation.

In 1956, he helped organize Foundation Library Center where served as a director and president until his retirement in 1967.

In August 1978, he died at the age of 78.

== Bibliography ==
- Andrews, F. Emerson (1935). New Numbers: How Acceptance of a Duodecimal (12) Base Would Simplify Mathematics
- Harrison, Shelby M.; Andrews, F. Emerson (1946). American Foundations for Social Welfare
- Glenn, John M.; Brandt, Lilian; Andrews, F. Emerson (1947). Russell Sage Foundation, 1907–1946
- Andrews, F. Emerson (1950). Philanthropic Giving
- Andrews, F. Emerson (1952). Corporation Giving
- Andrews, F. Emerson (1953). Attitudes Toward Giving
- Andrews, F. Emerson (1956). Philanthropic Foundations
- Andrews, F. Emerson (1958). Legal Instruments of Foundations
- Grugan's God
- UpsideDown Town
- Knights and Daze
- Numbers, Please
- Tenafly Public Library: A History
