= Child Protection and Obscenity Enforcement Act =

US federal law on sexually explicit material

- Long title: An Act to amend title 18 of the United States Code with respect to child protection and obscenity enforcement, and for other purposes.
- Enacted by: the 100th United States Congress

Citations
- Public law: Pub. L. 100–690, §§ 501–502
- Statutes at Large: 102 Stat. 4181

Codification
- Acts amended: Title 18 of the United States Code
- Titles amended: 18 U.S.C. §§ 2251–2252, § 1465, and others regarding child pornography and obscenity enforcement

Legislative history
- Introduced in the Senate as S. 2033 by Sen. Strom Thurmond (R–SC) on February 4, 1988; Committee consideration by Senate Judiciary; House Energy and Commerce; House Judiciary; House Ways and Means; Passed the Senate on October 14, 1988 (as amended) (Passed Senate (amended)); Passed the House on November 18, 1988 (Passed House (voice vote as part of Anti-Drug Abuse Act of 1988)); Signed into law by President Ronald Reagan on November 18, 1988

The Child Protection and Obscenity Enforcement Act of 1988, title VII, subtitle N of the Anti-Drug Abuse Act of 1988, Pub. L. 100–690, 102 Stat. 4181, enacted November 18, 1988, H.R. 5210, is part of a United States Act of Congress which places record-keeping requirements on the producers of actual, sexually explicit materials. The implementing regulations (colloquially known as the 2257) (C.F.R. Part 75), part of the United States Code of Federal Regulations, require producers of sexually explicit material to obtain proof of age for every model they shoot and retain those records. Federal inspectors may inspect these records at any time and prosecute violations.

== Allied administrative law (2257 regulations) ==
The administrative law that has been created by virtue of the Act to guide and aid its enforcement, 28 C.F.R. 75 (also known as the 2257 regulations), specifies record-keeping requirements for those wishing to produce sexually explicit media, and imposes criminal penalties for failure to comply. This is intended to ensure that no person under the legal age is involved in such undertakings. (See Pornography in the United States § Legality and Child pornography laws in the United States for more information about the term "sexually explicit".)

The regulations define the terms "primary producer" and "secondary producer". The term "produces" means:

- actually filming, videotaping, photographing, creating a picture, digital image, or digitally- or computer-manipulated image of an actual human being;
- digitizing an image, of a visual depiction of sexually explicit conduct; or, assembling, manufacturing, publishing, duplicating, reproducing, or reissuing a book, magazine, periodical, film, videotape, digital image, or picture, or other matter intended for commercial distribution, that contains a visual depiction of sexually explicit conduct; or
- inserting on a computer site or service a digital image of, or otherwise managing the sexually explicit content of a computer site or service that contains a visual depiction of, sexually explicit conduct;

and does not include activities that are limited to:

- photo or film processing, including digitization of previously existing visual depictions, as part of a commercial enterprise, with no other commercial interest in the sexually explicit material, printing, and video duplication;
- distribution;
- any activity, other than those activities identified in subparagraph (A), that does not involve the hiring, contracting for, managing, or otherwise arranging for the participation of the depicted performers;
- the provision of a telecommunications service, or of an Internet access service or Internet information location tool (as those terms are defined in section 231 of the Communications Act of 1934 (47 U.S.C. 231)); or
- the transmission, storage, retrieval, hosting, formatting, or translation (or any combination thereof) of a communication, without selection or alteration of the content of the communication, except that deletion of a particular communication or material made by another person in a manner consistent with section 230(c) of the Communications Act of 1934 (47 U.S.C. 230 (c)) shall not constitute such selection or alteration of the content of the communication.

A "primary producer" is defined in the set of rules as

any person

- who actually films, videotapes, photographs, or creates a digitally- or computer-manipulated image, a digital image, or a picture of, or who digitizes an image of, a visual depiction of an actual human being engaged in actual or simulated sexually explicit conduct.

When a corporation or other organization is the primary producer of any particular image or picture, then no individual employee or agent of that corporation or other organization will be considered to be a primary producer of that image or picture.

A "secondary producer" is

any person

- who produces, assembles, manufactures, publishes, duplicates, reproduces, or reissues a book, magazine, periodical, film, videotape, or digitally- or computer-manipulated image, picture, or other matter intended for commercial distribution that contains a visual depiction of an actual human being engaged in actual or simulated sexually explicit conduct, or
- who inserts on a computer site or service a digital image of, or otherwise manages the sexually explicit content of a computer site or service that contains a visual depiction of, an actual human being engaged in actual or simulated sexually explicit conduct, including any person who enters into a contract, agreement, or conspiracy to do any of the foregoing.

When a corporation or other organization is the secondary producer of any particular image or picture, then no individual of that corporation or other organization will be considered to be the secondary producer of that image or picture.

One may be both a primary and a secondary producer.

"Manage content" means

to make editorial or managerial decisions concerning the sexually explicit content of a computer site or service, but does not mean those who manage solely advertising, compliance with copyright law, or other forms of non-sexually explicit content.

"Computer site or service" means

a computer server-based file repository or file distribution service that is accessible over the Internet, World Wide Web, Usenet, or any other interactive computer service (as defined in 47 U.S.C. 230(f)(2)). Computer site or service includes without limitation, sites or services using hypertext markup language, hypertext transfer protocol, file transfer protocol, electronic mail transmission protocols, similar data transmission protocols, or any successor protocols, including but not limited to computer sites or services on the World Wide Web.

The regulations also spell out requirements for the maintenance, categorization, location, and inspection of records, as well as legal grounds for exemption of these requirements. They require that records be maintained for five years after the dissolution of a business that had been required to maintain them.

The Department of Justice can modify the regulations, based on the discretion, or possible future requirements, that has been given to it to do so by the Act.

== Enforcement ==
It is clear there is much sexual material on the Internet and elsewhere that would fall within the terms of this law. At present, the U.S. Department of Justice has only implemented one specific case based primarily on the new 2257 laws and its supportive regulations. The case was against Mantra Films, Inc., based in Santa Monica, California, and its sister company MRA Holdings (both owned by Joe Francis), who are the originators of the Girls Gone Wild video series. Francis and several of his managers were prosecuted, citing infractions of this act. In January 2007, these charges were for the most part dropped.

However, Francis and the company entered guilty pleas on three counts of failing to keep the required records and seven labeling violations for its series of DVDs and videos before U.S. District Judge Richard Smoak, agreeing to pay $2.1 million in fines and restitution. This allowed Francis to avoid possible harsher penalties which include five years prison time for each violation.

Also in 2006, the FBI, under the direction of United States attorney general John Ashcroft, began checking the 2257 records of several pornography production companies.

The final regulations implementing Congressional amendments to 2257, termed 2257A, were updated December 18, 2008, and went into effect on the same day as the inauguration of Barack Obama. On that same day, January 20, 2009, President Obama, through Chief of Staff Rahm Emanuel, requested by memorandum that heads of departments allow for review by the incoming administration of all regulations not then final.

== Legal challenges ==
The initial iteration of 2257, first passed in 1988, mandated that producers keep records of the age and identity of performers and affix statements as to the location of the records to depictions. However, rather than penalties for noncompliance, the statute created a rebuttable presumption that the performer was a minor. Pub. L. 100-690. This version was struck down as unconstitutional in American Library Association v. Thornburgh on First Amendment grounds. 713 F. Supp. 469 (D.D.C. 1989) vacated as moot 956 F.2d 1178 (D.C. Cir. 1992).

After Thornburgh, Congress amended 2257 to impose direct criminal penalties for noncompliance with the record-keeping requirements. The same plaintiffs challenged the amended statute and accompanying regulations, but the new version was upheld by American Library Association v. Reno, 33 F.3d 78 (D.C. Cir. 1994).

In Sundance Association Inc. v. Reno, 139 F.3d 804 (10th Cir. 1998), the Tenth Circuit rejected the regulation's distinction between primary and secondary producers and entirely exempted from the record-keeping requirements those who merely distribute or those whose activity "does not involve hiring, contracting for, managing, or otherwise arranging for the participation of the performers depicted." 18 U.S.C. § 2257(h)(3).

=== PROTECT ACT related challenges ===
==== Challenges to initial regulations (2005 to 2010) ====
In 2004, bound by the new PROTECT Act of 2003, the DOJ made changes to the 2257 regulations to keep up with the proliferation of sexually explicit material found on the Internet. Currently the 18 U.S.C. 2257 regulations do not pertain to simulated pornography (e.g., hentai, etc.) provided such is not facially obscene.

In June 2005, the Free Speech Coalition (an advocacy group for the adult entertainment industry) sued the Department of Justice to enjoin the regulations until they could obtain a court hearing. In December 2006, a federal judge issued an injunction protecting secondary producers who were members of the Free Speech Coalition, but FBI inspections of these producers were still ongoing despite the injunction. On March 30, 2007, District Court Judge Walker Miller issued an interim ruling, which dismissed some causes of action and allowed others from the initial 2005 case to proceed in light of the Walsh Act amendments. The actual trial phase had not yet begun.On October 23, 2007, the 6th Circuit U.S. Court of Appeals ruled the federal record-keeping statute unconstitutional, holding that the law is overly broad and facially invalid. The Sixth Circuit subsequently reheard the case en banc and issued an opinion on February 20, 2009, upholding the constitutionality of the record-keeping requirements, albeit with some dissents. The United States Supreme Court refused to hear (denied certiorari to) the April 2009 challenge to Connection Distributing Co. v. Holder, the Sixth Circuit Court of Appeals decision on the legality of 2257 and its enforcement. (See "Order List", Monday, October 5, 2009).

==== Challenges to later 2007 regulations (2010 to 2016) ====
After a July 2010 decision by U.S. District Judge Michael Baylson to dismiss the FSC's lawsuit per the request of U.S. Attorney General Eric Holder's DOJ, agreeing that USC 2257 and 2257A regulations are constitutional, the FSC then filed an additional appeal to amend their original challenge to the constitutionality challenge. On Monday, September 20, 2010, Judge Baylson rejected FSC's amended appeal, allowing the government record-keeping inspections to be restarted.

The FSC appealed this case to the Court of Appeals for the Third Circuit. In 2016, the court ruled that the record-keeping regulations did not violate the First Amendment. However, they also ruled that requiring adult producers to make the records available without a warrant, accessible by law enforcement for any reason, violated a producer's Fourth Amendment protections against unreasonable search and seizure.

== See also ==
- Internet Safety Act
