= Fair Credit and Charge Card Disclosure Act =

American consumer protection law

The Fair Credit and Charge Card Disclosure Act (abbreviated as the FCCCDA) is an American consumer protection law that requires credit card companies and loan agencies to disclose any "fine print" about a loan or line of credit to the consumer. This includes information about variable interest rates and fees.

The FCCCDA was passed in 1988. It was sponsored by Chuck Schumer and signed into law by President Ronald Reagan.

This act amended the Truth in Lending Act.
