= 1986 United States House of Representatives elections =

House elections for the 100th U.S. Congress

- November 4, 1986

All 435 seats in the United States House of Representatives 218 seats needed for a majority
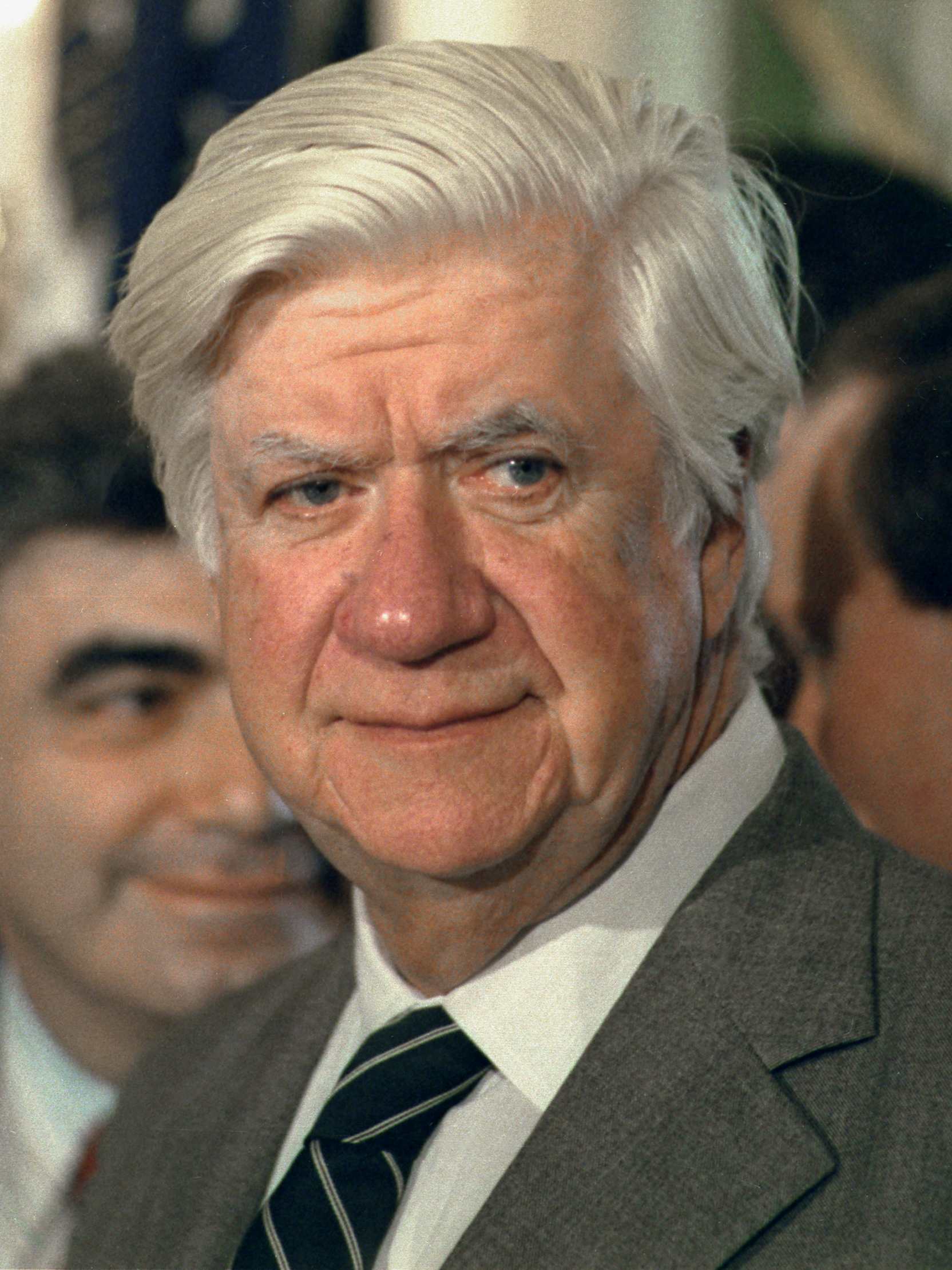

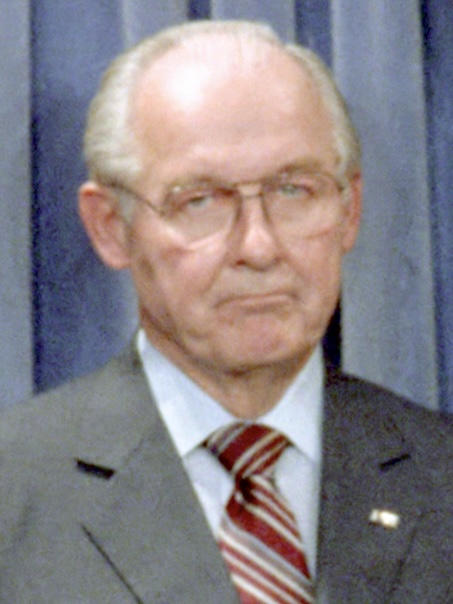
	Majority party	Minority party
Leader	Tip O'Neill (retired)	Bob Michel
Party	Democratic	Republican
Leader since	January 4, 1977	January 3, 1981
Leader's seat	Massachusetts 8th	Illinois 18th
Last election	253 seats	181 seats
Seats won	258	177
Seat change	▲5	▼4
Popular vote	32,447,021	26,533,178
Percentage	54.3%	44.4%
Swing	▲2.2pp	▼2.6pp
	Third party
Party	Conservative
Last election	1
Seats won	0
Seat change	▼1
Popular vote	58,712
Percentage	0.1%
Swing	▲0.1pp
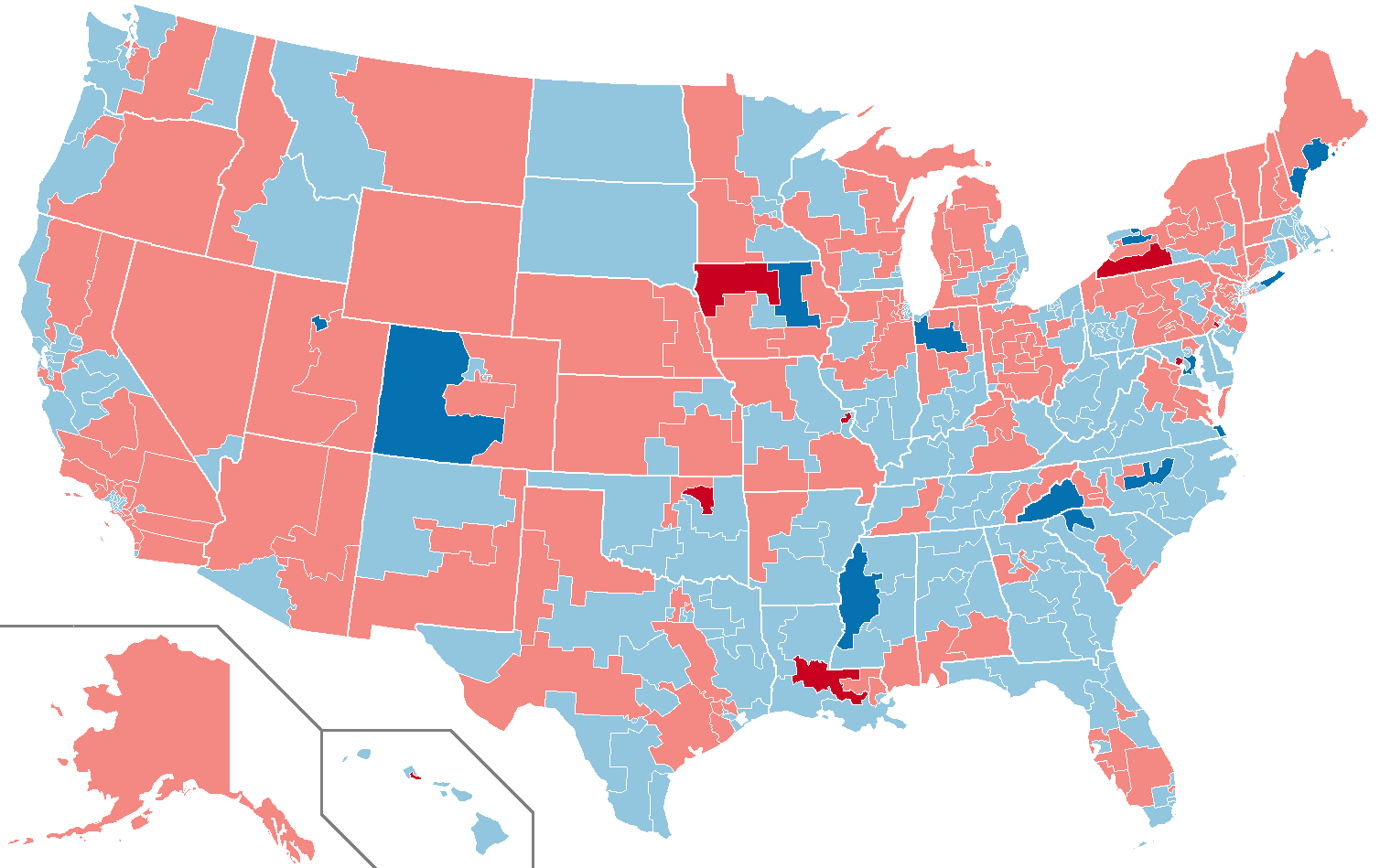
- Results: Democratic hold Democratic gain Republican hold Republican gain
Speaker before election
Tip O'Neill
Democratic
Elected Speaker
Jim Wright
Democratic

The 1986 United States House of Representatives elections was held on November 4, 1986, to elect U.S. Representatives to serve in the 100th United States Congress. They occurred in the middle of President Ronald Reagan's second term in office, while he was still relatively popular with the American public. As in most mid-term elections, the president's party — in this case, the Republican Party — lost seats, with the Democratic Party gaining a net of five seats and cementing its majority. These results were not as dramatic as those in the Senate, where the Republicans lost control of the chamber to the Democrats.

== Overall results ==
393 incumbent members sought reelection, but 2 were defeated in primaries and 6 defeated in the general election for a total of 385 incumbents winning.

↓
258	177
Democratic	Republican

Party	Seats			Seat percentage	Vote percentage	Popular vote
Party	Last election (1984)	This election	Net change	Seat percentage	Vote percentage	Popular vote
Democratic	253	258	▲5	59.3%	54.3%	32,447,021
Republican	181	177	▼4	40.7%	44.4%	26,533,178
Independent	0	0	Steady	0.0%	0.2%	157,332
Libertarian	0	0	Steady	0.0%	0.2%	121,076
Conservative	1	0	▼1	0.0%	0.1%	58,712
Peace and Freedom	0	0	Steady	0.0%	0.1%	57,003
Right to Life	0	0	Steady	0.0%	0.1%	39,407
Others	0	0	Steady	0.0%	0.6%	344,668
Totals	435	435	Steady	100.0%	100.0%	59,758,397

Source: Election Statistics - Office of the Clerk

Popular vote
Democratic	54.30%
Republican	44.40%
Libertarian	0.20%
Others	1.10%

House seats
Democratic	59.31%
Republican	40.69%

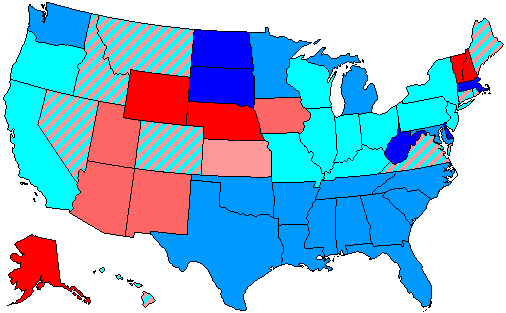
House seats by party holding plurality in state: 80%+ to 100% Democratic / 80%+ to 100% Republican; 60%+ to 80% Democratic / 60%+ to 80% Republican; up to 60% Democratic / up to 60% Republican

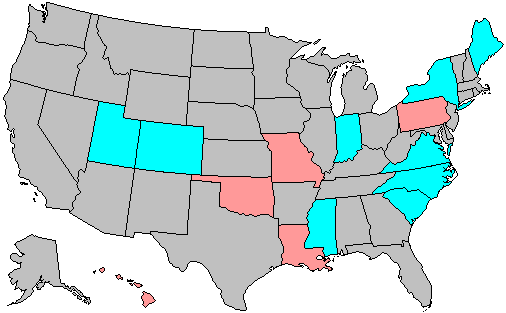
Change in House seats by party: 6+ Democratic gain / 6+ Republican gain; 3 to 5 Democratic gain / 3 to 5 Republican gain; 1 to 2 Democratic gain / 1 to 2 Republican gain; no net change

== Retiring incumbents ==
A total of 40 representatives (19 Democrats and 21 Republicans) retired, 22 of whom (12 Democrats and 10 Republicans) retired to run for other offices.

=== Democrats ===
Nineteen incumbent Democrats retired.

1. Alabama 7: Richard Shelby: retired to run for U.S. Senate.
2. Colorado 2: Tim Wirth: retired to run for U.S. Senate.
3. Florida 2: Don Fuqua retired.
4. Georgia 5: Wyche Fowler: retired to run for U.S. Senate.
5. Iowa 6: Berkley Bedell retired.
6. Louisiana 7: John Breaux: retired to run for U.S. Senate.
7. Louisiana 8: Catherine Small Long retired.
8. Maryland 3: Barbara Mikulski: retired to run for U.S. Senate.
9. Maryland 7: Parren Mitchell retired.
10. Maryland 8: Michael D. Barnes: retired to run for U.S. Senate.
11. Massachusetts 8: Tip O'Neill retired.
12. Nevada 1: Harry Reid: retired to run for U.S. Senate.
13. New York 34: Stan Lundine: retired to run for Lieutenant Governor of New York.
14. North Carolina 3: Charles Whitley retired.
15. Ohio 14: John F. Seiberling retired.
16. Oklahoma 1: James R. Jones: retired to run for U.S. Senate.
17. Oregon 4: Jim Weaver: retired to run for U.S. Senate.
18. Pennsylvania 7: Bob Edgar: retired to run for U.S. Senate.
19. South Dakota at-large: Tom Daschle: retired to run for U.S. Senate.

=== Republicans ===
Twenty-one incumbent Republicans retired.

1. Arizona 1: John McCain: retired to run for U.S. Senate.
2. Arizona 4: Eldon Rudd retired.
3. California 2: Eugene A. Chappie retired.
4. California 12: Ed Zschau: retired to run for U.S. Senate.
5. California 21: Bobbi Fiedler: retired to run for U.S. Senate.
6. Colorado 5: Ken Kramer: retired to run for U.S. Senate.
7. Illinois 4: George M. O'Brien retired.
8. Illinois 14: John E. Grotberg retired.
9. Indiana 5: Elwood Hillis retired.
10. Iowa 3: T. Cooper Evans retired.
11. Kentucky 4: Gene Snyder retired.
12. Louisiana 6: Henson Moore: retired to run for U.S. Senate.
13. Maine 1: John R. McKernan Jr.: retired to run for Governor of Maine.
14. Maryland 4: Marjorie Holt retired.
15. New York 1: William Carney retired.
16. Ohio 8: Tom Kindness: retired to run for U.S. Senate.
17. South Carolina 1: Thomas F. Hartnett: retired to run for Lieutenant Governor of South Carolina.
18. South Carolina 4: Carroll A. Campbell Jr.: retired to run for Governor of South Carolina.
19. Texas 21: Tom Loeffler: retired to run for Governor of Texas.
20. Utah 2: David Smith Monson retired.
21. Virginia 2: G. William Whitehurst retired.

== Resignations and deaths ==
=== Democrats ===
One Democrat died in office and one Democrat resigned.

1. New York 6: Joseph P. Addabbo died April 10, 1986.
2. Hawaii 1: Cecil Heftel resigned July 11, 1986, to campaign for Governor of Hawaii.

=== Republicans ===
One Republican resigned.

1. North Carolina 10: Jim Broyhill retired to run for U.S. Senate, then resigned July 14, 1986, to become U.S. Senator.

== Incumbents defeated ==
=== In primary elections ===
==== Democrats ====
Two Democrats lost renomination.

1. Hawaii 1: Neil Abercrombie lost renomination to Mufi Hannemann, who lost the general election to Pat Saiki.
2. New York 6: Alton Waldon lost renomination to Floyd Flake, who won the general election.

==== Republican ====
One Republican lost renomination

1. Michigan 4: Mark D. Siljander lost renomination to Fred Upton, who won the general election.

=== In general elections ===
==== Democrats ====
One Democrat lost re-election to Republicans

1. Missouri 2: Robert A. Young lost re-election to Jack Buechner.

==== Republicans ====
5 Republicans lost re-election to Democrats

1. Colorado 3: Michael L. Strang lost re-election to Ben Nighthorse Campbell.
2. Mississippi 2: Webb Franklin lost re-election to Mike Espy.
3. New York 30: Fred J. Eckert lost re-election to Louise Slaughter.
4. North Carolina 4: Bill Cobey lost re-election to David Price.
5. North Carolina 11: Bill Hendon lost re-election to James M. Clarke.

== Open seats that changed parties ==
=== Republican seats won by Democrats ===
Eight Republican seats were won by Democrats:

1. Indiana 5: won by Jim Jontz.
2. Iowa 3: won by David R. Nagle.
3. Maine 1: won by Joseph E. Brennan.
4. Maryland 2: won by Tom McMillen.
5. New York 1: won by George J. Hochbrueckner.
6. South Carolina 4: won by Liz J. Patterson.
7. Utah 2: won by Wayne Owens.
8. Virginia 2: won by Owen B. Pickett.

=== Democratic seats won by Republicans ===
Seven Democratic seat was won by a Republican:

1. Hawaii 1: won by Pat Saiki.
2. Iowa 6: won by Fred Grandy.
3. Louisiana 8: won by Clyde C. Holloway.
4. Maryland 8: won by Connie Morella.
5. New York 34: won by Amo Houghton.
6. Oklahoma 1: won by Jim Inhofe.
7. Pennsylvania 7: won by Curt Weldon.

== Open seats that parties held ==
=== Democratic seats held by Democrats ===
Democrats held fourteen of their open seats

1. Alabama 7: Won by Claude Harris Jr.
2. Colorado 2: Won by David Skaggs
3. Florida 2: Won by Bill Grant
4. Georgia 5: Won by John Lewis
5. Louisiana 7: Won by Jimmy Hayes
6. Maryland 3: Won by Ben Cardin
7. Maryland 7: Won by Kwiesi Mfume
8. Massachusetts 8: Won by Joseph P. Kennedy II
9. Nevada 1: Won by James Bilbray
10. New York 6: Won by Floyd Flake
11. North Carolina 3: Won by Martin Lancaster
12. Ohio 14: Won by Tom Sawyer
13. Oregon 4: Won by Peter DeFazio
14. South Dakota at-large: Won by Tim Johnson

=== Republican seats held by Republicans ===
Republicans held fifteen of their open seats

1. Arizona 1: Won by Jay Rhodes
2. Arizona 4: Won by Jon Kyl
3. California 2: Won by Wally Herger
4. California 12: Won by Ernie Konnyu
5. California 21: Won by Elton Gallegly
6. California 5: Won by Joel Hefley
7. Illinois 4: Won by Jack Davis
8. Illinois 14: Won by Dennis Hastert
9. Kentucky 4: Won by Jim Bunning
10. Louisiana 6: Won by Richard Baker
11. Michigan 4: Won by Fred Upton
12. North Carolina 10: Won by Cass Ballenger
13. Ohio 8: Won by Donald "Buz" Lukens
14. South Carolina 1: Won by Arthur Ravenel Jr.
15. Texas 21: Won by Lamar S. Smith

== Special elections ==
Sorted by election date

District	Predecessor	Party	Results	Candidates
New York 6	Joseph P. Addabbo	Democratic	Incumbent died April 10, 1986. New member elected June 10, 1986. Democratic hold. Winner was not renominated in primary for re-election in November; see below.	▌ ✓ Alton Waldon (Democratic) 31.0%; ▌Floyd Flake (Unity) 30.3%; ▌Bo Dietl (Republican) 21.3%; ▌Kevin McCabe (Good Government) 9.1%; ▌Andrew Jenkins (Liberal) 8.2
Hawaii 1	Cecil Heftel	Democratic	Incumbent resigned July 11, 1986, to campaign for Governor of Hawaii. New member elected September 20, 1986. Democratic hold. Winner was not renominated in primary for re-election in November; see below.	▌ ✓ Neil Abercrombie (Democratic) 29.9%; ▌Pat Saiki (Republican) 29.2%; ▌Mufi Hannemann (Democratic) 28.3%; ▌Steve Cobb (Democratic) 11.9%; ▌Louis Agard (Democratic) 0.4%; ▌Blase Harris (Independent) 0.3%

== Alabama ==
District	Incumbent	Party	First elected	Result	Candidates
Alabama 1	Sonny Callahan	Republican	1984	Incumbent re-elected.	▌ ✓ Sonny Callahan (Republican) 99.9%
Alabama 2	William L. Dickinson	Republican	1964	Incumbent re-elected.	▌ ✓ William L. Dickinson (Republican) 66.7%; ▌Mercer Stone (Democratic) 33.3%
Alabama 3	Bill Nichols	Democratic	1966	Incumbent re-elected.	▌ ✓ Bill Nichols (Democratic) 80.6%; ▌Whit Guerin (Libertarian) 19.4%
Alabama 4	Tom Bevill	Democratic	1966	Incumbent re-elected.	▌ ✓ Tom Bevill (Democratic) 77.5%; ▌Al DeShazo (Republican) 22.5%
Alabama 5	Ronnie Flippo	Democratic	1976	Incumbent re-elected.	▌ ✓ Ronnie Flippo (Democratic) 78.9%; ▌Herb McCarley (Libertarian) 21.1%
Alabama 6	Ben Erdreich	Democratic	1982	Incumbent re-elected.	▌ ✓ Ben Erdreich (Democratic) 72.7%; ▌L. Morgan Williams (Republican) 27.0%; ▌Martin J. Boyers (Socialist Workers) 0.2%
Alabama 7	Richard Shelby	Democratic	1978	Incumbent retired to run for U.S. Senator. Democratic hold.	▌ ✓ Claude Harris Jr. (Democratic) 59.8%; ▌Bill McFarland (Republican) 40.2%

== Alaska ==
District	Incumbent	Party	First elected	Result	Candidates
Alaska at-large	Don Young	Republican	1973 (special)	Incumbent re-elected.	▌ ✓ Don Young (Republican) 56.5%; ▌Pegge Begich (Democratic) 41.1%; ▌Betty Breck (Libertarian) 2.3%

== Arizona ==
District	Incumbent	Party	First elected	Result	Candidates
Arizona 1	John McCain	Republican	1982	Incumbent retired to run for U.S. Senator. Republican hold.	▌ ✓ Jay Rhodes (Republican) 71.3%; ▌Harry Braun (Democratic) 28.7%
Arizona 2	Mo Udall	Democratic	1961 (special)	Incumbent re-elected.	▌ ✓ Mo Udall (Democratic) 73.3%; ▌Sheldon Clark (Republican) 23.3%; ▌Lorenzo Torrez (Independent) 3.5%
Arizona 3	Bob Stump	Republican	1976 (Note: Stump was originally elected as a Democrat. He switched parties in 1982 and was re-elected as such that year.)	Incumbent re-elected.	▌ ✓ Bob Stump (Republican) Uncontested
Arizona 4	Eldon Rudd	Republican	1976	Incumbent retired. Republican hold.	▌ ✓ Jon Kyl (Republican) 64.6%; ▌Philip R. Davis (Democratic) 35.4%
Arizona 5	Jim Kolbe	Republican	1984	Incumbent re-elected.	▌ ✓ Jim Kolbe (Republican) 64.9%; ▌Joel Ireland (Democratic) 35.1%

== Arkansas ==
District	Incumbent	Party	First elected	Result	Candidates
Arkansas 1	Bill Alexander	Democratic	1968	Incumbent re-elected.	▌ ✓ Bill Alexander (Democratic) 64.2%; ▌Rick H. Albin (Republican) 35.8%
Arkansas 2	Tommy F. Robinson	Democratic	1984	Incumbent re-elected.	▌ ✓ Tommy F. Robinson (Democratic) 75.7%; ▌Keith Hamaker (Republican) 24.2%; ▌Elton White (Write-in) 0.05%
Arkansas 3	John Paul Hammerschmidt	Republican	1966	Incumbent re-elected.	▌ ✓ John Paul Hammerschmidt (Republican) 79.8%; ▌Su Sargent (Democratic) 20.2%
Arkansas 4	Beryl Anthony Jr.	Democratic	1978	Incumbent re-elected.	▌ ✓ Beryl Anthony Jr. (Democratic) 77.4%; ▌Lamar Keels (Republican) 15.4%; ▌Stephen A. Bitely (Independent) 7.1%

== California ==
District	Incumbent	Party	First elected	Result	Candidates
California 1	Douglas H. Bosco	Democratic	1982	Incumbent re-elected.	▌ ✓ Douglas H. Bosco (Democratic) 67.5%; ▌Floyd G. Sampson (Republican) 26.6%; ▌Elden McFarland (Peace and Freedom) 5.9%
California 2	Eugene A. Chappie	Republican	1980	Incumbent retired. Republican hold.	▌ ✓ Wally Herger (Republican) 58.3%; ▌Steve Swendiman (Democratic) 39.6%; ▌Harry H. Pendery (Libertarian) 2.2%
California 3	Bob Matsui	Democratic	1978	Incumbent re-elected.	▌ ✓ Bob Matsui (Democratic) 75.9%; ▌Lowell Landowski (Republican) 24.1%
California 4	Vic Fazio	Democratic	1978	Incumbent re-elected.	▌ ✓ Vic Fazio (Democratic) 70.2%; ▌Jack D. Hite (Republican) 29.8%
California 5	Sala Burton	Democratic	1983 (special)	Incumbent re-elected.	▌ ✓ Sala Burton (Democratic) 75.2%; ▌Mike Garza (Republican) 22.1%; ▌Sam Grove (Libertarian) 1.5%; ▌Ted Zuur (Peace and Freedom) 1.3%
California 6	Barbara Boxer	Democratic	1982	Incumbent re-elected.	▌ ✓ Barbara Boxer (Democratic) 73.9%; ▌Harry Ernst (Republican) 26.1%
California 7	George Miller	Democratic	1974	Incumbent re-elected.	▌ ✓ George Miller (Democratic) 66.6%; ▌Rosemary Thakar (Republican) 33.4%
California 8	Ron Dellums	Democratic	1970	Incumbent re-elected.	▌ ✓ Ron Dellums (Democratic) 60.0%; ▌Steven Eigenberg (Republican) 37.9%; ▌Lawrence R. Manuel (Peace and Freedom) 2.1%
California 9	Pete Stark	Democratic	1972	Incumbent re-elected.	▌ ✓ Pete Stark (Democratic) 69.7%; ▌Dave Williams (Republican) 30.3%
California 10	Don Edwards	Democratic	1962	Incumbent re-elected.	▌ ✓ Don Edwards (Democratic) 70.5%; ▌Michael R. La Crone (Republican) 26.6%; ▌Perr Cardestam (Libertarian) 1.5%; ▌Bradley L. Mayer (Peace and Freedom) 1.4%
California 11	Tom Lantos	Democratic	1980	Incumbent re-elected.	▌ ✓ Tom Lantos (Democratic) 74.1%; ▌Bill Quraishi (Republican) 25.9%
California 12	Ed Zschau	Republican	1982	Incumbent retired to run for U.S. Senator. Republican hold.	▌ ✓ Ernie Konnyu (Republican) 59.5%; ▌Lance T. Weil (Democratic) 37.2%; ▌Bill White (Libertarian) 3.4%
California 13	Norman Mineta	Democratic	1974	Incumbent re-elected.	▌ ✓ Norman Mineta (Democratic) 69.7%; ▌Bob Nash (Republican) 30.3%
California 14	Norman D. Shumway	Republican	1978	Incumbent re-elected.	▌ ✓ Norman D. Shumway (Republican) 71.6%; ▌Bill Steele (Democratic) 26.1%; ▌Bruce A. Daniel (Libertarian) 2.3%
California 15	Tony Coelho	Democratic	1978	Incumbent re-elected.	▌ ✓ Tony Coelho (Democratic) 71.0%; ▌Carol O. Harner (Republican) 27.2%; ▌Richard M. Harris (Libertarian) 1.8%
California 16	Leon Panetta	Democratic	1976	Incumbent re-elected.	▌ ✓ Leon Panetta (Democratic) 78.4%; ▌Louis Darrigo (Republican) 19.2%; ▌Ron Wright (Peace and Freedom) 1.2%; ▌Bill Anderson (Libertarian) 1.2%
California 17	Chip Pashayan	Republican	1978	Incumbent re-elected.	▌ ✓ Chip Pashayan (Republican) 60.2%; ▌John Hartnett (Democratic) 39.8%
California 18	Richard H. Lehman	Democratic	1982	Incumbent re-elected.	▌ ✓ Richard H. Lehman (Democratic) 71.3%; ▌David C. Crevelt (Republican) 28.7%
California 19	Bob Lagomarsino	Republican	1974	Incumbent re-elected.	▌ ✓ Bob Lagomarsino (Republican) 71.9%; ▌Wayne B. Norris (Democratic) 26.8%; ▌George Hasara (Libertarian) 1.4%
California 20	Bill Thomas	Republican	1978	Incumbent re-elected.	▌ ✓ Bill Thomas (Republican) 72.6%; ▌Jules H. Moquin (Democratic) 27.4%
California 21	Bobbi Fiedler	Republican	1980	Incumbent retired to run for U.S. Senator. Republican hold.	▌ ✓ Elton Gallegly (Republican) 68.4%; ▌Gilbert R. Saldana (Democratic) 28.2%; ▌Daniel Wiener (Libertarian) 3.4%
California 22	Carlos Moorhead	Republican	1972	Incumbent re-elected.	▌ ✓ Carlos Moorhead (Republican) 73.8%; ▌John G. Simmons (Democratic) 23.0%; ▌Jona Joy Bergland (Libertarian) 1.6%; ▌Joel Lorimer (Peace and Freedom) 1.5%
California 23	Anthony Beilenson	Democratic	1976	Incumbent re-elected.	▌ ✓ Anthony Beilenson (Democratic) 65.7%; ▌George Woolverton (Republican) 31.8%; ▌Tom Hopke (Peace and Freedom) 1.4%; ▌Taylor Rhodes (Libertarian) 1.1%
California 24	Henry Waxman	Democratic	1974	Incumbent re-elected.	▌ ✓ Henry Waxman (Democratic) 87.9%; ▌George Abrahams (Libertarian) 7.5%; ▌James Green (Peace and Freedom) 4.6%
California 25	Edward R. Roybal	Democratic	1962	Incumbent re-elected.	▌ ✓ Edward R. Roybal (Democratic) 76.1%; ▌Gregory L. Hardy (Republican) 21.3%; ▌Ted Brown (Libertarian) 2.6%
California 26	Howard Berman	Democratic	1982	Incumbent re-elected.	▌ ✓ Howard Berman (Democratic) 65.1%; ▌Robert M. Kerns (Republican) 34.9%
California 27	Mel Levine	Democratic	1982	Incumbent re-elected.	▌ ✓ Mel Levine (Democratic) 63.7%; ▌Robert B. Scribner (Republican) 34.3%; ▌Thomas O'Connor (Peace and Freedom) 1.2%; ▌Jeff Avrech (Libertarian) 0.8%
California 28	Julian Dixon	Democratic	1978	Incumbent re-elected.	▌ ✓ Julian Dixon (Democratic) 76.3%; ▌George Zaldivar Adams (Republican) 21.3%; ▌Howard Johnson (Libertarian) 2.3%
California 29	Augustus Hawkins	Democratic	1962	Incumbent re-elected.	▌ ✓ Augustus Hawkins (Democratic) 84.5%; ▌John Van de Brooke (Republican) 14.5%; ▌Waheed R. Boctor (Libertarian) 0.9%
California 30	Matthew G. Martínez	Democratic	1982	Incumbent re-elected.	▌ ✓ Matthew G. Martínez (Democratic) 62.5%; ▌John W. Almquist (Republican) 35.5%; ▌Kim J. Goldsworthy (Libertarian) 2.0%
California 31	Mervyn Dymally	Democratic	1980	Incumbent re-elected.	▌ ✓ Mervyn Dymally (Democratic) 70.3%; ▌Jack McMurray (Republican) 27.6%; ▌B. Kwaku Duren (Peace and Freedom) 2.1%
California 32	Glenn M. Anderson	Democratic	1968	Incumbent re-elected.	▌ ✓ Glenn M. Anderson (Democratic) 68.5%; ▌Joyce M. Robertson (Republican) 29.4%; ▌John S. Donohue (Peace and Freedom) 2.1%
California 33	David Dreier	Republican	1980	Incumbent re-elected.	▌ ✓ David Dreier (Republican) 71.7%; ▌Monty Hempel (Democratic) 26.8%; ▌Mike Noonan (Peace and Freedom) 1.5%
California 34	Esteban Torres	Democratic	1982	Incumbent re-elected.	▌ ✓ Esteban Torres (Democratic) 60.3%; ▌Charles M. House (Republican) 39.7%
California 35	Jerry Lewis	Republican	1978	Incumbent re-elected.	▌ ✓ Jerry Lewis (Republican) 76.9%; ▌Sarge Hall (Democratic) 23.1%
California 36	George Brown Jr.	Democratic	1962; 1970 (retired); 1972	Incumbent re-elected.	▌ ✓ George Brown Jr. (Democratic) 57.1%; ▌Bob Henley (Republican) 42.9%
California 37	Al McCandless	Republican	1982	Incumbent re-elected.	▌ ✓ Al McCandless (Republican) 63.7%; ▌Dave Skinner (Democratic) 36.3%
California 38	Bob Dornan	Republican	1976; 1982 (retired); 1984	Incumbent re-elected.	▌ ✓ Bob Dornan (Republican) 55.3%; ▌Richard H. Robinson (Democratic) 42.4%; ▌Lee Connelly (Libertarian) 2.3%
California 39	William Dannemeyer	Republican	1978	Incumbent re-elected.	▌ ✓ William Dannemeyer (Republican) 74.5%; ▌David D. Vest (Democratic) 24.0%; ▌Frank Boeheim (Peace and Freedom) 1.6%
California 40	Robert Badham	Republican	1976	Incumbent re-elected.	▌ ✓ Robert Badham (Republican) 59.8%; ▌Bruce W. Sumner (Democratic) 37.7%; ▌Steve Sears (Peace and Freedom) 2.5%
California 41	Bill Lowery	Republican	1980	Incumbent re-elected.	▌ ✓ Bill Lowery (Republican) 67.8%; ▌Dan Kripke (Democratic) 30.4%; ▌Dick Rider (Libertarian) 1.8%
California 42	Dan Lungren	Republican	1978	Incumbent re-elected.	▌ ✓ Dan Lungren (Republican) 72.8%; ▌Michael P. Blackburn (Democratic) 24.7%; ▌Kate McClatchy (Peace and Freedom) 2.5%
California 43	Ron Packard	Republican	1982	Incumbent re-elected.	▌ ✓ Ron Packard (Republican) 73.1%; ▌Joseph Chirra (Democratic) 24.0%; ▌Phyllis Avery (Libertarian) 2.9%
California 44	Jim Bates	Democratic	1982	Incumbent re-elected.	▌ ✓ Jim Bates (Democratic) 64.2%; ▌Bill Mitchell (Republican) 33.1%; ▌Shirley Isaacson (Peace and Freedom) 1.5%; ▌Dennis Thompson (Libertarian) 1.1%
California 45	Duncan L. Hunter	Republican	1980	Incumbent re-elected.	▌ ✓ Duncan L. Hunter (Republican) 76.9%; ▌Hewitt Fitts Ryan (Democratic) 21.2%; ▌Lee Schwartz (Libertarian) 1.9%

== Colorado ==
District	Incumbent	Party	First elected	Result	Candidates	Ref
Colorado 1	Pat Schroeder	Democratic	1972	Incumbent re-elected.	▌ ✓ Pat Schroeder (Democratic) 68.4%; ▌Joy Wood (Republican) 31.6%	
Colorado 2	Tim Wirth	Democratic	1974	Incumbent retired to run for U.S. Senator. Democratic hold.	▌ ✓ David Skaggs (Democratic) 51.5%; ▌Mike Norton (Republican) 48.5%	
Colorado 3	Michael L. Strang	Republican	1984	Incumbent lost re-election. Democratic gain.	▌ ✓ Ben Nighthorse Campbell (Democratic) 51.9%; ▌Michael L. Strang (Republican) 48.1%	
Colorado 4	Hank Brown	Republican	1980	Incumbent re-elected.	▌ ✓ Hank Brown (Republican) 69.8%; ▌David Sprague (Democratic) 30.2%	
Colorado 5	Ken Kramer	Republican	1978	Incumbent retired to run for U.S. Senator. Republican hold.	▌ ✓ Joel Hefley (Republican) 69.8%; ▌Bill Story (Democratic) 30.2%	
Colorado 6	Daniel Schaefer	Republican	1983 (special)	Incumbent re-elected.	▌ ✓ Daniel Schaefer (Republican) 65.0%; ▌Chuck Norris (Democratic) 33.5%; ▌John Heckman (Independent) 1.5%	

== Connecticut ==
District	Incumbent	Party	First elected	Result	Candidates
Connecticut 1	Barbara B. Kennelly	Democratic	1982	Incumbent re-elected.	▌ ✓ Barbara B. Kennelly (Democratic) 74.2%; ▌Herschel A. Klein (Republican) 25.4%; ▌Sally F. Cadmus (Independent) 0.4%
Connecticut 2	Sam Gejdenson	Democratic	1980	Incumbent re-elected.	▌ ✓ Sam Gejdenson (Democratic) 67.4%; ▌Francis M. Mullen (Republican) 32.6%
Connecticut 3	Bruce Morrison	Democratic	1982	Incumbent re-elected.	▌ ✓ Bruce Morrison (Democratic) 69.6%; ▌Ernest J. Diette Jr. (Republican) 30.4%
Connecticut 4	Stewart McKinney	Republican	1970	Incumbent re-elected.	▌ ✓ Stewart McKinney (Republican) 53.5%; ▌Christine Niedermeier (Democratic) 46.5%
Connecticut 5	John G. Rowland	Republican	1984	Incumbent re-elected.	▌ ✓ John G. Rowland (Republican) 60.9%; ▌Jim Cohen (Democratic) 39.1%
Connecticut 6	Nancy Johnson	Republican	1982	Incumbent re-elected.	▌ ✓ Nancy Johnson (Republican) 64.2%; ▌Paul S. Amenta (Democratic) 35.8%

== Delaware ==
District	Incumbent	Party	First elected	Result	Candidates
Delaware at-large	Tom Carper	Democratic	1982	Incumbent re-elected.	▌ ✓ Tom Carper (Democratic) 66.2%; ▌Thomas S. Neuberger (Republican) 33.4%; ▌Patrick F. Harrison (American) 0.4%

== Florida ==
District	Incumbent	Party	First elected	Result	Candidates
Florida 1	Earl Hutto	Democratic	1978	Incumbent re-elected.	▌ ✓ Earl Hutto (Democratic) 63.8%; ▌Greg Neubeck (Republican) 36.2%
Florida 2	Don Fuqua	Democratic	1962	Incumbent retired. Democratic hold.	▌ ✓ Bill Grant (Democratic) Uncontested
Florida 3	Charles E. Bennett	Democratic	1948	Incumbent re-elected.	▌ ✓ Charles E. Bennett (Democratic) Uncontested
Florida 4	Bill Chappell	Democratic	1968	Incumbent re-elected.	▌ ✓ Bill Chappell (Democratic) Uncontested
Florida 5	Bill McCollum	Republican	1980	Incumbent re-elected.	▌ ✓ Bill McCollum (Republican) Uncontested
Florida 6	Buddy MacKay	Democratic	1982	Incumbent re-elected.	▌ ✓ Buddy MacKay (Democratic) 70.2%; ▌Larry Gallagher (Republican) 29.8%
Florida 7	Sam Gibbons	Democratic	1962	Incumbent re-elected.	▌ ✓ Sam Gibbons (Democratic) Uncontested
Florida 8	Bill Young	Republican	1970	Incumbent re-elected.	▌ ✓ Bill Young (Republican) Uncontested
Florida 9	Michael Bilirakis	Republican	1982	Incumbent re-elected.	▌ ✓ Michael Bilirakis (Republican) 70.8%; ▌Gabe Cazares (Democratic) 29.2%
Florida 10	Andy Ireland	Republican	1976	Incumbent re-elected.	▌ ✓ Andy Ireland (Republican) 71.2%; ▌David B. Higginbottom (Democratic) 28.8%
Florida 11	Bill Nelson	Democratic	1978	Incumbent re-elected.	▌ ✓ Bill Nelson (Democratic) 72.7%; ▌Scott Ellis (Republican) 27.3%
Florida 12	Tom Lewis	Republican	1982	Incumbent re-elected.	▌ ✓ Tom Lewis (Republican) 99.4%
Florida 13	Connie Mack III	Republican	1982	Incumbent re-elected.	▌ ✓ Connie Mack III (Republican) 75.0%; ▌Addison S. Gilbert III (Democratic) 25.0%
Florida 14	Dan Mica	Democratic	1978	Incumbent re-elected.	▌ ✓ Dan Mica (Democratic) 73.8%; ▌Rick Martin (Republican) 26.2%
Florida 15	Clay Shaw	Republican	1980	Incumbent re-elected.	▌ ✓ Clay Shaw (Republican) Uncontested
Florida 16	Lawrence J. Smith	Democratic	1982	Incumbent re-elected.	▌ ✓ Lawrence J. Smith (Democratic) 69.7%; ▌Mary Collins (Republican) 30.3%
Florida 17	William Lehman	Democratic	1972	Incumbent re-elected.	▌ ✓ William Lehman (Democratic) Uncontested
Florida 18	Claude Pepper	Democratic	1962	Incumbent re-elected.	▌ ✓ Claude Pepper (Democratic) 73.5%; ▌Tom Brodie (Republican) 26.5%
Florida 19	Dante Fascell	Democratic	1954	Incumbent re-elected.	▌ ✓ Dante Fascell (Democratic) 69.1%; ▌Bill Flanagan (Republican) 30.9%

== Georgia ==
District	Incumbent	Party	First elected	Result	Candidates
Georgia 1	Lindsay Thomas	Democratic	1982	Incumbent re-elected.	▌ ✓ Lindsay Thomas (Democratic) 100%
Georgia 2	Charles Hatcher	Democratic	1980	Incumbent re-elected.	▌ ✓ Charles Hatcher (Democratic) 100%
Georgia 3	Richard Ray	Democratic	1982	Incumbent re-elected.	▌ ✓ Richard Ray (Democratic) 99.7%
Georgia 4	Pat Swindall	Republican	1984	Incumbent re-elected.	▌ ✓ Pat Swindall (Republican) 53.2%; ▌Ben Jones (Democratic) 46.8%
Georgia 5	Wyche Fowler	Democratic	1977 (special)	Incumbent retired to run for U.S. Senator. Democratic hold.	▌ ✓ John Lewis (Democratic) 75.3%; ▌Portia A. Scott (Republican) 24.7%
Georgia 6	Newt Gingrich	Republican	1978	Incumbent re-elected.	▌ ✓ Newt Gingrich (Republican) 59.5%; ▌Crandle Bray (Democratic) 40.5%
Georgia 7	George Darden	Democratic	1983 (special)	Incumbent re-elected.	▌ ✓ George Darden (Democratic) 66.4%; ▌Joe Morecraft (Republican) 33.6%
Georgia 8	J. Roy Rowland	Democratic	1982	Incumbent re-elected.	▌ ✓ J. Roy Rowland (Democratic) 86.4%; ▌Eddie McDowell (Republican) 13.6%
Georgia 9	Ed Jenkins	Democratic	1976	Incumbent re-elected.	▌ ✓ Ed Jenkins (Democratic) 100%
Georgia 10	Doug Barnard Jr.	Democratic	1976	Incumbent re-elected.	▌ ✓ Doug Barnard Jr. (Democratic) 67.3%; ▌Jim Hill (Republican) 32.7%

== Hawaii ==
District	Incumbent	Party	First elected	Result	Candidates
Hawaii 1	Neil Abercrombie	Democratic	1986 (special)	Incumbent lost renomination. Republican gain.	▌ ✓ Pat Saiki (Republican) 59.2%; ▌Mufi Hannemann (Democratic) 37.5%; ▌Blase Harris (Libertarian) 3.3%
Hawaii 2	Daniel Akaka	Democratic	1976	Incumbent re-elected.	▌ ✓ Daniel Akaka (Democratic) 76.1%; ▌Maria M. Hustace (Republican) 21.7%; ▌Ken Schoolland (Libertarian) 2.2%

== Idaho ==
District	Incumbent	Party	First elected	Result	Candidates
Idaho 1	Larry Craig	Republican	1980	Incumbent re-elected.	▌ ✓ Larry Craig (Republican) 65.1%; ▌Bill Currie (Democratic) 32.3%; ▌David W. Shepherd (Independent) 2.6%
Idaho 2	Richard H. Stallings	Democratic	1984	Incumbent re-elected.	▌ ✓ Richard H. Stallings (Democratic) 54.4%; ▌Mel Richardson (Republican) 45.6%

== Illinois ==
District	Incumbent	Party	First elected	Result	Candidates
Illinois 1	Charles Hayes	Democratic	1983 (special)	Incumbent re-elected.	▌ ✓ Charles Hayes (Democratic) 96.4%; ▌Joseph C. Faulkner (Republican) 3.6%
Illinois 2	Gus Savage	Democratic	1980	Incumbent re-elected.	▌ ✓ Gus Savage (Democratic) 83.8%; ▌Ron Taylor (Republican) 16.2%
Illinois 3	Marty Russo	Democratic	1974	Incumbent re-elected.	▌ ✓ Marty Russo (Democratic) 66.2%; ▌James J. Tierney (Republican) 33.8%
Illinois 4	George M. O'Brien	Republican	1972	Incumbent died. Republican hold.	▌ ✓ Jack Davis (Republican) 51.6%; ▌Shawn Collins (Democratic) 48.4%
Illinois 5	Bill Lipinski	Democratic	1982	Incumbent re-elected.	▌ ✓ Bill Lipinski (Democratic) 70.4%; ▌Daniel John Sobieski (Republican) 29.6%
Illinois 6	Henry Hyde	Republican	1974	Incumbent re-elected.	▌ ✓ Henry Hyde (Republican) 75.4%; ▌Robert H. Renshaw (Democratic) 24.6%
Illinois 7	Cardiss Collins	Democratic	1973 (special)	Incumbent re-elected.	▌ ✓ Cardiss Collins (Democratic) 80.2%; ▌Caroline K. Kallas (Republican) 18.6%; ▌Jerald Wilson (Independent) 1.2%
Illinois 8	Dan Rostenkowski	Democratic	1958	Incumbent re-elected.	▌ ✓ Dan Rostenkowski (Democratic) 78.7%; ▌Thomas J. DeFazio (Republican) 21.3%
Illinois 9	Sidney R. Yates	Democratic	1948; 1962 (retired); 1964	Incumbent re-elected.	▌ ✓ Sidney R. Yates (Democratic) 71.6%; ▌Herbert Sohn (Republican) 28.4%
Illinois 10	John Porter	Republican	1980	Incumbent re-elected.	▌ ✓ John Porter (Republican) 75.1%; ▌Robert A. Cleland (Democratic) 24.9%
Illinois 11	Frank Annunzio	Democratic	1964	Incumbent re-elected.	▌ ✓ Frank Annunzio (Democratic) 70.7%; ▌George S. Gottlieb (Republican) 29.3%
Illinois 12	Phil Crane	Republican	1969 (special)	Incumbent re-elected.	▌ ✓ Phil Crane (Republican) 77.7%; ▌John A. Leonardi (Democratic) 22.3%
Illinois 13	Harris W. Fawell	Republican	1984	Incumbent re-elected.	▌ ✓ Harris W. Fawell (Republican) 73.4%; ▌Dominick J. Jeffrey (Democratic) 26.6%
Illinois 14	John E. Grotberg	Republican	1984	Incumbent retired. Republican hold.	▌ ✓ Dennis Hastert (Republican) 52.4%; ▌Mary Lou Kearns (Democratic) 47.6%
Illinois 15	Ed Madigan	Republican	1972	Incumbent re-elected.	▌ ✓ Ed Madigan (Republican) Uncontested
Illinois 16	Lynn M. Martin	Republican	1980	Incumbent re-elected.	▌ ✓ Lynn M. Martin (Republican) 66.9%; ▌Kenneth F. Bohnsack (Democratic) 33.1%
Illinois 17	Lane Evans	Democratic	1982	Incumbent re-elected.	▌ ✓ Lane Evans (Democratic) 55.6%; ▌Sam McHard (Republican) 44.4%
Illinois 18	Bob Michel	Republican	1956	Incumbent re-elected.	▌ ✓ Bob Michel (Republican) 62.6%; ▌Jim Dawson (Democratic) 37.4%
Illinois 19	Terry L. Bruce	Democratic	1984	Incumbent re-elected.	▌ ✓ Terry L. Bruce (Democratic) 66.4%; ▌Al Salvi (Republican) 33.6%
Illinois 20	Dick Durbin	Democratic	1982	Incumbent re-elected.	▌ ✓ Dick Durbin (Democratic) 68.1%; ▌Kevin B. McCarthy (Republican) 31.9%
Illinois 21	Melvin Price	Democratic	1944	Incumbent re-elected.	▌ ✓ Melvin Price (Democratic) 50.4%; ▌Robert H. Gaffner (Republican) 49.6%
Illinois 22	Kenneth J. Gray	Democratic	1954; 1974 (retired); 1984	Incumbent re-elected.	▌ ✓ Kenneth J. Gray (Democratic) 53.2%; ▌Randy Patchett (Republican) 46.8%

== Indiana ==
District	Incumbent	Party	First elected	Result	Candidates
Indiana 1	Pete Visclosky	Democratic	1984	Incumbent re-elected.	▌ ✓ Pete Visclosky (Democratic) 73.3%; ▌William Costas (Republican) 25.6%; ▌James E. Willis (Libertarian) 0.7%; ▌Tracy Kyle (Workers League) 0.3%
Indiana 2	Philip Sharp	Democratic	1974	Incumbent re-elected.	▌ ✓ Philip Sharp (Democratic) 61.9%; ▌Donald Lynch (Republican) 37.4%; ▌Richard Smith (Libertarian) 0.7%
Indiana 3	John P. Hiler	Republican	1980	Incumbent re-elected.	▌ ✓ John P. Hiler (Republican) 49.8%; ▌Thomas Ward (Democratic) 49.8%; ▌Ken Donnelly (Libertarian) 0.4%
Indiana 4	Dan Coats	Republican	1980	Incumbent re-elected.	▌ ✓ Dan Coats (Republican) 69.6%; ▌Greg Scher (Democratic) 30.0%; ▌Stephen Dasbach (Libertarian) 0.4%
Indiana 5	Elwood Hillis	Republican	1970	Incumbent retired. Democratic gain.	▌ ✓ Jim Jontz (Democratic) 51.4%; ▌James Butcher (Republican) 48.1%; ▌Brent Waibel (Libertarian) 0.5%
Indiana 6	Dan Burton	Republican	1982	Incumbent re-elected.	▌ ✓ Dan Burton (Republican) 68.4%; ▌Thomas McKenna (Democratic) 30.9%; ▌Pamela Webe (Libertarian) 0.8%
Indiana 7	John T. Myers	Republican	1966	Incumbent re-elected.	▌ ✓ John T. Myers (Republican) 66.8%; ▌A. Eugene Smith (Democratic) 31.6%; ▌Barbara J. Bourland (Libertarian) 1.6%
Indiana 8	Frank McCloskey	Democratic	1982	Incumbent re-elected.	▌ ✓ Frank McCloskey (Democratic) 53.0%; ▌Rick McIntyre (Republican) 46.5%; ▌Marilyn Stone (Libertarian) 0.5%
Indiana 9	Lee Hamilton	Democratic	1964	Incumbent re-elected.	▌ ✓ Lee Hamilton (Democratic) 71.9%; ▌Robert W. Kilroy (Republican) 27.7%; ▌Douglas S. Boggs (Libertarian) 0.4%
Indiana 10	Andrew Jacobs Jr.	Democratic	1964; 1972 (defeated); 1974	Incumbent re-elected.	▌ ✓ Andrew Jacobs Jr. (Democratic) 57.7%; ▌Jim Eynon (Republican) 41.2%; ▌Frederick Peterson (Libertarian) 1.1%

== Iowa ==
District	Incumbent	Party	First elected	Result	Candidates
Iowa 1	Jim Leach	Republican	1976	Incumbent re-elected.	▌ ✓ Jim Leach (Republican) 66.4%; ▌John R. Whitaker (Democratic) 33.6%
Iowa 2	Tom Tauke	Republican	1978	Incumbent re-elected.	▌ ✓ Tom Tauke (Republican) 61.3%; ▌Eric Tabor (Democratic) 38.7%
Iowa 3	T. Cooper Evans	Republican	1980	Incumbent retired. Democratic gain.	▌ ✓ David R. Nagle (Democratic) 54.6%; ▌John McIntee (Republican) 45.4%
Iowa 4	Neal Smith	Democratic	1958	Incumbent re-elected.	▌ ✓ Neal Smith (Democratic) 68.4%; ▌Robert R. Lockard (Republican) 31.6%
Iowa 5	Jim Ross Lightfoot	Republican	1984	Incumbent re-elected.	▌ ✓ Jim Ross Lightfoot (Republican) 59.2%; ▌Scott Hughes (Democratic) 40.8%
Iowa 6	Berkley Bedell	Democratic	1974	Incumbent retired. Republican gain.	▌ ✓ Fred Grandy (Republican) 51.0%; ▌Clayton Hodgson (Democratic) 49.0%

== Kansas ==
District	Incumbent	Party	First elected	Result	Candidates
Kansas 1	Pat Roberts	Republican	1980	Incumbent re-elected.	▌ ✓ Pat Roberts (Republican) 76.5%; ▌Dale Lyon (Democratic) 23.5%
Kansas 2	Jim Slattery	Democratic	1982	Incumbent re-elected.	▌ ✓ Jim Slattery (Democratic) 70.6%; ▌Phill Kline (Republican) 29.4%
Kansas 3	Jan Meyers	Republican	1984	Incumbent re-elected.	▌ ✓ Jan Meyers (Republican) Uncontested
Kansas 4	Dan Glickman	Democratic	1976	Incumbent re-elected.	▌ ✓ Dan Glickman (Democratic) 64.5%; ▌Bob Knight (Republican) 35.5%
Kansas 5	Bob Whittaker	Republican	1978	Incumbent re-elected.	▌ ✓ Bob Whittaker (Republican) 71.1%; ▌Kim E. Myers (Democratic) 28.9%

== Kentucky ==
District	Incumbent	Party	First elected	Result	Candidates
Kentucky 1	Carroll Hubbard	Democratic	1974	Incumbent re-elected.	▌ ✓ Carroll Hubbard (Democratic) 100%
Kentucky 2	William Natcher	Democratic	1953 (special)	Incumbent re-elected.	▌ ✓ William Natcher (Democratic) 100%
Kentucky 3	Romano Mazzoli	Democratic	1970	Incumbent re-elected.	▌ ✓ Romano Mazzoli (Democratic) 73.0%; ▌Lee Holmes (Republican) 26.2%; ▌Estelle DeBates (Socialist Workers) 0.8%
Kentucky 4	Gene Snyder	Republican	1962; 1964 (lost); 1966	Incumbent retired. Republican hold.	▌ ✓ Jim Bunning (Republican) 55.1%; ▌Terry L. Mann (Democratic) 43.9%; Others: ▌Walter T. Marksberry (Independent) 0.6%; ▌W. Ed Parker (American) 0.4%
Kentucky 5	Hal Rogers	Republican	1980	Incumbent re-elected.	▌ ✓ Hal Rogers (Republican) 100%
Kentucky 6	Larry J. Hopkins	Republican	1978	Incumbent re-elected.	▌ ✓ Larry J. Hopkins (Republican) 74.3%; ▌Jerry Hammond (Democratic) 25.7%
Kentucky 7	Chris Perkins	Democratic	1984	Incumbent re-elected.	▌ ✓ Chris Perkins (Democratic) 79.6%; ▌James T. Polley (Republican) 20.4%

== Louisiana ==
Lindy Boggs and Jerry Huckaby won more than 50% of the vote in their Sept. 27 jungle primaries. Bob Livingston, Billy Tauzin and Buddy Roemer were automatically re-elected without appearing on a ballot. In the 7th and 8th districts, runoffs were required when no candidate received a majority in the jungle primary.

District	Incumbent	Party	First elected	Result	Candidates
Louisiana 1	Bob Livingston	Republican	1977 (special)	Incumbent re-elected.	▌ ✓ Bob Livingston (Republican) Uncontested
Louisiana 2	Lindy Boggs	Democratic	1973 (special)	Incumbent re-elected.	▌ ✓ Lindy Boggs (Democratic) 90.7%; ▌Roger C. Johnson (Republican) 7.3%; ▌Landi Dyess (Independent) 2.1%
Louisiana 3	Billy Tauzin	Democratic	1980	Incumbent re-elected.	▌ ✓ Billy Tauzin (Democratic) Uncontested
Louisiana 4	Buddy Roemer	Democratic	1980	Incumbent re-elected.	▌ ✓ Buddy Roemer (Democratic) Uncontested
Louisiana 5	Jerry Huckaby	Democratic	1976	Incumbent re-elected.	▌ ✓ Jerry Huckaby (Democratic) 68.5%; ▌Bud Brady (Democratic) 23.0%; ▌Fred W. Huenefeld Jr. (Democratic) 8.5%
Louisiana 6	Henson Moore	Republican	1974	Incumbent retired to run for U.S. Senator. Republican hold.	▌ ✓ Richard Baker (Republican) 50.1%; ▌Thomas H. Hudson (Democratic) 45.0%; ▌Willis E. Blackwell (Democratic) 4.1%
Louisiana 7	John Breaux	Democratic	1972	Incumbent retired to run for U.S. Senator. Democratic hold.	▌ ✓ Jimmy Hayes (Democratic) 57.0%; ▌Margaret Lowenthal (Democratic) 43.0%
Louisiana 8	Catherine Small Long	Democratic	1985 (special)	Incumbent retired. Republican gain.	▌ ✓ Clyde C. Holloway (Republican) 51.4%; ▌Faye Williams (Democratic) 48.6%

== Maine ==
District	Incumbent	Party	First elected	Result	Candidates
Maine 1	John R. McKernan Jr.	Republican	1982	Incumbent retired to run for Governor of Maine. Democratic gain.	▌ ✓ Joseph E. Brennan (Democratic) 53.2%; ▌H. Rollin Ives (Republican) 43.7%; ▌Plato Truman (Labor) 3.1%
Maine 2	Olympia Snowe	Republican	1978	Incumbent re-elected.	▌ ✓ Olympia Snowe (Republican) 77.3%; ▌Richard R. Charette (Democratic) 22.7%

== Maryland ==
District	Incumbent	Party	First elected	Result	Candidates
Maryland 1	Roy Dyson	Democratic	1980	Incumbent re-elected.	▌ ✓ Roy Dyson (Democratic) 66.8%; ▌Harlan C. Williams (Republican) 33.2%
Maryland 2	Helen Delich Bentley	Republican	1984	Incumbent re-elected.	▌ ✓ Helen Delich Bentley (Republican) 58.7%; ▌Clarence Long (Democratic) 41.3%
Maryland 3	Barbara Mikulski	Democratic	1976	Incumbent retired to run for U.S. Senator. Democratic hold.	▌ ✓ Ben Cardin (Democratic) 79.1%; ▌Ross Z. Pierpont (Republican) 20.9%
Maryland 4	Marjorie Holt	Republican	1972	Incumbent retired. Democratic gain.	▌ ✓ Tom McMillen (Democratic) 50.2%; ▌Robert R. Neall (Republican) 49.8%
Maryland 5	Steny Hoyer	Democratic	1981 (special)	Incumbent re-elected.	▌ ✓ Steny Hoyer (Democratic) 81.9%; ▌John Eugene Sellner (Republican) 18.1%
Maryland 6	Beverly Byron	Democratic	1978	Incumbent re-elected.	▌ ✓ Beverly Byron (Democratic) 72.2%; ▌John Vandenberge (Republican) 27.8%
Maryland 7	Parren Mitchell	Democratic	1970	Incumbent retired. Democratic hold.	▌ ✓ Kweisi Mfume (Democratic) 86.7%; ▌Saint George Crosse (Republican) 13.3%
Maryland 8	Michael D. Barnes	Democratic	1978	Incumbent retired to run for U.S. Senator. Republican gain.	▌ ✓ Connie Morella (Republican) 52.9%; ▌Stewart Bainum Jr. (Democratic) 47.1%

== Massachusetts ==
District	Incumbent	Party	First elected	Result	Candidates
Massachusetts 1	Silvio O. Conte	Republican	1958	Incumbent re-elected.	▌ ✓ Silvio O. Conte (Republican) 77.8%; ▌Robert S. Weiner (Democratic) 22.1%
Massachusetts 2	Edward Boland	Democratic	1952	Incumbent re-elected.	▌ ✓ Edward Boland (Democratic) 65.9%; ▌Brian Lees (Republican) 34.1%
Massachusetts 3	Joseph D. Early	Democratic	1974	Incumbent re-elected.	▌ ✓ Joseph D. Early (Democratic) 100%
Massachusetts 4	Barney Frank	Democratic	1980	Incumbent re-elected.	▌ ✓ Barney Frank (Democratic) 88.8%; ▌Thomas D. DeVisscher (Republican) 11.1%
Massachusetts 5	Chester G. Atkins	Democratic	1984	Incumbent re-elected.	▌ ✓ Chester G. Atkins (Democratic) 100%
Massachusetts 6	Nicholas Mavroules	Democratic	1978	Incumbent re-elected.	▌ ✓ Nicholas Mavroules (Democratic) 99.9%
Massachusetts 7	Ed Markey	Democratic	1976	Incumbent re-elected.	▌ ✓ Ed Markey (Democratic) 100%
Massachusetts 8	Tip O'Neill	Democratic	1952	Incumbent retired. Democratic hold.	▌ ✓ Joseph P. Kennedy II (Democratic) 72.0%; ▌Clark C. Abt (Republican) 27.7%
Massachusetts 9	Joe Moakley	Democratic	1972	Incumbent re-elected.	▌ ✓ Joe Moakley (Democratic) 83.8%; ▌Robert W. Horan (Independent) 16.2%
Massachusetts 10	Gerry Studds	Democratic	1972	Incumbent re-elected.	▌ ✓ Gerry Studds (Democratic) 65.1%; ▌Ricardo M. Barros (Republican) 26.5%; ▌Alexander Byron (Independent) 8.4%
Massachusetts 11	Brian J. Donnelly	Democratic	1978	Incumbent re-elected.	▌ ✓ Brian J. Donnelly (Democratic) 100%

== Michigan ==
District	Incumbent	Party	First elected	Result	Candidates
Michigan 1	John Conyers	Democratic	1964	Incumbent re-elected.	▌ ✓ John Conyers (Democratic) 89.2%; ▌Bill Ashe (Republican) 9.8%; ▌Peter Banta Bowen (Independent) 0.5%; ▌Andrew Pulley (Independent) 0.5%
Michigan 2	Carl Pursell	Republican	1976	Incumbent re-elected.	▌ ✓ Carl Pursell (Republican) 59.0%; ▌Dean Baker (Democratic) 41.0%
Michigan 3	Howard Wolpe	Democratic	1978	Incumbent re-elected.	▌ ✓ Howard Wolpe (Democratic) 60.4%; ▌Jackie McGregor (Republican) 39.6%
Michigan 4	Mark D. Siljander	Republican	1981 (special)	Incumbent lost renomination. Republican hold.	▌ ✓ Fred Upton (Republican) 61.9%; ▌Dan Roche (Democratic) 36.6%; ▌Richard H. Gillmor (Independent) 1.5%
Michigan 5	Paul B. Henry	Republican	1984	Incumbent re-elected.	▌ ✓ Paul B. Henry (Republican) 71.2%; ▌Teresa S. Decker (Democratic) 28.8%
Michigan 6	Bob Carr	Democratic	1974; 1980 (defeated); 1982	Incumbent re-elected.	▌ ✓ Bob Carr (Democratic) 56.7%; ▌James Whitney Dunn (Republican) 43.3%
Michigan 7	Dale Kildee	Democratic	1976	Incumbent re-elected.	▌ ✓ Dale Kildee (Democratic) 79.6%; ▌Trudie Callahan (Republican) 19.5%; ▌Gene Schenk (Independent) 0.9%
Michigan 8	J. Bob Traxler	Democratic	1974	Incumbent re-elected.	▌ ✓ J. Bob Traxler (Democratic) 72.6%; ▌John A. Levi (Republican) 27.4%
Michigan 9	Guy Vander Jagt	Republican	1966	Incumbent re-elected.	▌ ✓ Guy Vander Jagt (Republican) 64.4%; ▌Richard J. Anderson (Democratic) 35.6%
Michigan 10	Bill Schuette	Republican	1984	Incumbent re-elected.	▌ ✓ Bill Schuette (Republican) 51.2%; ▌Donald J. Albosta (Democratic) 48.8%
Michigan 11	Bob Davis	Republican	1978	Incumbent re-elected.	▌ ✓ Bob Davis (Republican) 63.0%; ▌Robert C. Anderson (Democratic) 36.6%; ▌Phil Bellfy (Independent) 0.4%
Michigan 12	David Bonior	Democratic	1976	Incumbent re-elected.	▌ ✓ David Bonior (Democratic) 66.4%; ▌Candice S. Miller (Republican) 33.6%
Michigan 13	George Crockett Jr.	Democratic	1980	Incumbent re-elected.	▌ ✓ George Crockett Jr. (Democratic) 85.2%; ▌Mary Griffin (Republican) 13.8%; ▌Barbara L. Putnam (Independent) 0.7%; ▌Lucy Bell Randolph (Independent) 0.4%
Michigan 14	Dennis M. Hertel	Democratic	1980	Incumbent re-elected.	▌ ✓ Dennis M. Hertel (Democratic) 72.9%; ▌Stanley T. Grot (Republican) 26.7%; ▌William Osipoff (Independent) 0.4%
Michigan 15	William D. Ford	Democratic	1964	Incumbent re-elected.	▌ ✓ William D. Ford (Democratic) 75.2%; ▌Glen Kassel (Republican) 24.2%; ▌James H. Stamps (Independent) 0.6%
Michigan 16	John Dingell	Democratic	1955 (special)	Incumbent re-elected.	▌ ✓ John Dingell (Democratic) 77.8%; ▌Frank Grzywacki (Republican) 22.2%
Michigan 17	Sander Levin	Democratic	1982	Incumbent re-elected.	▌ ✓ Sander Levin (Democratic) 76.4%; ▌Calvin Williams (Republican) 22.5%; ▌Charles E. Martell (Independent) 1.1%
Michigan 18	William Broomfield	Republican	1956	Incumbent re-elected.	▌ ✓ William Broomfield (Republican) 73.8%; ▌Gary L. Kohut (Democratic) 26.2%

== Minnesota ==
District	Incumbent	Party	First elected	Result	Candidates
Minnesota 1	Tim Penny	DFL	1982	Incumbent re-elected.	▌ ✓ Tim Penny (DFL) 72.4%; ▌Paul H. Grawe (Ind.-Republican) 27.6%
Minnesota 2	Vin Weber	Independent- Republican	1980	Incumbent re-elected.	▌ ✓ Vin Weber (Ind.-Republican) 51.6%; ▌Dave Johnson (DFL) 48.4%
Minnesota 3	Bill Frenzel	Independent- Republican	1970	Incumbent re-elected.	▌ ✓ Bill Frenzel (Ind.-Republican) 70.1%; ▌Ray Stock (DFL) 29.9%
Minnesota 4	Bruce Vento	DFL	1976	Incumbent re-elected.	▌ ✓ Bruce Vento (DFL) 72.9%; ▌Harold Stassen (Ind.-Republican) 27.1%
Minnesota 5	Martin Olav Sabo	DFL	1978	Incumbent re-elected.	▌ ✓ Martin Olav Sabo (DFL) 72.7%; ▌Rick Serra (Ind.-Republican) 25.9%; ▌Clifford Mark Greene (Independent) 1.4%
Minnesota 6	Gerry Sikorski	DFL	1982	Incumbent re-elected.	▌ ✓ Gerry Sikorski (DFL) 65.8%; ▌Barb Sykora (Ind.-Republican) 34.2%
Minnesota 7	Arlan Stangeland	Independent- Republican	1977 (special)	Incumbent re-elected.	▌ ✓ Arlan Stangeland (Ind.-Republican) 49.7%; ▌Collin Peterson (DFL) 49.6%; ▌Jon Hall (Citizens) 0.7%
Minnesota 8	Jim Oberstar	DFL	1974	Incumbent re-elected.	▌ ✓ Jim Oberstar (DFL) 72.6%; ▌Dave Rued (Ind.-Republican) 27.4%

== Mississippi ==
District	Incumbent	Party	First elected	Result	Candidates
Mississippi 1	Jamie Whitten	Democratic	1941 (special)	Incumbent re-elected.	▌ ✓ Jamie Whitten (Democratic) 66.4%; ▌Larry Cobb (Republican) 33.6%
Mississippi 2	Webb Franklin	Republican	1982	Incumbent lost re-election. Democratic gain.	▌ ✓ Mike Espy (Democratic) 51.7%; ▌Webb Franklin (Republican) 48.3%
Mississippi 3	Sonny Montgomery	Democratic	1966	Incumbent re-elected.	▌ ✓ Sonny Montgomery (Democratic) Uncontested
Mississippi 4	Wayne Dowdy	Democratic	1981 (special)	Incumbent re-elected.	▌ ✓ Wayne Dowdy (Democratic) 71.5%; ▌Gail Healy (Republican) 28.5%
Mississippi 5	Trent Lott	Republican	1972	Incumbent re-elected.	▌ ✓ Trent Lott (Republican) 82.3%; ▌Larry L. Albritton (Democratic) 17.7%

== Missouri ==
District	Incumbent	Party	First elected	Result	Candidates
Missouri 1	Bill Clay	Democratic	1968	Incumbent re-elected.	▌ ✓ Bill Clay (Democratic) 66.1%; ▌Robert J. Wittmann (Republican) 33.9%
Missouri 2	Robert A. Young	Democratic	1976	Incumbent lost re-election. Republican gain.	▌ ✓ Jack Buechner (Republican) 51.9%; ▌Robert A. Young (Democratic) 48.1%
Missouri 3	Dick Gephardt	Democratic	1976	Incumbent re-elected.	▌ ✓ Dick Gephardt (Democratic) 69.0%; ▌Roy Amelung (Republican) 31.0%
Missouri 4	Ike Skelton	Democratic	1976	Incumbent re-elected.	▌ ✓ Ike Skelton (Democratic) Uncontested
Missouri 5	Alan Wheat	Democratic	1982	Incumbent re-elected.	▌ ✓ Alan Wheat (Democratic) 70.9%; ▌Greg Fisher (Republican) 27.6%; ▌Jay Manifold (Libertarian) 1.5%
Missouri 6	Tom Coleman	Republican	1976	Incumbent re-elected.	▌ ✓ Tom Coleman (Republican) 56.7%; ▌Doug R. Hughes (Democratic) 43.3%
Missouri 7	Gene Taylor	Republican	1972	Incumbent re-elected.	▌ ✓ Gene Taylor (Republican) 67.0%; ▌Ken Young (Democratic) 33.0%
Missouri 8	Bill Emerson	Republican	1980	Incumbent re-elected.	▌ ✓ Bill Emerson (Republican) 52.5%; ▌Wayne Cryts (Democratic) 47.5%
Missouri 9	Harold Volkmer	Democratic	1976	Incumbent re-elected.	▌ ✓ Harold Volkmer (Democratic) 57.5%; ▌Ralph Uthlaut Jr. (Republican) 42.5%

== Montana ==
District	Incumbent	Party	First elected	Result	Candidates
Montana 1	Pat Williams	Democratic	1978	Incumbent re-elected.	▌ ✓ Pat Williams (Democratic) 61.7%; ▌Don Allen (Republican) 38.3%
Montana 2	Ron Marlenee	Republican	1976	Incumbent re-elected.	▌ ✓ Ron Marlenee (Republican) 53.5%; ▌Buck O'Brien (Democratic) 46.5%

== Nebraska ==
District	Incumbent	Party	First elected	Result	Candidates
Nebraska 1	Doug Bereuter	Republican	1978	Incumbent re-elected.	▌ ✓ Doug Bereuter (Republican) 64.5%; ▌Steve Burns (Democratic) 35.5%
Nebraska 2	Hal Daub	Republican	1980	Incumbent re-elected.	▌ ✓ Hal Daub (Republican) 58.6%; ▌Walter M. Calinger (Democratic) 41.4%
Nebraska 3	Virginia D. Smith	Republican	1974	Incumbent re-elected.	▌ ✓ Virginia D. Smith (Republican) 69.8%; ▌Scott E. Sidwell (Democratic) 30.2%

== Nevada ==
District	Incumbent	Party	First elected	Result	Candidates
Nevada 1	Harry Reid	Democratic	1982	Incumbent retired to run for U.S. Senator. Democratic hold.	▌ ✓ James Bilbray (Democratic) 54.1%; ▌Bob Ryan (Republican) 44.0%; ▌Gordon Michael Morris (Libertarian) 1.9%
Nevada 2	Barbara Vucanovich	Republican	1982	Incumbent re-elected.	▌ ✓ Barbara Vucanovich (Republican) 58.4%; ▌Pete Sferrazza (Democratic) 41.6%

== New Hampshire ==
District	Incumbent	Party	First elected	Result	Candidates
New Hampshire 1	Bob Smith	Republican	1984	Incumbent re-elected.	▌ ✓ Bob Smith (Republican) 56.4%; ▌James M. Demers (Democratic) 43.6%
New Hampshire 2	Judd Gregg	Republican	1980	Incumbent re-elected.	▌ ✓ Judd Gregg (Republican) 74.2%; ▌Lawrence Craig-Green (Democratic) 25.8%

== New Jersey ==
District	Incumbent	Party	First elected	Result	Candidates
New Jersey 1	James Florio	Democratic	1974	Incumbent re-elected.	▌ ✓ James Florio (Democratic) 75.6%; ▌Frederick A. Busch Jr. (Republican) 23.6%; ▌Jerry Zeldin (Libertarian) 0.8%
New Jersey 2	William J. Hughes	Democratic	1974	Incumbent re-elected.	▌ ✓ William J. Hughes (Democratic) 68.3%; ▌Alfred J. Bennington Jr. (Republican) 28.6%; ▌Len Smith (Pro-Life) 3.1%
New Jersey 3	James J. Howard	Democratic	1964	Incumbent re-elected.	▌ ✓ James J. Howard (Democratic) 58.7%; ▌Brian T. Kennedy (Republican) 41.3%
New Jersey 4	Chris Smith	Republican	1980	Incumbent re-elected.	▌ ✓ Chris Smith (Republican) 61.1%; ▌Jeffrey Laurenti (Democratic) 38.3%; ▌Earl G. Dickey (Independent) 0.6%
New Jersey 5	Marge Roukema	Republican	1980	Incumbent re-elected.	▌ ✓ Marge Roukema (Republican) 68.0%; ▌H. Vernon Jolley (Democratic) 32.0%
New Jersey 6	Bernard J. Dwyer	Democratic	1980	Incumbent re-elected.	▌ ✓ Bernard J. Dwyer (Democratic) 69.0%; ▌John D. Scalamonti (Republican) 28.9%; ▌Rose Monyek (Independent) 2.1%
New Jersey 7	Matthew J. Rinaldo	Republican	1972	Incumbent re-elected.	▌ ✓ Matthew J. Rinaldo (Republican) 79.0%; ▌June S. Fischer (Democratic) 21.0%
New Jersey 8	Robert A. Roe	Democratic	1970	Incumbent re-elected.	▌ ✓ Robert A. Roe (Democratic) 62.8%; ▌Thomas P. Zampino (Republican) 37.2%
New Jersey 9	Robert Torricelli	Democratic	1982	Incumbent re-elected.	▌ ✓ Robert Torricelli (Democratic) 69.0%; ▌Arthur F. Jones (Republican) 31.0%
New Jersey 10	Peter W. Rodino	Democratic	1948	Incumbent re-elected.	▌ ✓ Peter W. Rodino (Democratic) 95.9%; ▌Chris Brandlon (Socialist Workers) 4.1%
New Jersey 11	Dean Gallo	Republican	1984	Incumbent re-elected.	▌ ✓ Dean Gallo (Republican) 68.0%; ▌Frank Askin (Democratic) 32.0%
New Jersey 12	Jim Courter	Republican	1978	Incumbent re-elected.	▌ ✓ Jim Courter (Republican) 63.5%; ▌David Crabiel (Democratic) 36.5%
New Jersey 13	Jim Saxton	Republican	1984	Incumbent re-elected.	▌ ✓ Jim Saxton (Republican) 65.4%; ▌John Wydra (Democratic) 34.6%
New Jersey 14	Frank J. Guarini	Democratic	1978	Incumbent re-elected.	▌ ✓ Frank J. Guarini (Democratic) 70.7%; ▌Albio Sires (Republican) 26.7%; ▌Herbert H. Shaw (Independent) 2.0%; ▌William Link (Independent) 0.6%

== New Mexico ==
District	Incumbent	Party	First elected	Result	Candidates
New Mexico 1	Manuel Lujan Jr.	Republican	1968	Incumbent re-elected.	▌ ✓ Manuel Lujan Jr. (Republican) 70.9%; ▌Manny Garcia (Democratic) 29.1%
New Mexico 2	Joe Skeen	Republican	1980	Incumbent re-elected.	▌ ✓ Joe Skeen (Republican) 62.9%; ▌Mike Runnels (Democratic) 37.1%
New Mexico 3	Bill Richardson	Democratic	1982	Incumbent re-elected.	▌ ✓ Bill Richardson (Democratic) 71.3%; ▌David Cargo (Republican) 28.7%

== New York ==
District	Incumbent	Party	First elected	Result	Candidates
New York 1	William Carney	Republican	1978 (Note: Carney was elected as a Conservative who was nominated by the New York Republican Party and switched to the latter in October 1985.)	Incumbent retired. Democratic gain.	▌ ✓ George J. Hochbrueckner (Democratic) 51.2%; ▌Gregory J. Blass (Republican) 42.3%; ▌Dominic J. Santoro (Conservative) 3.3%; ▌William J. Doyle (Right to Life) 3.2%
New York 2	Thomas J. Downey	Democratic	1974	Incumbent re-elected.	▌ ✓ Thomas J. Downey (Democratic) 64.3%; ▌Jeffrey A. Butzke (Republican) 32.4%; ▌Veronica Windishman (Right to Life) 3.4%
New York 3	Robert J. Mrazek	Democratic	1982	Incumbent re-elected.	▌ ✓ Robert J. Mrazek (Democratic) 56.4%; ▌Joseph A. Guarino (Republican) 40.6%; ▌Charles W. Welch (Right to Life) 3.0%
New York 4	Norman F. Lent	Republican	1970	Incumbent re-elected.	▌ ✓ Norman F. Lent (Republican) 64.8%; ▌Patricia Sullivan (Democratic) 30.6%; ▌George E. Patterson (Right to Life) 4.6%
New York 5	Raymond J. McGrath	Republican	1980	Incumbent re-elected.	▌ ✓ Raymond J. McGrath (Republican) 65.3%; ▌Michael T. Sullivan (Democratic) 34.7%
New York 6	Alton Waldon	Democratic	1986	Incumbent lost renomination. Democratic hold.	▌ ✓ Floyd Flake (Democratic) 67.7%; ▌Bo Dietl (Republican) 32.3%
New York 7	Gary Ackerman	Democratic	1983 (special)	Incumbent re-elected.	▌ ✓ Gary Ackerman (Democratic) 77.4%; ▌Edward Nelson Rodriguez (Republican) 22.6%
New York 8	James H. Scheuer	Democratic	1964; 1972 (defeated); 1974	Incumbent re-elected.	▌ ✓ James H. Scheuer (Democratic) 90.2%; ▌Gustave A. Reifenkugel (Conservative) 9.8%
New York 9	Thomas J. Manton	Democratic	1984	Incumbent re-elected.	▌ ✓ Thomas J. Manton (Democratic) 69.4%; ▌Salvatore J. Calise (Republican) 24.7%; ▌Thomas V. Ognibene (Conservative) 5.9%
New York 10	Chuck Schumer	Democratic	1980	Incumbent re-elected.	▌ ✓ Chuck Schumer (Democratic) 93.3%; ▌Alice Gaffney (Conservative) 6.7%
New York 11	Edolphus Towns	Democratic	1982	Incumbent re-elected.	▌ ✓ Edolphus Towns (Democratic) 89.4%; ▌Nathaniel Hendricks (Republican) 8.7%; ▌Alfred Hamel (Conservative) 1.9%
New York 12	Major Owens	Democratic	1982	Incumbent re-elected.	▌ ✓ Major Owens (Democratic) 91.5%; ▌Owen Augustin (Republican) 6.0%; ▌Joseph N. O. Caesar (Conservative) 2.5%
New York 13	Stephen Solarz	Democratic	1974	Incumbent re-elected.	▌ ✓ Stephen Solarz (Democratic) 82.4%; ▌Leon F. Nadrowski (Republican) 14.8%; ▌Samuel Roth (Conservative) 2.8%
New York 14	Guy Molinari	Republican	1980	Incumbent re-elected.	▌ ✓ Guy Molinari (Republican) 68.8%; ▌Barbara Walla (Democratic) 29.7%; ▌Joseph F. Sulley (Liberal) 1.5%
New York 15	Bill Green	Republican	1978	Incumbent re-elected.	▌ ✓ Bill Green (Republican) 58.0%; ▌George A. Hirsch (Democratic) 42.0%
New York 16	Charles Rangel	Democratic	1970	Incumbent re-elected.	▌ ✓ Charles Rangel (Democratic) 96.4%; ▌Michael T. Berns (Conservative) 2.0%; ▌William Seraile (New Alliance) 1.6%
New York 17	Ted Weiss	Democratic	1976	Incumbent re-elected.	▌ ✓ Ted Weiss (Democratic) 85.5%; ▌Thomas A. Chorba (Republican) 14.0%; ▌James J. Mangia (New Alliance) 0.5%
New York 18	Robert García	Democratic	1978	Incumbent re-elected.	▌ ✓ Robert García (Democratic) 93.5%; ▌Melanie Chase (Republican) 5.3%; ▌Lorraine Verhoff (Conservative) 1.1%
New York 19	Mario Biaggi	Democratic	1968	Incumbent re-elected.	▌ ✓ Mario Biaggi (Democratic) 90.2%; ▌Alice Farrell (Conservative) 7.1%; ▌John J. Barry (Right to Life) 2.7%
New York 20	Joe DioGuardi	Republican	1984	Incumbent re-elected.	▌ ✓ Joe DioGuardi (Republican) 53.9%; ▌Bella Abzug (Democratic) 44.6%; ▌Florence T. O'Grady (Right to Life) 1.6%
New York 21	Hamilton Fish IV	Republican	1968	Incumbent re-elected.	▌ ✓ Hamilton Fish IV (Republican) 76.5%; ▌Lawrence W. Grunberger (Democratic) 21.2%; ▌Karen A. Gormley-Vitale (Right to Life) 2.2%
New York 22	Benjamin A. Gilman	Republican	1972	Incumbent re-elected.	▌ ✓ Benjamin Gilman (Republican) 69.5%; ▌Eleanor F. Burlingham (Democratic) 27.2%; ▌Richard Bruno (Right to Life) 3.4%
New York 23	Samuel S. Stratton	Democratic	1958	Incumbent re-elected.	▌ ✓ Samuel S. Stratton (Democratic) 96.4%; ▌James Joseph Callahan (Socialist Workers) 3.6%
New York 24	Gerald Solomon	Republican	1978	Incumbent re-elected.	▌ ✓ Gerald Solomon (Republican) 70.4%; ▌Edward James Bloch (Democratic) 29.6%
New York 25	Sherwood Boehlert	Republican	1982	Incumbent re-elected.	▌ ✓ Sherwood Boehlert (Republican) 69.0%; ▌Kevin J. Conway (Democratic) 22.4%; ▌Robert S. Barstow (Conservative) 8.6%
New York 26	David O'Brien Martin	Republican	1980	Incumbent re-elected.	▌ ✓ David O'Brien Martin (Republican) Uncontested
New York 27	George C. Wortley	Republican	1980	Incumbent re-elected.	▌ ✓ George C. Wortley (Republican) 49.7%; ▌Rosemary S. Pooler (Democratic) 49.1%; ▌Dennis R. Burns (Right to Life) 1.3%
New York 28	Matthew F. McHugh	Democratic	1974	Incumbent re-elected.	▌ ✓ Matthew F. McHugh (Democratic) 68.3%; ▌Mark R. Masterson (Republican) 31.7%
New York 29	Frank Horton	Republican	1962	Incumbent re-elected.	▌ ✓ Frank Horton (Republican) 70.7%; ▌James R. Vogel (Democratic) 24.2%; ▌Robert C. Byrnes Jr. (Conservative) 3.4%; ▌Donald M. Peters (Right to Life) 1.7%
New York 30	Fred J. Eckert	Republican	1984	Incumbent lost re-election. Democratic gain.	▌ ✓ Louise Slaughter (Democratic) 51.0%; ▌Fred J. Eckert (Republican) 49.0%
New York 31	Jack Kemp	Republican	1970	Incumbent re-elected.	▌ ✓ Jack Kemp (Republican) 57.5%; ▌James P. Keane (Democratic) 42.0%; ▌Gerald R. Morgan (Liberal) 0.6%
New York 32	John LaFalce	Democratic	1974	Incumbent re-elected.	▌ ✓ John LaFalce (Democratic) 91.0%; ▌Dean L. Walker (Conservative) 5.7%; ▌Anthony J. Murty (Right to Life) 3.4%
New York 33	Henry J. Nowak	Democratic	1974	Incumbent re-elected.	▌ ✓ Henry J. Nowak (Democratic) 85.1%; ▌Charles A. Walker (Republican) 14.9%
New York 34	Stan Lundine	Democratic	1976	Incumbent retired to run for Lieutenant Governor of New York. Republican gain.	▌ ✓ Amo Houghton (Republican) 60.1%; ▌Larry M. Himelein (Democratic) 39.9%

== North Carolina ==
District	Incumbent	Party	First elected	Result	Candidates
North Carolina 1	Walter B. Jones Sr.	Democratic	1966	Incumbent re-elected.	▌ ✓ Walter B. Jones Sr. (Democratic) 69.5%; ▌Howard Moye (Republican) 30.5%
North Carolina 2	Tim Valentine	Democratic	1982	Incumbent re-elected.	▌ ✓ Tim Valentine (Democratic) 74.6%; ▌Bud McElhaney (Republican) 25.4%
North Carolina 3	Charles Orville Whitley	Democratic	1976	Incumbent retired. Democratic hold.	▌ ✓ Martin Lancaster (Democratic) 64.5%; ▌Gerald B. Hurst (Republican) 35.5%
North Carolina 4	Bill Cobey	Republican	1984	Incumbent lost re-election. Democratic gain.	▌ ✓ David Price (Democratic) 55.7%; ▌Bill Cobey (Republican) 44.3%
North Carolina 5	Stephen L. Neal	Democratic	1974	Incumbent re-elected.	▌ ✓ Stephen L. Neal (Democratic) 54.1%; ▌Stuart Epperson (Republican) 45.9%
North Carolina 6	Howard Coble	Republican	1984	Incumbent re-elected.	▌ ✓ Howard Coble (Republican) 50.03%; ▌Charles Robin Britt (Democratic) 49.97%
North Carolina 7	Charlie Rose	Democratic	1972	Incumbent re-elected.	▌ ✓ Charlie Rose (Democratic) 64.2%; ▌Thomas J. Harrelson (Republican) 35.8%
North Carolina 8	Bill Hefner	Democratic	1974	Incumbent re-elected.	▌ ✓ Bill Hefner (Democratic) 57.9%; ▌William G. Hamby Jr. (Republican) 42.1%
North Carolina 9	Alex McMillan	Republican	1984	Incumbent re-elected.	▌ ✓ Alex McMillan (Republican) 51.3%; ▌D. G. Martin (Democratic) 48.7%
North Carolina 10	Jim Broyhill	Republican	1962	Incumbent resigned when appointed U.S. Senator. Republican hold.	▌ ✓ Cass Ballenger (Republican) 57.5%; ▌Lester D. Roark (Democratic) 42.5%
North Carolina 11	Bill Hendon	Republican	1980; 1982 (defeated); 1984	Incumbent lost re-election. Democratic gain.	▌ ✓ James M. Clarke (Democratic) 50.7%; ▌Bill Hendon (Republican) 49.3%

== North Dakota ==
District	Incumbent	Party	First elected	Result	Candidates
North Dakota at-large	Byron Dorgan	Democratic-NPL	1980	Incumbent re-elected.	▌ ✓ Byron Dorgan (Democratic-NPL) 75.5%; ▌Syver Vinje (Republican) 23.4%; ▌Gerald W. Kopp (Independent) 1.1%

== Ohio ==
District	Incumbent	Party	First elected	Result	Candidates
Ohio 1	Tom Luken	Democratic	1974 (special); 1974 (lost); 1976	Incumbent re-elected.	▌ ✓ Tom Luken (Democratic) 61.7%; ▌Fred E. Morr (Republican) 38.3%
Ohio 2	Bill Gradison	Republican	1974	Incumbent re-elected.	▌ ✓ Bill Gradison (Republican) 70.7%; ▌William F. Stineman (Democratic) 29.3%
Ohio 3	Tony P. Hall	Democratic	1978	Incumbent re-elected.	▌ ✓ Tony P. Hall (Democratic) 73.7%; ▌Ron Crutcher (Republican) 26.3%
Ohio 4	Mike Oxley	Republican	1972	Incumbent re-elected.	▌ ✓ Mike Oxley (Republican) 75.1%; ▌Clem T. Cratty (Democratic) 17.1%; ▌Raven L. Workman (Independent) 7.8%
Ohio 5	Del Latta	Republican	1958	Incumbent re-elected.	▌ ✓ Del Latta (Republican) 65.0%; ▌Tom Murray (Democratic) 35.0%
Ohio 6	Bob McEwen	Republican	1980	Incumbent re-elected.	▌ ✓ Bob McEwen (Republican) 70.3%; ▌Gordon R. Roberts (Democratic) 27.9%; ▌Amos Seeley (Independent) 1.9%
Ohio 7	Mike DeWine	Republican	1982	Incumbent re-elected.	▌ ✓ Mike DeWine (Republican) Uncontested
Ohio 8	Tom Kindness	Republican	1974	Incumbent retired to run for U.S. Senator. Republican hold.	▌ ✓ Donald "Buz" Lukens (Republican) 68.1%; ▌John W. Griffin (Democratic) 31.9%
Ohio 9	Marcy Kaptur	Democratic	1982	Incumbent re-elected.	▌ ✓ Marcy Kaptur (Democratic) 77.5%; ▌Mike Shufeldt (Republican) 22.5%
Ohio 10	Clarence E. Miller	Republican	1966	Incumbent re-elected.	▌ ✓ Clarence E. Miller (Republican) 70.4%; ▌John M. Buchanan (Democratic) 29.6%
Ohio 11	Dennis E. Eckart	Democratic	1980	Incumbent re-elected.	▌ ✓ Dennis E. Eckart (Democratic) 72.5%; ▌Margaret R. Mueller (Republican) 24.9%; ▌Werner J. Lange (Independent) 2.7%
Ohio 12	John Kasich	Republican	1982	Incumbent re-elected.	▌ ✓ John Kasich (Republican) 73.4%; ▌Timothy C. Jochim (Democratic) 26.6%
Ohio 13	Don Pease	Democratic	1976	Incumbent re-elected.	▌ ✓ Don Pease (Democratic) 62.8%; ▌William D. Nielsen Jr. (Republican) 37.2%
Ohio 14	John F. Seiberling	Democratic	1970	Incumbent retired. Democratic hold.	▌ ✓ Tom Sawyer (Democratic) 53.7%; ▌Lynn Slaby (Republican) 46.3%
Ohio 15	Chalmers Wylie	Republican	1966	Incumbent re-elected.	▌ ✓ Chalmers Wylie (Republican) 63.7%; ▌David L. Jackson (Democratic) 36.3%
Ohio 16	Ralph Regula	Republican	1972	Incumbent re-elected.	▌ ✓ Ralph Regula (Republican) 76.3%; ▌William J. Kennick (Democratic) 23.7%
Ohio 17	James Traficant	Democratic	1984	Incumbent re-elected.	▌ ✓ James Traficant (Democratic) 72.3%; ▌James H. Fulks (Republican) 27.7%
Ohio 18	Douglas Applegate	Democratic	1976	Incumbent re-elected.	▌ ✓ Douglas Applegate (Democratic) Uncontested
Ohio 19	Ed Feighan	Democratic	1982	Incumbent re-elected.	▌ ✓ Ed Feighan (Democratic) 54.8%; ▌Gary C. Suhadolnik (Republican) 45.2%
Ohio 20	Mary Rose Oakar	Democratic	1976	Incumbent re-elected.	▌ ✓ Mary Rose Oakar (Democratic) 84.9%; ▌Bill Smith (Republican) 15.1%
Ohio 21	Louis Stokes	Democratic	1968	Incumbent re-elected.	▌ ✓ Louis Stokes (Democratic) 81.6%; ▌Franklin H. Roski (Republican) 18.4%

== Oklahoma ==
District	Incumbent	Party	First elected	Result	Candidates
Oklahoma 1	James R. Jones	Democratic	1972	Incumbent retired to run for U.S. Senator. Republican gain.	▌ ✓ Jim Inhofe (Republican) 54.8%; ▌Gary D. Allison (Democratic) 42.8%; ▌Carl E. McCullough Jr. (Independent) 2.4%
Oklahoma 2	Mike Synar	Democratic	1978	Incumbent re-elected.	▌ ✓ Mike Synar (Democratic) 73.3%; ▌Gary K. Rice (Republican) 26.7%
Oklahoma 3	Wes Watkins	Democratic	1976	Incumbent re-elected.	▌ ✓ Wes Watkins (Democratic) 78.1%; ▌Patrick K. Miller (Republican) 21.9%
Oklahoma 4	Dave McCurdy	Democratic	1980	Incumbent re-elected.	▌ ✓ Dave McCurdy (Democratic) 76.2%; ▌Larry Humphreys (Republican) 23.8%
Oklahoma 5	Mickey Edwards	Republican	1976	Incumbent re-elected.	▌ ✓ Mickey Edwards (Republican) 70.6%; ▌Donna Compton (Democratic) 29.4%
Oklahoma 6	Glenn English	Democratic	1974	Incumbent re-elected.	▌ ✓ Glenn English (Democratic) Uncontested

== Oregon ==
District	Incumbent	Party	First elected	Result	Candidates
Oregon 1	Les AuCoin	Democratic	1974	Incumbent re-elected.	▌ ✓ Les AuCoin (Democratic) 61.7%; ▌Anthony Meeker (Republican) 38.3%
Oregon 2	Bob Smith	Republican	1982	Incumbent re-elected.	▌ ✓ Bob Smith (Republican) 60.2%; ▌Larry Tuttle (Democratic) 39.8%
Oregon 3	Ron Wyden	Democratic	1980	Incumbent re-elected.	▌ ✓ Ron Wyden (Democratic) 86.0%; ▌Thomas H. Phelan (Republican) 14.0%
Oregon 4	Jim Weaver	Democratic	1974	Incumbent retired to run for U.S. Senator. Democratic hold.	▌ ✓ Peter DeFazio (Democratic) 54.1%; ▌Bruce Long (Republican) 45.9%
Oregon 5	Denny Smith	Republican	1980	Incumbent re-elected.	▌ ✓ Denny Smith (Republican) 60.5%; ▌Barbara Ross (Democratic) 39.5%

== Pennsylvania ==
District	Incumbent	Party	First elected	Result	Candidates
Pennsylvania 1	Thomas M. Foglietta	Democratic	1980	Incumbent re-elected.	▌ ✓ Thomas M. Foglietta (Democratic) 74.7%; ▌Anthony J. Mucciolo (Republican) 25.3%
Pennsylvania 2	William H. Gray III	Democratic	1978	Incumbent re-elected.	▌ ✓ William H. Gray III (Democratic) 98.4%; ▌Linda R. Ragin (New Alliance) 1.6%
Pennsylvania 3	Robert Borski	Democratic	1982	Incumbent re-elected.	▌ ✓ Robert A. Borski Jr. (Democratic) 61.8%; ▌Robert A. Rovner (Republican) 38.2%
Pennsylvania 4	Joseph P. Kolter	Democratic	1982	Incumbent re-elected.	▌ ✓ Joseph P. Kolter (Democratic) 60.4%; ▌Al Lindsay (Republican) 38.7%; ▌Emily C. Fair (Populist) 0.9%
Pennsylvania 5	Dick Schulze	Republican	1974	Incumbent re-elected.	▌ ✓ Dick Schulze (Republican) 65.7%; ▌Tim Ringgold (Democratic) 34.3%
Pennsylvania 6	Gus Yatron	Democratic	1968	Incumbent re-elected.	▌ ✓ Gus Yatron (Democratic) 69.1%; ▌Norm Bertasavage (Republican) 30.9%
Pennsylvania 7	Robert W. Edgar	Democratic	1974	Incumbent retired to run for U.S. Senator. Republican gain.	▌ ✓ Curt Weldon (Republican) 61.3%; ▌Bill Spingler (Democratic) 38.7%
Pennsylvania 8	Peter H. Kostmayer	Democratic	1976; 1980 (defeated); 1982	Incumbent re-elected.	▌ ✓ Peter H. Kostmayer (Democratic) 55.0%; ▌David A. Christian (Republican) 45.0%
Pennsylvania 9	Bud Shuster	Republican	1972	Incumbent re-elected.	▌ ✓ Bud Shuster (Republican) Uncontested
Pennsylvania 10	Joseph M. McDade	Republican	1962	Incumbent re-elected.	▌ ✓ Joseph M. McDade (Republican) 74.7%; ▌Robert C. Bolus (Democratic) 25.3%
Pennsylvania 11	Paul Kanjorski	Democratic	1984	Incumbent re-elected.	▌ ✓ Paul Kanjorski (Democratic) 70.6%; ▌Marc Holtzman (Republican) 29.4%
Pennsylvania 12	John Murtha	Democratic	1974	Incumbent re-elected.	▌ ✓ John Murtha (Democratic) 67.4%; ▌Kathy Holtzman (Republican) 32.6%
Pennsylvania 13	Lawrence Coughlin	Republican	1968	Incumbent re-elected.	▌ ✓ Lawrence Coughlin (Republican) 58.5%; ▌Joe Hoeffel (Democratic) 41.5%
Pennsylvania 14	William J. Coyne	Democratic	1980	Incumbent re-elected.	▌ ✓ William J. Coyne (Democratic) 89.6%; ▌Richard Edward Caligiuri (Libertarian) 5.2%; ▌Mark Weddleton (Socialist Workers) 2.7%; ▌Thomas R. McIntyre (Populist) 1.3%; ▌Phyllis Gray (Workers League) 1.3%
Pennsylvania 15	Donald L. Ritter	Republican	1978	Incumbent re-elected.	▌ ✓ Donald L. Ritter (Republican) 56.8%; ▌Joe Simonetta (Democratic) 43.2%
Pennsylvania 16	Bob Walker	Republican	1976	Incumbent re-elected.	▌ ✓ Bob Walker (Republican) 74.6%; ▌James Hagelgans (Democratic) 25.4%
Pennsylvania 17	George Gekas	Republican	1982	Incumbent re-elected.	▌ ✓ George Gekas (Republican) 73.6%; ▌Michael S. Ogden (Democratic) 26.4%
Pennsylvania 18	Doug Walgren	Democratic	1976	Incumbent re-elected.	▌ ✓ Doug Walgren (Democratic) 63.0%; ▌Ernie Buckman (Republican) 37.0%
Pennsylvania 19	Bill Goodling	Republican	1974	Incumbent re-elected.	▌ ✓ Bill Goodling (Republican) 72.9%; ▌Richard F. Thornton (Democratic) 27.1%
Pennsylvania 20	Joseph M. Gaydos	Democratic	1968	Incumbent re-elected.	▌ ✓ Joseph M. Gaydos (Democratic) 98.5%; ▌Alden W. Vedder (Workers League) 1.5%
Pennsylvania 21	Tom Ridge	Republican	1982	Incumbent re-elected.	▌ ✓ Tom Ridge (Republican) 80.9%; ▌Joylyn Blackwell (Democratic) 19.1%
Pennsylvania 22	Austin Murphy	Democratic	1976	Incumbent re-elected.	▌ ✓ Austin Murphy (Democratic) Uncontested
Pennsylvania 23	William Clinger	Republican	1978	Incumbent re-elected.	▌ ✓ William Clinger (Republican) 55.5%; ▌Bill Wachob (Democratic) 44.5%

== Rhode Island ==
District	Incumbent	Party	First elected	Result	Candidates
Rhode Island 1	Fernand St Germain	Democratic	1960	Incumbent re-elected.	▌ ✓ Fernand St Germain (Democratic) 68.5%; ▌John A. Holmes Jr. (Republican) 31.5%
Rhode Island 2	Claudine Schneider	Republican	1980	Incumbent re-elected.	▌ ✓ Claudine Schneider (Republican) 67.6%; ▌Donald J. Ferry (Democratic) 32.4%

== South Carolina ==
District	Incumbent	Party	First elected	Result	Candidates
South Carolina 1	Thomas F. Hartnett	Republican	1980	Incumbent retired to run for Lieutenant Governor of South Carolina. Republican hold.	▌ ✓ Arthur Ravenel Jr. (Republican) 52.0%; ▌Jimmy Stuckey (Democratic) 48.0%
South Carolina 2	Floyd Spence	Republican	1970	Incumbent re-elected.	▌ ✓ Floyd Spence (Republican) 53.6%; ▌Fred Zeigler (Democratic) 46.4%
South Carolina 3	Butler Derrick	Democratic	1974	Incumbent re-elected.	▌ ✓ Butler Derrick (Democratic) 68.4%; ▌Richard Dickison (Republican) 31.6%
South Carolina 4	Carroll A. Campbell Jr.	Republican	1978	Incumbent retired to run for Governor of South Carolina. Democratic gain.	▌ ✓ Liz J. Patterson (Democratic) 51.4%; ▌Bill Workman (Republican) 47.3%; ▌Bob Wilson (American) 1.3%
South Carolina 5	John Spratt	Democratic	1982	Incumbent re-elected.	▌ ✓ John Spratt (Democratic) Uncontested
South Carolina 6	Robin Tallon	Democratic	1982	Incumbent re-elected.	▌ ✓ Robin Tallon (Democratic) 75.5%; ▌Robbie Cunningham (Republican) 24.5%

== South Dakota ==
District	Incumbent	Party	First elected	Result	Candidates
South Dakota at-large	Tom Daschle	Democratic	1978	Incumbent retired to run for U.S. Senator. Democratic hold.	▌ ✓ Tim Johnson (Democratic) 59.2%; ▌Dale Bell (Republican) 40.8%

== Tennessee ==
District	Incumbent	Party	First elected	Result	Candidates
Tennessee 1	Jimmy Quillen	Republican	1962	Incumbent re-elected.	▌ ✓ Jimmy Quillen (Republican) 68.9%; ▌John B. Russell (Democratic) 31.1%
Tennessee 2	John Duncan Sr.	Republican	1964	Incumbent re-elected.	▌ ✓ John Duncan Sr. (Republican) 76.2%; ▌John F. Bowen (Democratic) 23.8%
Tennessee 3	Marilyn Lloyd	Democratic	1974	Incumbent re-elected.	▌ ✓ Marilyn Lloyd (Democratic) 53.9%; ▌Jim Golden (Republican) 46.1%
Tennessee 4	Jim Cooper	Democratic	1982	Incumbent re-elected.	▌ ✓ Jim Cooper (Democratic) 100%
Tennessee 5	Bill Boner	Democratic	1978	Incumbent re-elected.	▌ ✓ Bill Boner (Democratic) 57.9%; ▌Terry Holcomb (Republican) 39.9%; ▌Charlie Daniels (Independent) 1.4%; Others: ▌Russell Hancock (Independent) 0.4%; ▌Kenneth W. Bloodworth (Independent) 0.4%
Tennessee 6	Bart Gordon	Democratic	1984	Incumbent re-elected.	▌ ✓ Bart Gordon (Democratic) 76.8%; ▌Fred Vail (Republican) 23.2%
Tennessee 7	Don Sundquist	Republican	1982	Incumbent re-elected.	▌ ✓ Don Sundquist (Republican) 72.3%; ▌M. Lloyd Hiler (Democratic) 27.7%
Tennessee 8	Ed Jones	Democratic	1969 (special)	Incumbent re-elected.	▌ ✓ Ed Jones (Democratic) 80.4%; ▌Dan H. Campbell (Republican) 19.6%
Tennessee 9	Harold Ford Sr.	Democratic	1974	Incumbent re-elected.	▌ ✓ Harold Ford Sr. (Democratic) 83.7%; ▌Isaac Richmond (Independent) 16.3%

== Texas ==
District	Incumbent	Party	First elected	Result	Candidates
Texas 1	Jim Chapman	Democratic	1985 (special)	Incumbent re-elected.	▌ ✓ Jim Chapman (Democratic) Uncontested
Texas 2	Charles Wilson	Democratic	1972	Incumbent re-elected.	▌ ✓ Charles Wilson (Democratic) 56.8%; ▌Julian Gordon (Republican) 40.5%; ▌Sam I. Paradice (Independent) 2.8%
Texas 3	Steve Bartlett	Republican	1982	Incumbent re-elected.	▌ ✓ Steve Bartlett (Republican) 94.1%; ▌Brent Barnes (Independent) 4.1%; ▌Don Gough (Libertarian) 1.8%
Texas 4	Ralph Hall	Democratic	1980	Incumbent re-elected.	▌ ✓ Ralph Hall (Democratic) 71.7%; ▌Thomas Blow (Republican) 28.3%
Texas 5	John Bryant	Democratic	1982	Incumbent re-elected.	▌ ✓ John Bryant (Democratic) 58.5%; ▌Tom Carter (Republican) 40.7%; ▌Bob Brewer (Libertarian) 0.8%
Texas 6	Joe Barton	Republican	1984	Incumbent re-elected.	▌ ✓ Joe Barton (Republican) 55.8%; ▌Pete Geren (Democratic) 44.2%
Texas 7	Bill Archer	Republican	1970	Incumbent re-elected.	▌ ✓ Bill Archer (Republican) 87.4%; ▌Harry Kniffen (Democratic) 11.9%; ▌Roger Plail (Libertarian) 0.7%
Texas 8	Jack Fields	Republican	1980	Incumbent re-elected.	▌ ✓ Jack Fields (Republican) 68.4%; ▌Blaine Mann (Democratic) 31.6%
Texas 9	Jack Brooks	Democratic	1952	Incumbent re-elected.	▌ ✓ Jack Brooks (Democratic) 61.5%; ▌Lisa D. Duperier (Republican) 38.5%
Texas 10	J. J. Pickle	Democratic	1963 (special)	Incumbent re-elected.	▌ ✓ J. J. Pickle (Democratic) 72.3%; ▌Carole Keeton Rylander (Republican) 27.7%
Texas 11	Marvin Leath	Democratic	1978	Incumbent re-elected.	▌ ✓ Marvin Leath (Democratic) Uncontested
Texas 12	Jim Wright	Democratic	1954	Incumbent re-elected.	▌ ✓ Jim Wright (Democratic) 68.7%; ▌Don McNeil (Republican) 31.3%
Texas 13	Beau Boulter	Republican	1984	Incumbent re-elected.	▌ ✓ Beau Boulter (Republican) 64.9%; ▌Doug Seal (Democratic) 35.1%
Texas 14	Mac Sweeney	Republican	1984	Incumbent re-elected.	▌ ✓ Mac Sweeney (Republican) 52.3%; ▌Greg Laughlin (Democratic) 47.7%
Texas 15	Kika de la Garza	Democratic	1964	Incumbent re-elected.	▌ ✓ Kika de la Garza (Democratic) Uncontested
Texas 16	Ron Coleman	Democratic	1982	Incumbent re-elected.	▌ ✓ Ron Coleman (Democratic) 65.7%; ▌Roy Gillia (Republican) 34.3%
Texas 17	Charles Stenholm	Democratic	1978	Incumbent re-elected.	▌ ✓ Charles Stenholm (Democratic) Uncontested
Texas 18	Mickey Leland	Democratic	1978	Incumbent re-elected.	▌ ✓ Mickey Leland (Democratic) 90.2%; ▌Joanne Kuniansky (Independent) 9.8%
Texas 19	Larry Combest	Republican	1984	Incumbent re-elected.	▌ ✓ Larry Combest (Republican) 62.0%; ▌Gerald McCathern (Democratic) 38.0%
Texas 20	Henry B. González	Democratic	1961 (special)	Incumbent re-elected.	▌ ✓ Henry B. González (Democratic) Uncontested
Texas 21	Tom Loeffler	Republican	1978	Incumbent retired to run for Governor of Texas. Republican hold.	▌ ✓ Lamar S. Smith (Republican) 60.6%; ▌Pete Snelson (Democratic) 38.5%; ▌Jim Robinson (Libertarian) 0.9%
Texas 22	Tom DeLay	Republican	1984	Incumbent re-elected.	▌ ✓ Tom DeLay (Republican) 71.8%; ▌Susan Director (Democratic) 28.2%
Texas 23	Albert Bustamante	Democratic	1984	Incumbent re-elected.	▌ ✓ Albert Bustamante (Democratic) 90.7%; ▌Ken Hendrix (Libertarian) 9.3%
Texas 24	Martin Frost	Democratic	1978	Incumbent re-elected.	▌ ✓ Martin Frost (Democratic) 67.2%; ▌Bob Burk (Republican) 32.8%
Texas 25	Mike Andrews	Democratic	1982	Incumbent re-elected.	▌ ✓ Mike Andrews (Democratic) Uncontested
Texas 26	Dick Armey	Republican	1984	Incumbent re-elected.	▌ ✓ Dick Armey (Republican) 68.1%; ▌George Richardson (Democratic) 31.9%
Texas 27	Solomon Ortiz	Democratic	1982	Incumbent re-elected.	▌ ✓ Solomon Ortiz (Democratic) Uncontested

== Utah ==
District	Incumbent	Party	First elected	Result	Candidates
Utah 1	Jim Hansen	Republican	1980	Incumbent re-elected.	▌ ✓ Jim Hansen (Republican) 51.6%; ▌K. Gunn McKay (Democratic) 48.4%
Utah 2	David Smith Monson	Republican	1984	Incumbent retired. Democratic gain.	▌ ✓ Wayne Owens (Democratic) 55.2%; ▌M. Tom Shimizu (Republican) 43.7%; Others: ▌Stephen Carmichael Carr (Libertarian) 0.9%; ▌Scott Alan Breen (Socialist Workers) 0.1%
Utah 3	Howard C. Nielson	Republican	1982	Incumbent re-elected.	▌ ✓ Howard C. Nielson (Republican) 66.6%; ▌Dale F. Gardiner (Democratic) 32.7%; ▌David P. Hurst (Socialist Workers) 0.7%

== Vermont ==
District	Incumbent	Party	First elected	Result	Candidates
Vermont at-large	Jim Jeffords	Republican	1974	Incumbent re-elected.	▌ ✓ Jim Jeffords (Republican) 89.2%; ▌John T. McNulty (Pro-Life) 3.9%; ▌Peter Diamondstone (Liberty Union) 3.7%; ▌Morris Earle (Independent) 3.1%

== Virginia ==
District	Incumbent	Party	First elected	Result	Candidates
Virginia 1	Herb Bateman	Republican	1982	Incumbent re-elected.	▌ ✓ Herb Bateman (Republican) 56.0%; ▌Bobby Scott (Democratic) 44.0%
Virginia 2	G. William Whitehurst	Republican	1968	Incumbent retired. Democratic gain.	▌ ✓ Owen B. Pickett (Democratic) 49.5%; ▌A. Joe Canada Jr. (Republican) 41.9%; ▌Stephen P. Shao (Independent) 8.6%
Virginia 3	Thomas J. Bliley Jr.	Republican	1980	Incumbent re-elected.	▌ ✓ Thomas J. Bliley Jr. (Republican) 67.0%; ▌Kenneth E. Powell (Democratic) 29.7%; ▌J. Stephen Hodges (Independent) 3.3%
Virginia 4	Norman Sisisky	Democratic	1982	Incumbent re-elected.	▌ ✓ Norman Sisisky (Democratic) 99.8%
Virginia 5	Dan Daniel	Democratic	1968	Incumbent re-elected.	▌ ✓ Dan Daniel (Democratic) 81.5%; ▌Frank Cole (Independent) 18.5%
Virginia 6	Jim Olin	Democratic	1982	Incumbent re-elected.	▌ ✓ Jim Olin (Democratic) 69.9%; ▌Flo Neher Traywick (Republican) 30.1%
Virginia 7	D. French Slaughter Jr.	Republican	1984	Incumbent re-elected.	▌ ✓ D. French Slaughter Jr. (Republican) 98.3%
Virginia 8	Stanford Parris	Republican	1972; 1974 (lost); 1980	Incumbent re-elected.	▌ ✓ Stanford Parris (Republican) 61.8%; ▌James Boren (Democratic) 38.2%
Virginia 9	Rick Boucher	Democratic	1982	Incumbent re-elected.	▌ ✓ Rick Boucher (Democratic) 99.0%
Virginia 10	Frank Wolf	Republican	1980	Incumbent re-elected.	▌ ✓ Frank Wolf (Republican) 60.2%; ▌John G. Milliken (Democratic) 39.8%

== Washington ==
District	Incumbent	Party	First elected	Result	Candidates
Washington 1	John Miller	Republican	1984	Incumbent re-elected.	▌ ✓ John Miller (Republican) 51.4%; ▌Reese M. Lindquist (Democratic) 48.6%
Washington 2	Al Swift	Democratic	1978	Incumbent re-elected.	▌ ✓ Al Swift (Democratic) 72.2%; ▌Thomas S. Talman (Republican) 27.8%
Washington 3	Don Bonker	Democratic	1974	Incumbent re-elected.	▌ ✓ Don Bonker (Democratic) 73.6%; ▌Joseph R. Illing (Republican) 26.4%
Washington 4	Sid Morrison	Republican	1980	Incumbent re-elected.	▌ ✓ Sid Morrison (Republican) 72.1%; ▌Robert Goedecke (Democratic) 27.9%
Washington 5	Tom Foley	Democratic	1964	Incumbent re-elected.	▌ ✓ Tom Foley (Democratic) 74.7%; ▌Floyd Lee Wakefield (Republican) 25.3%
Washington 6	Norm Dicks	Democratic	1976	Incumbent re-elected.	▌ ✓ Norm Dicks (Democratic) 71.2%; ▌Kenneth W. Braaten (Republican) 28.8%
Washington 7	Mike Lowry	Democratic	1978	Incumbent re-elected.	▌ ✓ Mike Lowry (Democratic) 72.6%; ▌Don McDonald (Republican) 27.4%
Washington 8	Rod Chandler	Republican	1982	Incumbent re-elected.	▌ ✓ Rod Chandler (Republican) 65.2%; ▌David E. Giles (Democratic) 34.8%

== West Virginia ==
District	Incumbent	Party	First elected	Result	Candidates
West Virginia 1	Alan Mollohan	Democratic	1982	Incumbent re-elected.	▌ ✓ Alan Mollohan (Democratic) Uncontested
West Virginia 2	Harley O. Staggers Jr.	Democratic	1982	Incumbent re-elected.	▌ ✓ Harley O. Staggers Jr. (Democratic) 69.5%; ▌Michele Golden (Republican) 30.5%
West Virginia 3	Bob Wise	Democratic	1982	Incumbent re-elected.	▌ ✓ Bob Wise (Democratic) 64.9%; ▌Tim Sharp (Republican) 35.1%
West Virginia 4	Nick Rahall	Democratic	1976	Incumbent re-elected.	▌ ✓ Nick Rahall (Democratic) 71.3%; ▌Martin Miller Sr. (Republican) 28.7%

== Wisconsin ==
District	Incumbent			This race	
District	Member	Party	First elected	Results	Candidates
Wisconsin 1	Les Aspin	Democratic	1970	Incumbent re-elected.	▌ ✓ Les Aspin (Democratic) 74.3%; ▌Iris Peterson (Republican) 24.1%; ▌John Graf (Labor) 1.6%
Wisconsin 2	Robert Kastenmeier	Democratic	1958	Incumbent re-elected.	▌ ✓ Robert Kastenmeier (Democratic) 55.5%; ▌Ann J. Haney (Republican) 44.2%; ▌Syed Ameen (Independent) 0.2%
Wisconsin 3	Steve Gunderson	Republican	1980	Incumbent re-elected.	▌ ✓ Steve Gunderson (Republican) 64.1%; ▌Leland E. Mulder (Democratic) 35.9%
Wisconsin 4	Jerry Kleczka	Democratic	1984	Incumbent re-elected.	▌ ✓ Jerry Kleczka (Democratic) 99.6%
Wisconsin 5	Jim Moody	Democratic	1982	Incumbent re-elected.	▌ ✓ Jim Moody (Democratic) 99.0%
Wisconsin 6	Tom Petri	Republican	1979 (special)	Incumbent re-elected.	▌ ✓ Tom Petri (Republican) 96.7%; ▌John R. Daggett (Independent) 3.3%
Wisconsin 7	Dave Obey	Democratic	1969 (special)	Incumbent re-elected.	▌ ✓ Dave Obey (Democratic) 62.1%; ▌Kevin J. Hermening (Republican) 36.9%; ▌Joseph D. Damrell (Labor) 0.9%
Wisconsin 8	Toby Roth	Republican	1978	Incumbent re-elected.	▌ ✓ Toby Roth (Republican) 67.4%; ▌Paul Willems (Democratic) 32.6%
Wisconsin 9	Jim Sensenbrenner	Republican	1978	Incumbent re-elected.	▌ ✓ Jim Sensenbrenner (Republican) 78.2%; ▌Thomas G. Popp (Democratic) 21.8%

== Wyoming ==
District	Incumbent	Party	First elected	Result	Candidates
Wyoming at-large	Dick Cheney	Republican	1978	Incumbent re-elected.	▌ ✓ Dick Cheney (Republican) 69.5%; ▌Rick Gilmore (Democratic) 30.5%

== Non-voting delegates ==
District	Incumbent			This race	
District	Delegate	Party	First elected	Results	Candidates
American Samoa at-large	Fofō Iosefa Fiti Sunia	Democratic	1980	Incumbent re-elected.	▌ ✓ Fofō Iosefa Fiti Sunia (Democratic) 55.5%; ▌Soli Aumoeualogo (Republican) 44.5%
District of Columbia at-large	Walter Fauntroy	Democratic	1970	Incumbent re-elected.	▌ ✓ Walter Fauntroy (Democratic) 80.1%; ▌Mary L. H. King (Republican) 13.9%; ▌Julie McCall (Statehood) 4.8%
Guam at-large	Ben Blaz	Republican	1984	Incumbent re-elected.	▌ ✓ Ben Blaz (Republican) 63.9%; ▌Frank Torres (Democratic) 34.9%
U.S. Virgin Islands at-large	Ron de Lugo	Democratic	1972; 1978 (retired); 1980	Incumbent re-elected.	▌ ✓ Ron de Lugo (Democratic) 94.7%

== See also ==
- 1986 United States elections
  - 1986 United States gubernatorial elections
  - 1986 United States Senate elections
- 99th United States Congress
- 100th United States Congress

== Works cited ==
- Abramson, Paul; Aldrich, John; Rohde, David (1995). Change and Continuity in the 1992 Elections. CQ Press. ISBN 0871878399.
