= 1985 Louisiana's 8th congressional district special election =

- March 30, 1985
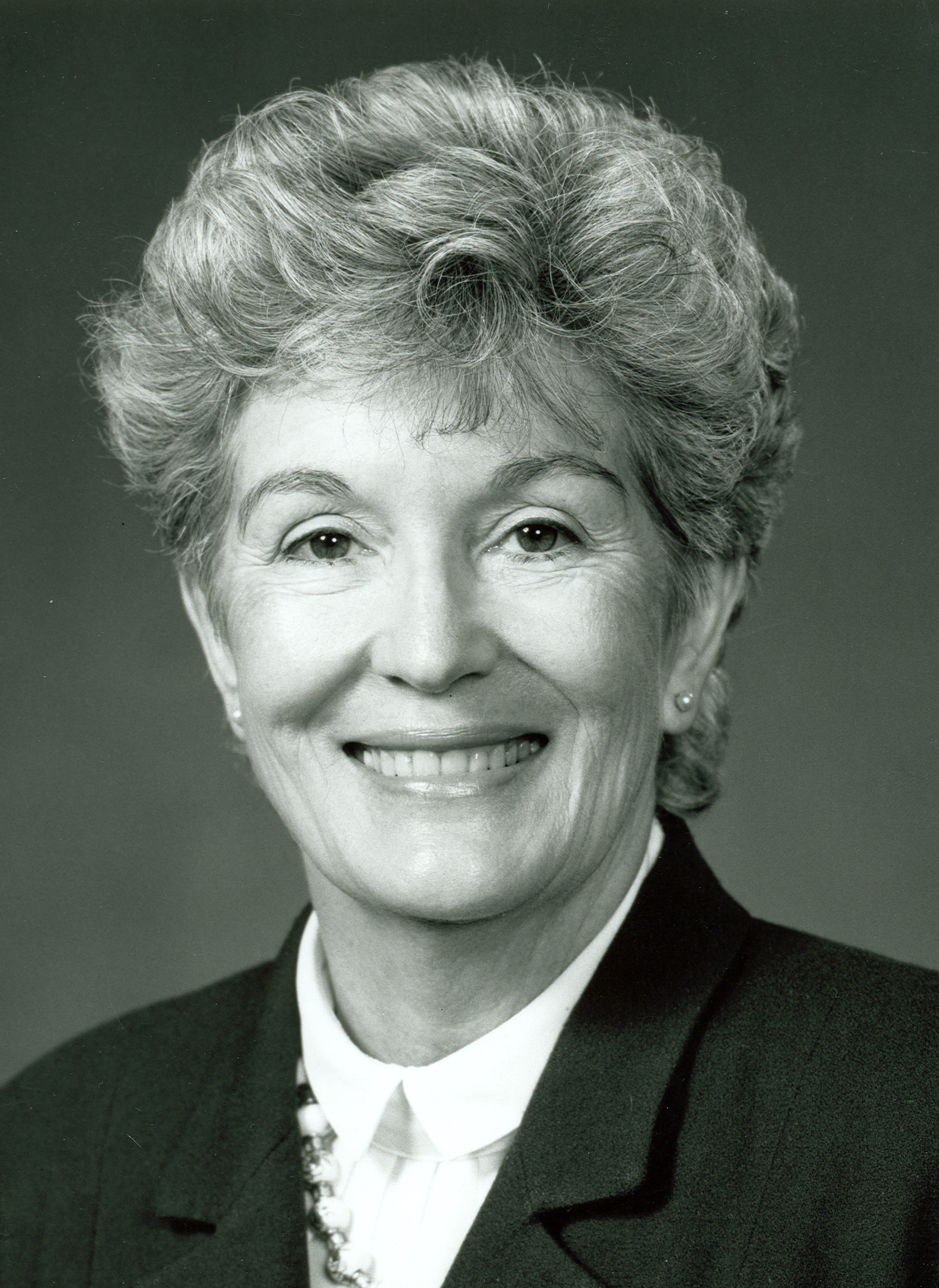

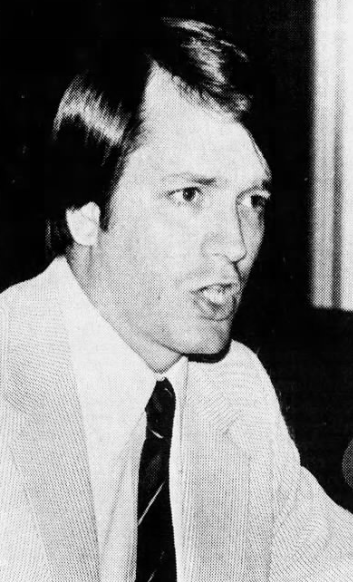

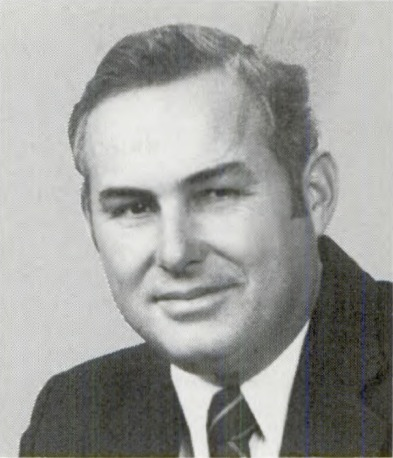
Candidate	Cathy Long	John W. "Jock" Scott	Clyde C. Holloway
Party	Democratic	Democratic	Republican
Popular vote	59,836	26,573	17,920
Percentage	55.38%	24.60%	16.59%
Representative before election
Gillis William Long
Democratic
Elected Representative
Catherine Small Long
Democratic

The 1985 United States House of Representatives special election in Louisiana's 8th congressional district was held on March 30, 1985, to select the successor to Congressman Gillis William Long, who died on January 20, 1985 after being re-elected in 1984. Long's widow, Cathy Long, ran to succeed him. Long won a majority of vote in the primary election, thereby eliminating the need for a runoff election.

== Candidates ==
- Cathy Long, widow of Congressman Gillis William Long (Democratic)
- John W. "Jock" Scott, State Representative (Democratic)
- Clyde C. Holloway, businessman (Republican)
- Daniel E. Becnel, Jr., attorney from LaPlace (Democratic)
- Frank J. McTopy (Democratic)

== Campaign ==
Following the Congressman's death, a crowded field of potential candidates emerged as possible successors, but few candidates ultimately proved willing to run against Cathy Long. Prior to Long's formal entry into the race, she urged "loyal" supporters of her husband to "not oppose her candidacy." After she announced, she was seen as the frontrunner, and most prospective candidates declined to run, with the exception of State Representative Jock Scott, who jumped into the race before Long. During the campaign, Long emphasized her familiarity with the issues and operating in Washington, D.C., noting, "I don't have to start from scratch. I already know the way Congress works and I can give an immediate return on the years the 8th District has invested in Gillis Long and his efficient office." She won the endorsement of the state's senior U.S. Senator, Russell B. Long, as well as the support of the local Black political establishment.

Scott, a conservative Democrat, was Long's leading opponent in the race. He emphasized his record in the state legislature, which earned him the endorsement of The Advocate, which praised him as someone who evaluates "each issue and decides it on its merits, an attitude which will serve his constituents, and Scott, well in Washington." Scott attacked Long's campaign as being overly reliant on voter sympathy and affiliation with her husband, characterizing her as absent from the campaign trail. "The longest address she's made is 30 seconds, and that was just to say thank you and to start milking the sympathy issue," he argued. He cast doubt on her ability to continue her husband's work. "Whoever is elected will be a rookie," he argued. "Gillis Long's seniority has been lost forever. His committee appointments have been taken and his offices have been taken."

Ultimately, despite concern that Long would fail to win a majority of the vote in the first round, she handily defeated her opponents, winning 55 percent of the vote, eliminating the need for a runoff election.

== Results ==
Louisiana's 8th congressional district special election
Party	Candidate	Votes	%
Democratic	Cathy Long	59,836	55.38%
Democratic	John W. "Jock" Scott	26,573	24.60%
Republican	Clyde C. Holloway	17,920	16.59%
Democratic	Daniel E. Becnel, Jr.	3,216	2.98%
Democratic	Frank J. McTopy	496	0.46%
Total votes		108,041	100.00%
Democratic hold			
