= Catherine Small Long =

American politician (1924–2019)

Cathy Long
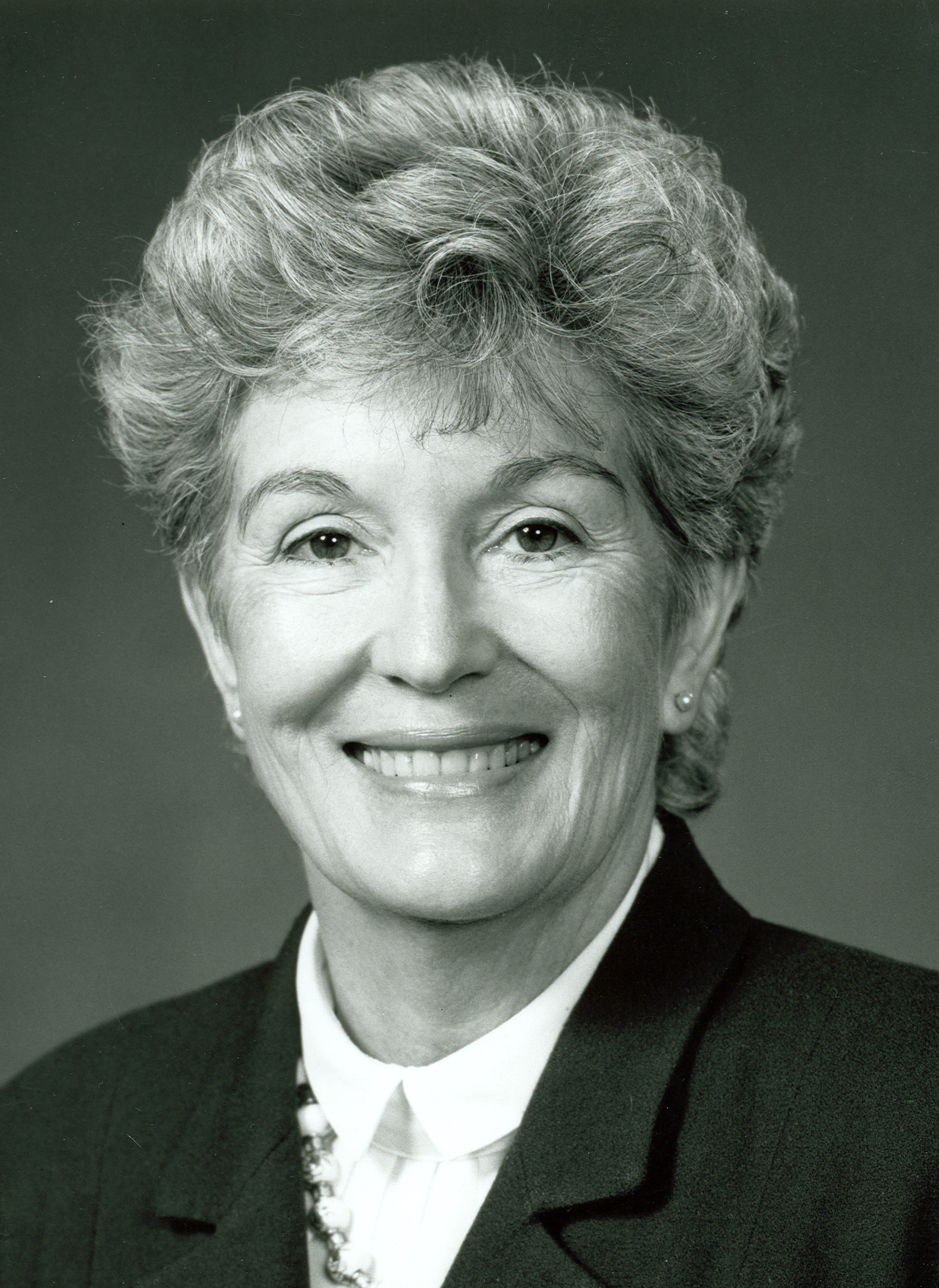

Member of the U.S. House of Representatives from Louisiana's 8th district
- In office March 30, 1985 – January 3, 1987 (Note: Long's official service begins on the date of the special election, while she was not sworn in until April 4, 1985.)
- Preceded by: Gillis William Long
- Succeeded by: Clyde C. Holloway

Personal details
- Born: Mary Catherine Small; February 7, 1924 Dayton, Ohio, U.S.
- Died: November 23, 2019 (aged 95) Chevy Chase, Maryland, U.S.
- Party: Democratic
- Spouse: Gillis William Long (m. 1947; died 1985)
- Children: 2
- Education: Louisiana State University (BA)

Military service
- Branch/service: United States Navy
- Rank: Pharmacist's Mate (2nd class)
- Battles/wars: World War II

Mary Catherine Small Long (born Mary Catherine Small; February 7, 1924 – November 23, 2019) was an American politician who served as the U.S. representative for Louisiana's 8th congressional district, which she filled from 1985 to 1987, the remainder of the term left by the death of her husband, Gillis William Long. Until it was disbanded in 1993, the 8th district was based in Central Louisiana about Alexandria. She was the first female military veteran elected to Congress, having served as a WAVE in the United States Navy.

== Early life and education ==
Mary Catherine Small was born in Dayton, Ohio, and attended school in Camp Hill, Pennsylvania. She served as a hospital corpsman in the United States Navy during World War II. Long earned a B.A. degree from Louisiana State University in 1948.

== Career ==
Long served in the U.S. Navy as a pharmacist's mate. Long became a staff assistant for Oregon senator Wayne Morse and Ohio Representative James G. Polk.

In January 1985, Long's husband died and left a vacancy in Louisiana 8th congressional district. In 1985, when Long announced her candidacy, some of the wives of other U.S. representatives came into the district to campaign on her behalf. Long won the special election, defeating candidates including Republican Clyde C. Holloway, a nurseryman from Forest Hill in southern Rapides Parish, and then State Representative Jock Scott of Alexandria, a Democrat who later switched parties. In 1986, Long declined to seek a full term as congresswoman.

In his autobiographical Peapatch Politics: The Earl Long Era in Louisiana Politics, former lieutenant governor and education superintendent William J. "Bill" Dodd, an astute observer of Louisiana politics for a half century, describes Cathy Long, who compiled a liberal voting record in Congress, as the "perfect political wife."

== Personal life ==
She married Gillis William Long in 1947. Long had two children, George Harrison Long (born October 13, 1954) and Janis Catherine Long (born March 25, 1957).

=== Death ===
Long died from complications of dementia at an assisted-living facility in Chevy Chase, Maryland on November 23, 2019, at age 95. Five years after her death and on her 100th birthday, Long's ashes were interred with her husband in a ceremony at the Alexandria National Cemetery.

== See also ==
- Women in the United States House of Representatives
- Speedy Long

U.S. House of Representatives
Preceded by Gillis William Long	Member of the U.S. House of Representatives from Louisiana's 8th congressional district 1985–1987	Succeeded by Clyde C. Holloway
