= 1986 United States Senate election in Louisiana =

- September 27, 1986 (general election); November 4, 1986 (runoff)
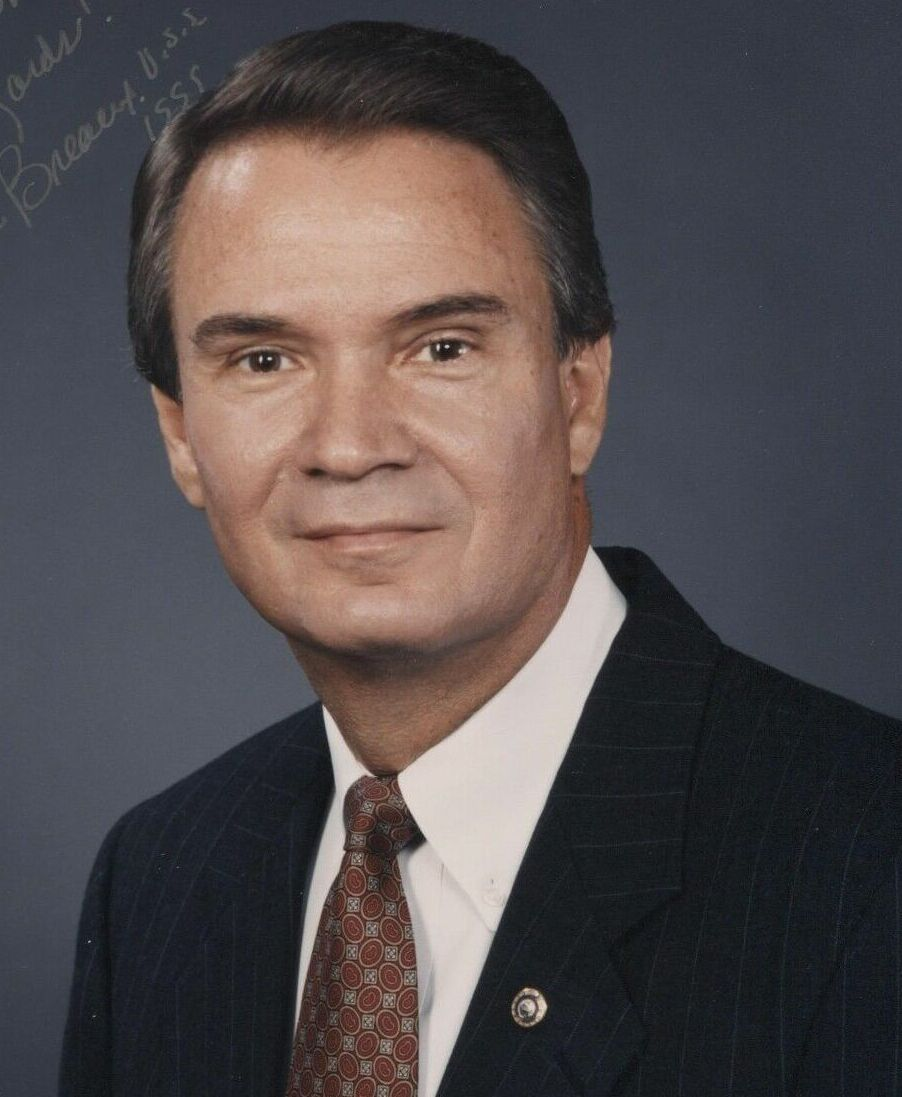

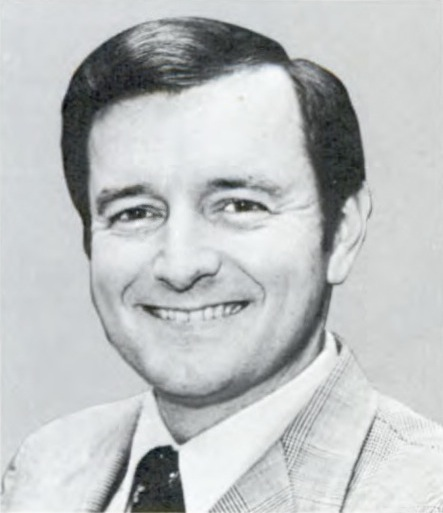

Nominee	John Breaux	Henson Moore	Samuel B. Nunez Jr.
Party	Democratic	Republican	Democratic
General election	447,328; 37.36%	529,433; 44.22%	73,505; 6.14%
Runoff	723,586; 52.82%	646,311; 47.18%	Eliminated
- Breaux: 30–40% 40–50% 50–60% 60–70% 70–80% Moore: 30–40% 40–50% 50–60% 60–70% Nunez: 40–50% Jumonville: 50–60%
U.S. senator before election
Russell B. Long
Democratic
Elected U.S. Senator
John Breaux
Democratic

The 1986 United States Senate election in Louisiana was held on November 4, 1986. Democratic nominee John Breaux defeated Republican nominee Henson Moore with 52.82% of the vote.

== Campaign ==
U.S. Senator Russell B. Long declined to seek another term in the 1986 election. Republican candidate Moore placed first ahead of Democratic candidate Breaux in the primary.

President Ronald Reagan and Vice President George H. W. Bush campaigned in the state two and four times respectively.

Two weeks before the election Judge Dickinson R. Debevoise unsealed an internal memo between Kris Wolfe, the regional director for the Republican National Committee, and Lanny Griffith, the RNC's regional director in the south. The memo was about their usage of Ballot Integrity Groups to "eliminate at least 60-80,000 folks from the rolls" as "this could keep the black vote down considerably". The purge targeted precincts that gave Reagan less than 20% of the vote and removed 34,000 black voters from the rolls in Louisiana.

Moore denied involvement with the scheme, but one of his campaign staffers was mentioned in the memo. Breaux accused the Republicans of conducting a Watergate coverup and voter registration rolls increased by 38,054 before the election. Breaux defeated Moore in the election.

Breaux received 89% of the black vote.

== Primary election ==
Primary elections were held on September 27, 1986.

=== Candidates ===
- Henson Moore, U.S. Representative from Baton Rouge (since 1975)
- John Breaux, U.S. Representative from Crowley (since 1972)
- Samuel B. Nunez Jr., State Senator from Chalmette (President of the Senate since 1983)
- J. E. Jumonville Jr., State Senator from Ventress
- Sherman A. Bernard, Louisiana Insurance Commissioner from Westwego
- Eli Williams
- Robert H. Briggs
- Frank J. McTopy
- Fred Collins
- John H. Myers
- Ken "Cousin Ken" Lewis, perennial candidate
- Vincent Giardina
- Robert M. Ross
- Nels J'Anthony

=== Results ===
1986 United States Senate primary election in Louisiana
Party	Candidate	Votes	%
Republican	Henson Moore	529,433	44.22
Democratic	John Breaux	447,328	37.36
Democratic	Samuel B. Nunez Jr.	73,505	6.14
Democratic	J. E. Jumonville Jr.	53,394	4.46
Democratic	Sherman A. Bernard	52,479	4.38
Democratic	Eli Williams	7,286	0.61
Democratic	Robert H. Briggs	6,953	0.58
Independent	Frank J. McTopy	6,746	0.56
Democratic	Fred Collins	5,341	0.45
Democratic	John H. Myers	4,084	0.34
Democratic	Ken Lewis	3,415	0.29
Independent	Vincent Giardina	2,640	0.22
Republican	Robert M. Ross	2,493	0.21
Independent	Nels J'Anthony	2,144	0.18
Total votes		1,197,241	100.00

== General election ==
=== Candidates ===
- John Breaux, Democratic
- Henson Moore, Republican

=== Results ===
1986 United States Senate election in Louisiana
Party	Candidate	Votes	%	±%
Democratic	John Breaux	723,586	52.82%	
Republican	Henson Moore	646,311	47.18%	
Majority		77,275		
Turnout		1,369,897		
Democratic hold		Swing		

== See also ==
- 1986 United States Senate elections

== Works cited ==
- Black, Earl; Black, Merle (1992). The Vital South: How Presidents Are Elected. Harvard University Press. ISBN 0674941306.
- Moreland, Laurence; Steed, Robert; Baker, Tod, eds. (1991). The 1988 Presidential Election in the South: Continuity Amidst Change in Southern Party Politics. Praeger Publishers. ISBN 0275931455.
