= Clyde C. Holloway =

American politician (1943–2016)

Clyde Holloway
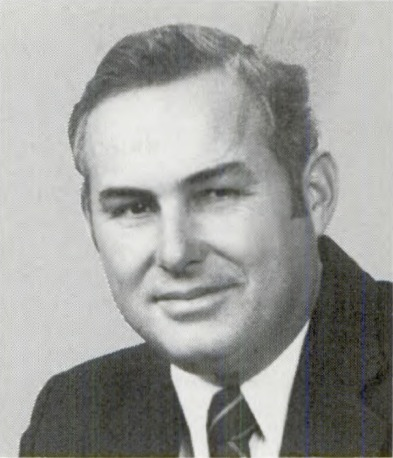

Member of the Louisiana Public Service Commission from the 4th district
- In office May 13, 2009 – October 16, 2016
- Preceded by: Dale Sittig
- Succeeded by: Charles W. DeWitt Jr.

Member of the U.S. House of Representatives from Louisiana's 8th district
- In office January 3, 1987 – January 3, 1993
- Preceded by: Catherine Small Long
- Succeeded by: Constituency abolished

Personal details
- Born: Clyde Cecil Holloway; November 28, 1943 Lecompte, Louisiana, U.S.
- Died: October 16, 2016 (aged 72) Forest Hill, Louisiana, U.S.
- Party: Republican

Clyde Cecil Holloway (November 28, 1943 – October 16, 2016) was an American politician, small business owner, and Republican politician from Louisiana who served as a member of the U.S. House of Representatives and as one of five members of the Louisiana Public Service Commission.

== Early life and entrance into politics ==
Clyde was born to James and Ever Holloway as the fourth of seven children. In 1968, he started the Clyde Holloway Nursery with his wife, Catherine K. Holloway. The couple also operated the Forest Hill Speedway for over two decades.

Holloway first gained public attention in 1980, when he led an anti-busing movement in Rapides Parish, opposing a federal court's desegregation order. He led a group of white parents who seized a local elementary school that was set to be shuttered and operated it for their children. Holloway told reporters that he doubted federal judge Nauman Scott "would send federal marshals" to empty the building. Prompted by local support, Holloway launched his first campaign for Congress, losing to incumbent Gillis Long by more than 40 percentage points.

Holloway faced pushback for a public forum at which he said he would no longer urge his followers to remain calm: "If they want to burn [schools], let them go. We don't have anything left so let them do it." The local daily, The Town Talk, called it a "betrayal" of his supporters and that Holloway had given "his personal go-ahead Friday night to those who think the torching of school buildings is the best solution to the desegregation mess."

After failing to stop the desegregation order, Holloway and his wife launched the Forrest Hill Academy, a segregation academy, in protest and ran it until its closure in 2004.

== Political career ==
Holloway won election to Louisiana's 8th congressional district as a Republican, and was re-elected two more times before being redistricted to the 6th district and losing re-election. Holloway won the first round of votes against Richard Baker, but lost in the runoff with 49.4% of the vote to Baker's 50.6%. He was a candidate for Governor in the 1991 jungle primary, ultimately running a distant fourth behind Governor Buddy Roemer, State Representative and former Ku Klux Klan wizard David Duke, and the ultimate winner, former Governor Edwin Edwards.

== Later career and death ==
Holloway served as a member of the Louisiana Public Service Commission since 2009 and was its chairman at the time of his death. He was buried with a memorial arrangement at Forest Hill Town Hall.

U.S. House of Representatives
Preceded by Catherine Small Long	Member of the U.S. House of Representatives from Louisiana's 8th congressional district 1987–1993	Constituency abolished
