= List of new members of the 100th United States Congress =

The 100th United States Congress began on January 3, 1987. There were 12 new senators (ten Democrats, two Republicans) and 50 new representatives (27 Democrats, 23 Republicans) at the start of the first session. Additionally, one senator (a Republican) and eight representatives (five Democrats, three Republicans) took office on various dates in order to fill vacancies during the 100th Congress before it ended on January 3, 1989.

== Senate ==
=== Took office January 3, 1987 ===
State	Image	Senator	Seniority	Switched party	Prior background	Birth year	Ref
Alabama		Richard Shelby (D)	6th (94th overall)	Yes (Note: Shelby joined the Republican Party in November 1994, during the 103rd Congress.); Defeated Jeremiah Denton (R)	U.S. House of Representatives (Note: Elected in the 96th Congress, serving from 1979 to 1987 in the Alabama's 7th congressional district.); Alabama Senate	1934	
Arizona		John McCain (R)	8th (96th overall)	No; Open seat; replaced Barry Goldwater (R)	U.S. House of Representatives (Note: Elected in the 98th Congress, serving from 1983 to 1987 in the Arizona's 1st congressional district.); U.S. Navy Captain	1936	
Colorado		Tim Wirth (D)	3rd (91st overall)	No; Open seat; replaced Gary Hart (D)	U.S. House of Representatives (Note: Elected in the 94th Congress, serving from 1975 to 1987 in the Colorado's 2nd congressional district.); U.S. Army Reserve	1939	
Florida		Bob Graham (D)	10th (98th overall)	Yes; Defeated Paula Hawkins (R)	Governor of Florida; Florida Senate; Florida House of Representatives	1936	
Georgia		Wyche Fowler (D)	5th (93rd overall)	Yes; Defeated Mack Mattingly (R)	U.S. House of Representatives (Note: Elected in the 95th Congress, serving from 1977 to 1987 in the Georgia's 5th congressional district.); Atlanta City Council; U.S. Army	1940	
Louisiana		John Breaux (D)	1st (89th overall)	No; Open seat; replaced Russell B. Long (D)	U.S. House of Representatives (Note: Elected in the 92nd Congress, serving from 1972 to 1987 in the Louisiana's 7th congressional district.)	1944	
Maryland		Barbara Mikulski (D)	4th (92nd overall)	Yes; Open seat; replaced Charles Mathias (R)	U.S. House of Representatives (Note: Elected in the 95th Congress, serving from 1977 to 1987 in the Maryland's 3rd congressional district.); Baltimore City Council	1936	
Missouri		Kit Bond (R)	11th (99th overall)	Yes; Open seat; replaced Thomas Eagleton (D)	Governor of Missouri; State Auditor of Missouri	1939	
Nevada		Harry Reid (D)	9th (97th overall)	Yes; Open seat; replaced Paul Laxalt (R)	U.S. House of Representatives (Note: Elected in the 98th Congress, serving from 1983 to 1987 in the Nevada's 1st congressional district.); Chair of the Nevada Gaming Commission; Lieutenant Governor of Nevada; Nevada Assembly	1939	
North Dakota		Kent Conrad (D–NPL)	12th (100th overall)	Yes; Defeated Mark Andrews (R)	North Dakota Tax Commissioner	1948	
South Dakota		Tom Daschle (D)	7th (95th overall)	Yes; Defeated James Abdnor (R)	U.S. House of Representatives (Note: Elected in the 95th Congress, serving in the South Dakota's 1st congressional district from 1979 to 1983, and in the South Dakota's at-large congressional district from 1983 to 1987.); U.S. Air Force	1947	
Washington		Brock Adams (D)	2nd (90th overall)	Yes; Defeated Slade Gorton (R)	U.S. Secretary of Transportation; U.S. House of Representatives (Note: Elected in the 89th Congress, serving from 1965 to 1977 in the Washington's 7th congressional district.); U.S. Attorney for W.D. Wash. U.S. Navy	1927	

=== Took office during the 100th Congress ===
State	Image	Senator	Took office	Switched party	Prior background	Birth year	Ref
Nebraska		David Karnes (R)	March 11, 1987	Yes; Appointed; replaced Edward Zorinsky (D)	Federal Home Loan Bank of Topeka	1948	

== House of Representatives ==
=== Took office January 3, 1987 ===
District	Representative	Switched party	Prior background	Birth year	Ref
Alabama 7	Claude Harris Jr. (D)	No	State Circuit Judge	1940	
Arizona 1	John Jacob Rhodes III (R)	No	Lawyer	1943	
Arizona 4	Jon Kyl (R)	No	Attorney	1942	
California 2	Wally Herger (R)	No	State Assemblyman	1945	
California 12	Ernie Konnyu (R)	No	State Assemblyman	1937	
California 21	Elton Gallegly (R)	No	Mayor of Simi Valley	1944	
Colorado 2	David Skaggs (D)	No	State Representative	1943	
Colorado 3	Ben Nighthorse Campbell (D)	Yes	State Representative	1933	
Colorado 5	Joel Hefley (R)	No	State Senator	1935	
Florida 2	Bill Grant (D)	No	State Senator	1943	
Georgia 5	John Lewis (D)	No	City Councilor	1940	
Hawaii 1	Pat Saiki (R)	Yes	State Senator	1930	
Illinois 4	Jack Davis (R)	No	State Representative	1935	
Illinois 14	Dennis Hastert (R)	No	State Representative	1942	
Indiana 5	Jim Jontz (D)	Yes	State Senator	1951	
Iowa 3	David R. Nagle (D)	Yes	State Party Chair	1943	
Iowa 6	Fred Grandy (R)	Yes	Actor	1948	
Kentucky 4	Jim Bunning (R)	No	State Senator	1931	
Louisiana 6	Richard Baker (R)	No	State Representative	1948	
Louisiana 7	Jimmy Hayes (D)	No	Lawyer	1946	
Louisiana 8	Clyde C. Holloway (R)	Yes	Businessman	1943	
Maine 1	Joseph E. Brennan (D)	Yes	Governor of Maine	1934	
Maryland 3	Ben Cardin (D)	No	State House Speaker	1943	
Maryland 4	Tom McMillen (D)	Yes	Professional basketball player	1952	
Maryland 7	Kweisi Mfume (D)	No	City Councilor	1948	
Maryland 8	Connie Morella (R)	Yes	State Delegate	1931	
Massachusetts 8	Joseph P. Kennedy II (D)	No	President of Citizens Energy Corporation	1952	
Michigan 4	Fred Upton (R)	No	Congressional staffer	1953	
Mississippi 2	Mike Espy (D)	Yes	Attorney	1953	
Missouri 2	Jack Buechner (R)	Yes	State Representative	1940	
Nevada 1	James Bilbray (D)	No	State Senator	1938	
New York 1	George J. Hochbrueckner (D)	Yes	State Assemblyman	1938	
New York 6	Floyd Flake (D)	No	Pastor	1945	
New York 30	Louise Slaughter (D)	Yes	State Assemblywoman	1929	
New York 34	Amo Houghton (R)	Yes	Business executive	1926	
North Carolina 3	Martin Lancaster (D)	No	State Representative	1943	
North Carolina 4	David Price (D)	Yes	Professor	1940	
North Carolina 10	Cass Ballenger (R)	No	State Senator	1926	
North Carolina 11	James M. Clarke (D)	Yes	U.S. Representative (Note: Previously elected to the 98th Congress, serving from 1983 to 1985.)	1917	
Ohio 8	Donald "Buz" Lukens (R)	No	State Senator	1931	
Ohio 14	Tom Sawyer (D)	No	Mayor of Akron	1945	
Oklahoma 1	Jim Inhofe (R)	Yes	Mayor of Tulsa	1934	
Oregon 4	Peter DeFazio (D)	No	County Commissioner	1947	
Pennsylvania 7	Curt Weldon (R)	Yes	County Councilor	1947	
South Carolina 1	Arthur Ravenel Jr. (R)	No	State Senator	1927	
South Carolina 4	Liz J. Patterson (D)	Yes	State Senator	1939	
South Dakota at-large	Tim Johnson (D)	No	State Senator	1946	
Texas 21	Lamar Smith (R)	No	County Commissioner	1947	
Utah 2	Wayne Owens (D)	Yes	U.S. Representative (Note: Previously elected to the 93rd Congress, serving from 1973 to 1975.)	1937	
Virginia 2	Owen B. Pickett (D)	Yes	State Delegate	1930	

=== Took office during the 100th Congress ===
District	Representative	Took office	Switched party	Prior background	Birth year	Ref
California 5	Nancy Pelosi (D)	June 2, 1987	No	State Party Chair	1940	
Connecticut 4	Chris Shays (R)	August 18, 1987	No	State Representative	1945	
Tennessee 5	Bob Clement (D)	January 19, 1988	No	President of Cumberland University	1943	
Louisiana 4	Jim McCrery (R)	April 16, 1988	Yes	Congressional staffer	1949	
Virginia 5	Lewis F. Payne Jr. (D)	June 14, 1988	No	Business executive	1945	
Illinois 21	Jerry Costello (D)	August 9, 1988	No	County Board Member	1949	
New Jersey 3	Frank Pallone (D)	November 8, 1988	No	State Senator	1951	
Tennessee 2	Jimmy Duncan (R)	November 8, 1988	No	County Court Judge	1947	

== See also ==
- List of United States representatives in the 100th Congress
- List of United States senators in the 100th Congress

== Notes ==
Preceded by New members of the 99th Congress	New members of the 100th Congress; 1987–1989	Succeeded by New members of the 101st Congress
