= List of new members of the 99th United States Congress =

The 99th United States Congress began on January 3, 1985. There were five new senators (three Democrats, two Republicans) and 41 new representatives (11 Democrats, 30 Republicans), as well as two new delegates (one Democrat, one Republican), at the start of the first session. Additionally, three senators (two Democrats, one Republican) and five representatives (four Democrats, one Republican) took office on various dates in order to fill vacancies during the 99th Congress before it ended on January 3, 1987.

== Senate ==
=== Took office January 3, 1985 ===
State	Image	Senator	Seniority	Switched party	Prior background	Birth year	Ref
Illinois		Paul Simon (D)	1st (95th overall)	Yes; Defeated Charles H. Percy (R)	U.S. House of Representatives (Note: Elected to the 94th Congress, serving from 1975 to 1983 in the Illinois's 24th congressional district and from 1983 to 1985 in the 22nd district.); Lieutenant Governor of Illinois; U.S. Army Private	1928	
Iowa		Tom Harkin (D)	2nd (96th overall)	Yes; Defeated Roger Jepsen (R)	U.S. House of Representatives (Note: Elected to the 94th Congress, serving from 1975 to 1985 in the Iowa's 5th congressional district.); U.S. Navy Reserve Commander	1939	
Kentucky		Mitch McConnell (R)	5th (99th overall)	Yes; Defeated Walter Dee Huddleston (D)	Jefferson County Judge/Executive; Acting U.S. Assistant Attorney General	1942	
Tennessee		Al Gore (D)	3rd (97th overall)	Yes; Open seat; replaced Howard Baker (R)	U.S. House of Representatives (Note: Elected to the 95th Congress, serving from 1977 to 1983 in the Tennessee's 4th congressional district and from 1983 to 1985 in the 6th district.); U.S. Army Specialist	1948	
Texas		Phil Gramm (R)	4th (98th overall)	No; Open seat; replaced John Tower (R)	U.S. House of Representatives (Note: Elected to the 96th Congress, serving from 1979 to 1983 and 1983 to 1985 in the Texas's 6th congressional district.)	1942	

=== Took office during the 99th Congress ===
State	Image	Senator	Took office	Switched party	Prior background	Birth year	Ref
West Virginia		Jay Rockefeller (D)	January 15, 1985 (Note: Rockefeller was duely elected in November 1984, but chose to delay the start of his service in the Senate by a few days until the end of his term as Governor of West Virginia.)	No; Open seat; replaced Jennings Randolph (D)	Governor of West Virginia; Secretary of State of West Virginia; West Virginia House of Delegates	1937	
North Carolina		Jim Broyhill (R)	July 14, 1986	No; Appointed; replaced John Porter East (R)	U.S. House of Representatives (Note: Elected to the 88th Congress, serving from 1963 to 1969 in the North Carolina's 9th congressional district and from 1969 to 1986 in the 10th district.)	1927	
North Carolina		Terry Sanford (D)	December 10, 1986	Yes; Defeated Jim Broyhill (R)	President of Duke University; Governor of North Carolina; North Carolina Senate; U.S. Army First Lieutenant	1917	

== House of Representatives ==
=== Took office January 3, 1985 ===
District	Representative	Switched party	Prior background	Birth year	Ref
Alabama 1	Sonny Callahan (R)	No	State Senator	1932	
Arizona 5	Jim Kolbe (R)	Yes	State Senator	1942	
Arkansas 2	Tommy F. Robinson (D)	Yes (Note: Robinson joined the Republican Party in July 1989, during the 101st Congress.)	Sheriff	1942	
California 38	Bob Dornan (R)	Yes	U.S. Representative (Note: Previously elected to the 95th Congress, serving from 1977 to 1983.)	1933	
Colorado 3	Michael L. Strang (R)	Yes	State Representative	1929	
Connecticut 5	John G. Rowland (R)	Yes	State Representative	1957	
Georgia 4	Pat Swindall (R)	Yes	Lawyer	1950	
Idaho 2	Richard H. Stallings (D)	Yes	Educator	1940	
Illinois 13	Harris Fawell (R)	No	State Senator	1929	
Illinois 14	John E. Grotberg (R)	No	State Senator	1925	
Illinois 19	Terry L. Bruce (D)	Yes	State Senator	1944	
Illinois 22	Kenneth J. Gray (D)	No	U.S. Representative (Note: Previously elected to the 84th Congress, serving from 1955 to 1974.)	1924	
Indiana 1	Pete Visclosky (D)	No	Congressional staffer	1949	
Iowa 5	Jim Ross Lightfoot (R)	Yes	Broadcaster	1938	
Kansas 3	Jan Meyers (R)	No	State Senator	1928	
Maryland 2	Helen Delich Bentley (R)	Yes	Chair of the FMC	1923	
Massachusetts 5	Chester G. Atkins (D)	No	State Senator	1948	
Michigan 5	Paul B. Henry (R)	No	State Senator	1942	
Michigan 10	Bill Schuette (R)	Yes	Lawyer	1953	
New Hampshire 1	Bob Smith (R)	Yes	Educator	1941	
New Jersey 11	Dean Gallo (R)	Yes	State Assemblyman	1935	
New York 9	Thomas Manton (D)	No	City Councilor	1932	
New York 20	Joe DioGuardi (R)	Yes	Accountant	1940	
New York 30	Fred J. Eckert (R)	No	U.S. Ambassador (Note: Simultaneously served as ambassador to Fiji, Kiribati, Tonga, and Tuvalu.)	1941	
North Carolina 4	Bill Cobey (R)	Yes	Athletic administrator	1939	
North Carolina 6	Howard Coble (R)	Yes	State Representative	1931	
North Carolina 9	Alex McMillan (R)	No	CEO of Harris Teeter	1932	
North Carolina 11	Bill Hendon (R)	Yes	U.S. Representative (Note: Previously elected to the 97th Congress, serving from 1981 to 1983.)	1944	
Ohio 17	James Traficant (D)	Yes	Sheriff	1941	
Pennsylvania 11	Paul Kanjorski (D)	No	Attorney	1937	
Tennessee 6	Bart Gordon (D)	No	State Party Chair	1949	
Texas 6	Joe Barton (R)	No	Engineer	1949	
Texas 13	Beau Boulter (R)	Yes	City Commissioner	1942	
Texas 14	Mac Sweeney (R)	Yes	White House staffer	1955	
Texas 19	Larry Combest (R)	Yes	Businessman	1945	
Texas 22	Tom DeLay (R)	No	State Representative	1947	
Texas 23	Albert Bustamante (D)	No	County Commissioner	1935	
Texas 26	Dick Armey (R)	Yes	Economist	1940	
Utah 2	David Smith Monson (R)	No	Lieutenant Governor of Utah	1945	
Virginia 7	D. French Slaughter Jr. (R)	No	State Delegate	1925	
Washington 1	John Miller (R)	No	City Council President	1938	

==== Non-voting members ====
District	Delegate	Switched party	Prior background	Birth year	Ref
Guam at-large	Vicente T. Blaz (R)	Yes	USMC Brigadier General	1928	
Puerto Rico at-large	Jaime Fuster (PD/D)	Yes/No (Note: The previous delegate, Baltasar Corrada del Río, was registered as New Progressive/Democratic.)	U.S. Deputy Assistant Attorney General	1941	

=== Took office during the 99th Congress ===
District	Representative	Took office	Switched party	Prior background	Birth year	Ref
Louisiana 8	Catherine Small Long (D)	March 30, 1985	No	Congressional staffer	1924	
Texas 1	Jim Chapman (D)	August 3, 1985	No	District attorney	1945	
New York 6	Alton Waldon (D)	June 10, 1986	No	State Assemblyman	1936	
Hawaii 1	Neil Abercrombie (D)	September 20, 1986	No	State Representative	1938	
North Carolina 10	Cass Ballenger (R)	November 4, 1986	No	State Senator	1926	

== See also ==
- List of United States representatives in the 99th Congress
- List of United States senators in the 99th Congress

== Notes ==
Preceded by New members of the 98th Congress	New members of the 99th Congress; 1985–1987	Succeeded by New members of the 100th Congress
