= Steve Buyer =

American politician (born 1958)

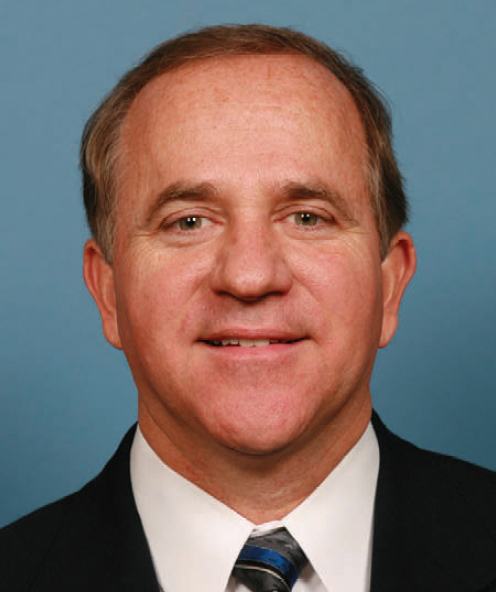

Ranking Member of the House Veterans' Affairs Committee
- In office January 3, 2007 – January 3, 2011
- Preceded by: Lane Evans
- Succeeded by: Bob Filner

Chair of the House Veterans' Affairs Committee
- In office January 3, 2005 – January 3, 2007
- Preceded by: Chris Smith
- Succeeded by: Bob Filner

Member of the U.S. House of Representatives from Indiana
- In office January 3, 1993 – January 3, 2011
- Preceded by: Jim Jontz
- Succeeded by: Todd Rokita
- Constituency: 5th district (1993–2003); 4th district (2003–2011)

Personal details
- Born: Stephen Earle Buyer; November 26, 1958 (age 67) Rensselaer, Indiana, U.S.
- Party: Republican
- Spouse: Joni Buyer
- Children: 2
- Education: The Citadel (BS); Valparaiso University (JD)

Military service
- Branch: United States Army
- Service years: 1984–1987 (active); 1980–2011 (reserve)
- Rank: Colonel
- Unit: Army JAG Corps
- Conflict: Gulf War
- Criminal details
- Criminal information
- Status: Pardoned
- Criminal charges: Insider trading
- Penalty: 22 months in prison Forfeit $354,027; Pay a 10,000 dollar fine

Stephen Earle Buyer (/ˈbuːjər/ BOO-yər; born November 26, 1958) is an American Republican former politician who served as the U.S. representative for Indiana's 4th congressional district, and 5th district, from 1993 until 2011.

In July 2022, Buyer was arrested and charged with insider trading for buying shares of Sprint and Navigant Consulting before both were acquired by other companies, which he knew before the information was made public. Buyer was found guilty in 2023 and sentenced to 22 months in prison. He later received a federal pardon from President Donald Trump in June 2026.

Buyer served as one of the House managers (prosecutors) in the impeachment trial of President Bill Clinton in 1999. He chaired the House Committee on Veterans' Affairs from 2005 to 2007.

On January 29, 2010, Buyer announced he would not seek a tenth term to the House to spend more time with his wife, who had an incurable autoimmune disease. Buyer was under investigation for ethics violations with respect to the Frontier Foundation that he had founded. In 2012, Buyer started working for R.J. Reynolds, promoting the use of smokeless tobacco.

== Early life, education and career ==
Buyer was born in Rensselaer, Indiana. In 1976, he graduated from North White High School, where he had been class president. In 1980, he received a Bachelor of Science in business administration and management from The Citadel, The Military College of South Carolina, and in 1984, he received a Juris Doctor from the Valparaiso University School of Law.

Buyer served three years on active duty in the Army between 1984 and 1987. His first civilian job, from 1987 to 1998, was as Indiana state deputy attorney general; he then started his own private law practice. He was elected to the U.S. House of Representatives in November 1992, at age 33.

== Military career ==
Buyer attended The JAG School at the University of Virginia and entered U.S. Army JAG Corps. As an Army reserve officer, had three years of active duty after graduating from law school in 1984. During the Gulf War (1990–1991), Buyer, then a captain, spent five months on active duty giving legal counsel to commanders and interrogating Iraqi P.O.W.s.

On March 20, 2003, Buyer announced to Congress that "I have been called to active duty in the United States Army. Pending further orders, I request immediate indefinite leave of the United States House of Representatives to accommodate my military duties." He also said that "a need was identified, of which Congressman Buyer has the unique skill and experience to meet the requirements," to serve in Iraq. Claiming to be called to active duty, he took a leave of absence from Congress.

Buyer spent his paid absence from Congress in his home in Monticello, Indiana. Ten days later, he said he had not been activated, contradicting his previous statement and that he was returning to Congress. Defense Department rules prevent those on active duty from campaigning for and holding elective office. Thus in June 2003, the Indianapolis Star reported that the Army, in a March 31 letter to Buyer signed by Army secretary Thomas White, had rejected Buyer's offer to serve in the Iraq War, because "we are able to meet the need without your participation" and "we are concerned that your presence would put in jeopardy the safety of those serving around you."

In April 2004, Buyer was promoted to colonel in the United States Army Reserve by President George W. Bush in the Oval Office.

== U.S. Representative ==
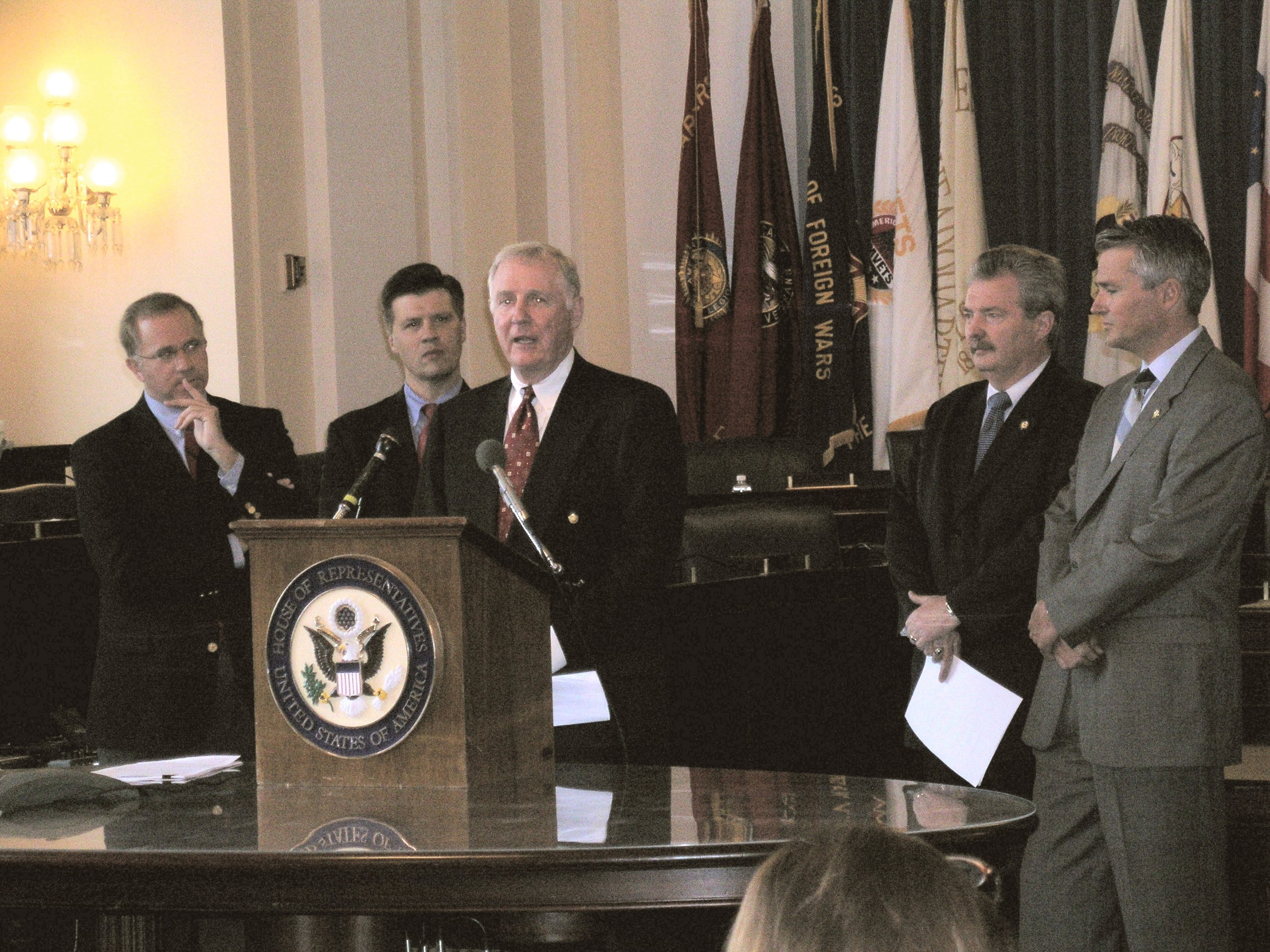
Buyer at a joint press conference with John Hostettler, Dan Burton, Mike Sodrel, and Chris Chocola in 2005

=== Committee assignments ===
- Committee on Energy and Commerce (2001–2010)
  - Subcommittee on Communications, Technology and the Internet
  - Subcommittee on Health
- Committee on Veterans' Affairs (1993–2010)
  - Chairman of the Veterans' Affairs Committee 109th Congress
  - Ranking Member of the Veterans' Affairs Committee 110th and 111th Congresses
- House Committee on Judiciary 1993–1999
- House Armed Services Committee 1993–2001
  - Chairman of the Subcommittee on Military Personnel 105th and 106th Congresses

=== Caucuses ===
- National Guard and Reserve Components Caucus
  - Co-Chairman and Founder
- Congressional Automotive Caucus
- Congressional Steel Caucus

In 1999, Buyer served as one of the House managers (prosecutors) in the impeachment trial of President Bill Clinton.

== Political positions ==
=== Term limits ===
In his 1992 campaign, Buyer supported bringing to a vote on the House floor a Congressional amendment for term limits on members of Congress. He voted for the measure and it received a majority of votes, but not the two-thirds majority needed to pass.

=== Torture ===
Buyer, who interrogated captured Iraqis during the Gulf War, voted against the Detainee Treatment Act of 2005, specifically the no torture amendment offered by Senator John McCain. He reasoned that torture was already unlawful. He stated, "I think the people of Indiana need to know that there's a lot of grandstanding going on here, there's a lot of self-projection."

=== Smoking ===
In June 2009, Buyer became the subject of some prime-time TV news attention when he likened the physical effects of smoking tobacco to those of smoking dried, rolled lettuce or grass when taking the floor against the Family Smoking Prevention and Tobacco Control Act. He stated:

[Y]ou could have smoked that lettuce and you would still end up with the same problems. You could cut the grass in your yard, dry it and roll it up in a cigarette and smoke it, and you're still going to have a lot of problems. It is the smoke that kills, not the nicotine. It's the smoke.

== Political campaigns ==
When Buyer first ran for Congress in 1992, he faced three-term Democratic incumbent Jim Jontz in what was then the 5th District, comprising twenty primarily rural counties in north central Indiana. Republican Bud Hillis had represented the district for 16 years until his retirement in 1986. Jontz, then a state senator, was elected in the face of divided Republican opposition. Buyer defeated Jontz by just over 5,000 votes. He would never face another contest nearly that close, and was re-elected four times from this district with an average of 62 percent of the vote.

In 2002, Buyer's district was renumbered as the 4th District, made up of 12 counties in west central Indiana, after the state lost a district in the 2000s round of redistricting. Buyer had five opponents in the Republican primary, including fellow Republican congressman Brian Kerns. Buyer won with 55 percent of the primary vote. He easily won this heavily Republican district in November with 71 percent of the vote and was re-elected three more times after that with an average of 63 percent of the vote.

=== 2004/2006 ===
In November 2004 and November 2006, Buyer defeated Democrat David Sanders, who was running on a pro-veterans benefits and anti-Iraq war platform.

=== 2008 ===
In November 2008, Buyer defeated Democrat Nels Ackerson, spending $895,000 compared to $845,000 by Ackerson. Buyer won with 60 percent of the vote.

=== 2010 retirement ===
On January 29, 2010, Buyer announced his retirement from Congress. In the following January, Buyer became a lobbyist for McKesson Corp.; as he was prohibited from lobbying Congress due to a one-year "cooling off" period mandated for all retired Congressmen by federal law, he stated that his lobbying would be restricted to the executive branch. in 2012 Buyer started working for R.J. Reynolds, promoting the use of smokeless tobacco.

=== Campaign funds ===
Between January 2006 and October 2009, the most significant combined donations to Buyer's campaigns came from the pharmaceutical industry ($263,000) and the healthcare professional industry ($214,000). In recent years, his largest corporate donors have included Eli Lilly and Company, AT&T Inc. and Reynolds American.

== Frontier Foundation ==
In 2003, Buyer created The Frontier Foundation, whose stated purpose is educational funding for college students. The initial $25,000 to start the foundation came from the pharmaceutical lobbying organization PhRMA. The foundation was located in Buyer's campaign office until 2009, when after a complaint was filed, it moved to an office 3 blocks away. In addition, weeks before that interview, Buyer's campaign finance director, Stephanie (Bowsher) Mattix, who had also managed the Foundation, ceased operating as the Foundation's director. She was receiving a salary from the foundation ranging $12,000–$17,000 a year. Buyer's daughter Colleen was the president of the foundation until August 1, 2009. His son Ryan, in 2009, was director of the foundation, according to filings with the Indiana Secretary of State

In early October 2009, Buyer's press secretary referred questions to the foundation, saying "It's not Congressman Buyer's foundation," although the foundation shared an office with Buyer's campaign office in Monticello. Several days later, Buyer said he had created the foundation, with the goal of creating a sustainable organization to award scholarships to high school seniors.

As of the end of 2008, annual fundraising golf outings had raised more than $880,000 for the foundation. Almost all the contributions were from 20 companies and trade organizations that had interests before the House Energy and Commerce Committee, of which Buyer is a member. As of October 2009, the foundation had not awarded any scholarships, and had given out only $10,500 in charitable grants, almost half of which went to a cancer fund run by the chief Washington lobbyist for Eli Lilly and Company. Buyer said the foundation would need to raise at least $1 million to become self-sustaining; it would then begin awarding scholarships.

In June 2009, Buyer said "there is no connection" between his legislative actions and donations to the foundation. "I'm not an officer. I'm not a board director," he said of his role in the non-profit. "Do I help the foundation? Yes, I do. Do I help other charity groups? Yes, I do."

On January 25, 2010, CREW (Citizens for Responsibility and Ethics in Washington) filed complaints against Rep. Buyer with the Office of Congressional Ethics and the IRS regarding possible ethics and federal tax law violations referencing The Frontier Foundation. The complaint was later dismissed when Buyer announced his retirement from Congress.

In 2018, the Frontier Foundation was closed by Buyer, the only listed officer, without ever having funded a scholarship.

== Insider trading conviction and pardon ==
On July 25, 2022, Buyer was arrested for insider trading; a criminal indictment secured by the U.S. Department of Justice in the Southern District of New York, and a civil complaint by the Securities and Exchange Commission (SEC), were simultaneously filed. According to federal authorities, after leaving Congress in 2011, Buyer formed a consulting firm, the Steve Buyer Group, which provided services to T-Mobile. In March 2018, Buyer attended a golf outing with a T-Mobile executive, from whom he learned about the company's then nonpublic plan to acquire Sprint. Buyer began purchasing Sprint securities the next day, and, ahead of the merger announcement, he acquired a total of $568,000 of Sprint common stock in his personal accounts, a joint account with his cousin, and an acquaintance's account. The complaint also sought disgorgement from Buyer's wife, Joni Lynn Buyer, who profited when Buyer executed unlawful trades in her brokerage account.

At the trial, Karen Hensel, a television reporter, told the jury that Buyer traded stocks for her to help her "catch up" financially after they had an affair. Hensel testified that Buyer did not tell her why he chose Sprint or Navigant.

Buyer was found guilty of four counts of securities fraud on March 10, 2023. On September 19, 2023, he was sentenced to 22 months in prison, ordered to forfeit $354,027 in illegal gains and given a $10,000 fine.

On June 4, 2026, President Trump granted Buyer a full pardon.

== Personal life ==
In 2008, in Golf Digest's list of the top 200 golfers among political power brokers in Washington, Buyer was ranked 32nd, with a handicap of 5.6.

Buyer's daughter Colleen was the president of the Frontier Foundation until August 1, 2009. In 2007, she graduated from Purdue University with a Doctor of Pharmacy (PharmD)

Buyer's son Ryan received a business administration degree from Ball State University in 2008. He was hired in June 2008 as a federal affairs manager for the Pharmaceutical Research and Manufacturers of America (PhRMA), a major lobbying organization in Washington, D.C., and the largest donor to the foundation.

Buyer's wife Joni worked as a Business Systems Analyst at Purdue University, in West Lafayette.

== See also ==
- List of people granted executive clemency in the second Trump presidency

U.S. House of Representatives
Preceded by Jim Jontz	Member of the U.S. House of Representatives from Indiana's 5th congressional district 1993–2003	Succeeded by Dan Burton
Preceded by Mark Souder	Member of the U.S. House of Representatives from Indiana's 4th congressional district 2003–2011	Succeeded by Todd Rokita
Preceded by Chris Smith	Chair of the House Veterans' Affairs Committee; 2005–2007	Succeeded by Bob Filner
Preceded by Lane Evans	Ranking Member of the House Veterans' Affairs Committee; 2007–2011	Succeeded by Bob Filner
U.S. order of precedence (ceremonial)
Preceded by William J. Jefferson as Former U.S. Representative	Order of precedence of the United States as Former U.S. Representative	Succeeded by Marty Russo as Former U.S. Representative
