= List of United States representatives in the 100th Congress =

This is a complete list of United States representatives during the 100th United States Congress listed by seniority.

As an historical article, the districts and party affiliations listed reflect those during the 100th Congress (January 3, 1987 – January 3, 1989). Seats and party affiliations on similar lists for other congresses will be different for certain members.

Seniority depends on the date on which members were sworn into office. Since many members are sworn in on the same day, subsequent ranking is based on previous congressional service of the individual and then by alphabetical order by the last name of the representative.

Committee chairmanship in the House is often associated with seniority. However, party leadership is typically not associated with seniority.

Note: The "*" indicates that the representative/delegate may have served one or more non-consecutive terms while in the House of Representatives of the United States Congress.

== U.S. House seniority list ==
U.S. House seniority
Rank	Representative	Party	District	Seniority date (Previous service, if any)	No.# of term(s)	Notes
1	Jamie Whitten	D	MS-01	November 4, 1941	24th term	Dean of the House
2	Charles Melvin Price	D	IL-21	January 3, 1945	22nd term	Died on April 22, 1988.
3	Charles Edward Bennett	D	FL-03	January 3, 1949	20th term	
4	Peter W. Rodino	D	NJ-10	January 3, 1949	20th term	Left the House in 1989.
5	Edward Boland	D	MA-02	January 3, 1953	18th term	Left the House in 1989.
6	Jack Brooks	D	TX-09	January 3, 1953	18th term	
7	William Natcher	D	KY-02	August 1, 1953	18th term	
8	Dante Fascell	D	FL-19	January 3, 1955	17th term	
9	Jim Wright	D	TX-12	January 3, 1955	17th term	Speaker of the House
10	John Dingell	D	MI-16	December 13, 1955	17th term	
11	William Broomfield	R	MI-18	January 3, 1957	16th term	
12	Robert Michel	R	IL-18	January 3, 1957	16th term	
13	Silvio O. Conte	R	MA-01	January 3, 1959	15th term	
14	Robert Kastenmeier	D	WI-02	January 3, 1959	15th term	
15	Del Latta	R	OH-05	January 3, 1959	15th term	Left the House in 1989.
16	Dan Rostenkowski	D	IL-08	January 3, 1959	15th term	
17	Neal Smith	D	IA-04	January 3, 1959	15th term	
18	Samuel S. Stratton	D	NY-23	January 3, 1959	15th term	Left the House in 1989.
19	Fernand St. Germain	D	RI-01	January 3, 1961	14th term	Left the House in 1989.
20	Mo Udall	D	AZ-02	May 2, 1961	14th term	
21	Henry B. González	D	TX-20	November 4, 1961	14th term	
22	Don Edwards	D	CA-10	January 3, 1963	13th term	
23	Sam Gibbons	D	FL-07	January 3, 1963	13th term	
24	Augustus F. Hawkins	D	CA-29	January 3, 1963	13th term	
25	Frank Horton	R	NY-29	January 3, 1963	13th term	
26	Joseph McDade	R	PA-10	January 3, 1963	13th term	
27	Claude Pepper	D	FL-18	January 3, 1963	13th term	
28	Jimmy Quillen	R	TN-01	January 3, 1963	13th term	
29	Edward R. Roybal	D	CA-25	January 3, 1963	13th term	
30	J. J. Pickle	D	TX-10	December 21, 1963	13th term	
31	Frank Annunzio	D	IL-11	January 3, 1965	12th term	
32	John Conyers	D	MI-01	January 3, 1965	12th term	
33	Bill Dickinson	R	AL-02	January 3, 1965	12th term	
34	John Duncan Sr.	R	TN-02	January 3, 1965	12th term	Died on June 21, 1988.
35	Tom Foley	D	WA-05	January 3, 1965	12th term	
36	William Ford	D	MI-15	January 3, 1965	12th term	
37	Lee Hamilton	D	IN-09	January 3, 1965	12th term	
38	James J. Howard	D	NJ-03	January 3, 1965	12th term	Died on March 25, 1988.
39	Kika De la Garza	D	TX-15	January 3, 1965	12th term	
40	Sidney Yates	D	IL-09	January 3, 1965; Previous service, 1949–1963.	19th term*	
41	Walter B. Jones Sr.	D	NC-01	February 5, 1966	12th term	
42	Guy Vander Jagt	R	MI-09	November 8, 1966	12th term	
43	Tom Bevill	D	AL-04	January 3, 1967	11th term	
44	John Paul Hammerschmidt	R	AR-03	January 3, 1967	11th term	
45	Clarence E. Miller	R	OH-10	January 3, 1967	11th term	
46	Sonny Montgomery	D	MS-03	January 3, 1967	11th term	
47	John Myers	R	IN-07	January 3, 1967	11th term	
48	Bill Nichols	D	AL-03	January 3, 1967	11th term	Died on December 13, 1988.
49	Chalmers Wylie	R	OH-15	January 3, 1967	11th term	
50	Joseph M. Gaydos	D	PA-20	November 5, 1968	11th term	
51	Bill Alexander	D	AR-01	January 3, 1969	10th term	
52	Glenn M. Anderson	D	CA-32	January 3, 1969	10th term	
53	Mario Biaggi	D	NY-19	January 3, 1969	10th term	Resigned on August 5, 1988.
54	William V. Chappell Jr.	D	FL-04	January 3, 1969	10th term	Left the House in 1989.
55	Bill Clay	D	MO-01	January 3, 1969	10th term	
56	Lawrence Coughlin	R	PA-13	January 3, 1969	10th term	
57	Dan Daniel	D	VA-05	January 3, 1969	10th term	Died on January 23, 1988.
58	Hamilton Fish	R	NY-21	January 3, 1969	10th term	
59	Manuel Lujan Jr.	R	NM-01	January 3, 1969	10th term	Left the House in 1989.
60	Louis Stokes	D	OH-21	January 3, 1969	10th term	
61	Gus Yatron	D	PA-06	January 3, 1969	10th term	
62	Ed Jones	D	TN-08	March 25, 1969	10th term	Left the House in 1989.
63	Dave Obey	D	WI-07	April 1, 1969	10th term	
64	Robert A. Roe	D	NJ-08	November 4, 1969	10th term	
65	Phil Crane	R	IL-12	November 25, 1969	10th term	
66	Bill Archer	R	TX-07	January 3, 1971	9th term	
67	Les Aspin	D	WI-01	January 3, 1971	9th term	
68	Ron Dellums	D	CA-08	January 3, 1971	9th term	
69	Bill Frenzel	R	MN-03	January 3, 1971	9th term	
70	Jack Kemp	R	NY-31	January 3, 1971	9th term	Left the House in 1989.
71	Norman F. Lent	R	NY-04	January 3, 1971	9th term	
72	Romano Mazzoli	D	KY-03	January 3, 1971	9th term	
73	Stewart McKinney	R	CT-04	January 3, 1971	9th term	Died on May 7, 1987.
74	Charles B. Rangel	D	NY-16	January 3, 1971	9th term	
75	Floyd Spence	R	SC-02	January 3, 1971	9th term	
76	Bill Young	R	FL-08	January 3, 1971	9th term	
77	George Brown Jr.	D	CA-36	January 3, 1973; Previous service, 1963–1971.	12th term*	
78	Benjamin A. Gilman	R	NY-22	January 3, 1973	8th term	
79	William Lehman	D	FL-17	January 3, 1973	8th term	
80	Trent Lott	R	MS-05	January 3, 1973	8th term	Left the House in 1989.
81	Edward Rell Madigan	R	IL-15	January 3, 1973	8th term	
82	Joe Moakley	D	MA-09	January 3, 1973	8th term	
83	Carlos Moorhead	R	CA-22	January 3, 1973	8th term	
84	Ralph Regula	R	OH-16	January 3, 1973	8th term	
85	Matthew John Rinaldo	R	NJ-07	January 3, 1973	8th term	
86	Charlie Rose	D	NC-07	January 3, 1973	8th term	
87	Patricia Schroeder	D	CO-01	January 3, 1973	8th term	
88	Bud Shuster	R	PA-09	January 3, 1973	8th term	
89	Pete Stark	D	CA-09	January 3, 1973	8th term	
90	Gerry Studds	D	MA-10	January 3, 1973	8th term	
91	Gene Taylor	R	MO-07	January 3, 1973	8th term	Left the House in 1989.
92	Charles Wilson	D	TX-02	January 3, 1973	8th term	
93	Don Young	R	Alaska At-large District	March 6, 1973	8th term	
94	Lindy Boggs	D	LA-02	March 20, 1973	8th term	
95	Cardiss Collins	D	IL-07	June 5, 1973	8th term	
96	John Murtha	D	PA-12	February 5, 1974	8th term	
97	Robert J. Lagomarsino	R	CA-19	March 5, 1974	8th term	
98	J. Bob Traxler	D	MI-08	April 23, 1974	8th term	
99	Les AuCoin	D	OR-01	January 3, 1975	7th term	
100	Don Bonker	D	WA-03	January 3, 1975	7th term	Left the House in 1989.
101	Butler Derrick	D	SC-03	January 3, 1975	7th term	
102	Thomas Downey	D	NY-02	January 3, 1975	7th term	
103	Joseph D. Early	D	MA-03	January 3, 1975	7th term	
104	Glenn English	D	OK-06	January 3, 1975	7th term	
105	James Florio	D	NJ-01	January 3, 1975	7th term	
106	Harold Ford	D	TN-09	January 3, 1975	7th term	
107	Bill Goodling	R	PA-19	January 3, 1975	7th term	
108	Bill Gradison	R	OH-02	January 3, 1975	7th term	
109	Bill Hefner	D	NC-08	January 3, 1975	7th term	
110	Carroll Hubbard	D	KY-01	January 3, 1975	7th term	
111	William Hughes	D	NJ-02	January 3, 1975	7th term	
112	Henry Hyde	R	IL-06	January 3, 1975	7th term	
113	Andrew Jacobs Jr.	D	IN-10	January 3, 1975; Previous service, 1965–1973.	11th term*	
114	Jim Jeffords	R	VT	January 3, 1975	7th term	Left the House in 1989.
115	John LaFalce	D	NY-32	January 3, 1975	7th term	
116	Marilyn Lloyd	D	TN-03	January 3, 1975	7th term	
117	Matthew F. McHugh	D	NY-28	January 3, 1975	7th term	
118	George Miller	D	CA-07	January 3, 1975	7th term	
119	Norman Mineta	D	CA-13	January 3, 1975	7th term	
120	Stephen Neal	D	NC-05	January 3, 1975	7th term	
121	Henry J. Nowak	D	NY-33	January 3, 1975	7th term	
122	Jim Oberstar	D	MN-08	January 3, 1975	7th term	
123	Marty Russo	D	IL-03	January 3, 1975	7th term	
124	James H. Scheuer	D	NY-08	January 3, 1975; Previous service, 1965–1973.	11th term*	
125	Richard T. Schulze	R	PA-05	January 3, 1975	7th term	
126	Philip Sharp	D	IN-02	January 3, 1975	7th term	
127	Virginia D. Smith	R	NE-03	January 3, 1975	7th term	
128	Stephen J. Solarz	D	NY-13	January 3, 1975	7th term	
129	Henry Waxman	D	CA-24	January 3, 1975	7th term	
130	Earl Thomas Coleman	R	MO-06	November 2, 1976	7th term	
131	Ed Markey	D	MA-07	November 2, 1976	7th term	
132	Daniel Akaka	D	HI-02	January 3, 1977	6th term	
133	Douglas Applegate	D	OH-18	January 3, 1977	6th term	
134	Robert Badham	R	CA-40	January 3, 1977	6th term	Left the House in 1989.
135	Doug Barnard Jr.	D	GA-10	January 3, 1977	6th term	
136	Anthony C. Beilenson	D	CA-23	January 3, 1977	6th term	
137	David Bonior	D	MI-12	January 3, 1977	6th term	
138	Norm Dicks	D	WA-06	January 3, 1977	6th term	
139	Mickey Edwards	R	OK-05	January 3, 1977	6th term	
140	Ronnie Flippo	D	AL-05	January 3, 1977	6th term	
141	Dick Gephardt	D	MO-03	January 3, 1977	6th term	
142	Dan Glickman	D	KS-04	January 3, 1977	6th term	
143	Jerry Huckaby	D	LA-05	January 3, 1977	6th term	
144	Andy Ireland	R	FL-10	January 3, 1977	6th term	
145	Ed Jenkins	D	GA-09	January 3, 1977	6th term	
146	Dale Kildee	D	MI-07	January 3, 1977	6th term	
147	Jim Leach	R	IA-01	January 3, 1977	6th term	
148	Tom Luken	D	OH-01	January 3, 1977; Previous service, 1974–1975.	7th term*	
149	Ron Marlenee	R	MT-02	January 3, 1977	6th term	
150	Austin Murphy	D	PA-22	January 3, 1977	6th term	
151	Mary Rose Oakar	D	OH-20	January 3, 1977	6th term	
152	Leon Panetta	D	CA-16	January 3, 1977	6th term	
153	Donald J. Pease	D	OH-13	January 3, 1977	6th term	
154	Carl Pursell	R	MI-02	January 3, 1977	6th term	
155	Nick Rahall	D	WV-04	January 3, 1977	6th term	
156	Ike Skelton	D	MO-04	January 3, 1977	6th term	
157	Bob Stump	R	AZ-03	January 3, 1977	6th term	
158	Bruce Vento	D	MN-04	January 3, 1977	6th term	
159	Harold Volkmer	D	MO-09	January 3, 1977	6th term	
160	Doug Walgren	D	PA-18	January 3, 1977	6th term	
161	Robert Walker	R	PA-16	January 3, 1977	6th term	
162	Wes Watkins	D	OK-03	January 3, 1977	6th term	
163	Theodore S. Weiss	D	NY-17	January 3, 1977	6th term	
164	Arlan Stangeland	R	MN-07	February 22, 1977	6th term	
165	Bob Livingston	R	LA-01	August 27, 1977	6th term	
166	S. William Green	R	NY-15	February 14, 1978	6th term	
167	Robert Garcia	D	NY-18	February 21, 1978	6th term	
168	Beryl Anthony Jr.	D	AR-04	January 3, 1979	5th term	
169	Doug Bereuter	R	NE-01	January 3, 1979	5th term	
170	Bill Boner	D	TN-05	January 3, 1979	5th term	Resigned on October 5, 1987.
171	Beverly Byron	D	MD-06	January 3, 1979	5th term	
172	Dick Cheney	R	WY	January 3, 1979	5th term	
173	Bill Clinger	R	PA-23	January 3, 1979	5th term	
174	Tony Coelho	D	CA-15	January 3, 1979	5th term	
175	Jim Courter	R	NJ-12	January 3, 1979	5th term	
176	William E. Dannemeyer	R	CA-39	January 3, 1979	5th term	
177	Robert William Davis	R	MI-11	January 3, 1979	5th term	
178	Julian C. Dixon	D	CA-28	January 3, 1979	5th term	
179	Brian J. Donnelly	D	MA-11	January 3, 1979	5th term	
180	Vic Fazio	D	CA-04	January 3, 1979	5th term	
181	Martin Frost	D	TX-24	January 3, 1979	5th term	
182	Newt Gingrich	R	GA-06	January 3, 1979	5th term	
183	William H. Gray	D	PA-02	January 3, 1979	5th term	
184	Frank Joseph Guarini	D	NJ-14	January 3, 1979	5th term	
185	Tony Hall	D	OH-03	January 3, 1979	5th term	
186	Larry J. Hopkins	R	KY-06	January 3, 1979	5th term	
187	Earl Dewitt Hutto	D	FL-01	January 3, 1979	5th term	
188	Marvin Leath	D	TX-11	January 3, 1979	5th term	
189	Mickey Leland	D	TX-18	January 3, 1979	5th term	
190	Jerry Lewis	R	CA-35	January 3, 1979	5th term	
191	Mike Lowry	D	WA-07	January 3, 1979	5th term	Left the House in 1989.
192	Dan Lungren	R	CA-42	January 3, 1979	5th term	Left the House in 1989.
193	Bob Matsui	D	CA-03	January 3, 1979	5th term	
194	Nicholas Mavroules	D	MA-06	January 3, 1979	5th term	
195	Dan Mica	D	FL-14	January 3, 1979	5th term	Left the House in 1989.
196	Bill Nelson	D	FL-11	January 3, 1979	5th term	
197	Chip Pashayan	R	CA-17	January 3, 1979	5th term	
198	Donald L. Ritter	R	PA-15	January 3, 1979	5th term	
199	Toby Roth	R	WI-08	January 3, 1979	5th term	
200	Martin Olav Sabo	D	MN-05	January 3, 1979	5th term	
201	James Sensenbrenner	R	WI-09	January 3, 1979	5th term	
202	Norman D. Shumway	R	CA-14	January 3, 1979	5th term	
203	Olympia Snowe	R	ME-02	January 3, 1979	5th term	
204	Charles Stenholm	D	TX-17	January 3, 1979	5th term	
205	Gerald Solomon	R	NY-24	January 3, 1979	5th term	
206	Mike Synar	D	OK-02	January 3, 1979	5th term	
207	Al Swift	D	WA-02	January 3, 1979	5th term	
208	Tom Tauke	R	IA-02	January 3, 1979	5th term	
209	Bill Thomas	R	CA-20	January 3, 1979	5th term	
210	Bob Whittaker	R	KS-05	January 3, 1979	5th term	
211	Pat Williams	D	MT-01	January 3, 1979	5th term	
212	Howard Wolpe	D	MI-03	January 3, 1979	5th term	
213	Tom Petri	R	WI-06	April 3, 1979	5th term	
214	John Porter	R	IL-10	January 22, 1980	5th term	
215	Billy Tauzin	D	LA-03	May 22, 1980	5th term	
216	George W. Crockett Jr.	D	MI-13	November 4, 1980	5th term	
217	Thomas Bliley	R	VA-03	January 3, 1981	4th term	
218	Hank Brown	R	CO-04	January 3, 1981	4th term	
219	Dan Coats	R	IN-04	January 3, 1981	4th term	Left the House in 1989.
220	William Coyne	D	PA-14	January 3, 1981	4th term	
221	Larry Craig	R	ID-01	January 3, 1981	4th term	
222	Hal Daub	R	NE-02	January 3, 1981	4th term	Left the House in 1989.
223	Byron Dorgan	D	ND	January 3, 1981	4th term	
224	David Dreier	R	CA-33	January 3, 1981	4th term	
225	Bernard J. Dwyer	D	NJ-06	January 3, 1981	4th term	
226	Mervyn M. Dymally	D	CA-31	January 3, 1981	4th term	
227	Roy Dyson	D	MD-01	January 3, 1981	4th term	
228	Dennis E. Eckart	D	OH-11	January 3, 1981	4th term	
229	Bill Emerson	R	MO-08	January 3, 1981	4th term	
230	Jack Fields	R	TX-08	January 3, 1981	4th term	
231	Tom Foglietta	D	PA-01	January 3, 1981	4th term	
232	Barney Frank	D	MA-04	January 3, 1981	4th term	
233	Sam Gejdenson	D	CT-02	January 3, 1981	4th term	
234	Judd Gregg	R	NH-02	January 3, 1981	4th term	Left the House in 1989.
235	Steve Gunderson	R	WI-03	January 3, 1981	4th term	
236	Ralph Hall	D	TX-04	January 3, 1981	4th term	
237	James Hansen	R	UT-01	January 3, 1981	4th term	
238	Charles Floyd Hatcher	D	GA-02	January 3, 1981	4th term	
239	Dennis M. Hertel	D	MI-14	January 3, 1981	4th term	
240	John P. Hiler	R	IN-03	January 3, 1981	4th term	
241	Duncan Hunter	R	CA-45	January 3, 1981	4th term	
242	Tom Lantos	D	CA-11	January 3, 1981	4th term	
243	Bill Lowery	R	CA-41	January 3, 1981	4th term	
244	David O'Brien Martin	R	NY-26	January 3, 1981	4th term	
245	Lynn Morley Martin	R	IL-16	January 3, 1981	4th term	
246	Bill McCollum	R	FL-05	January 3, 1981	4th term	
247	Dave McCurdy	D	OK-04	January 3, 1981	4th term	
248	Bob McEwen	R	OH-06	January 3, 1981	4th term	
249	Raymond J. McGrath	R	NY-05	January 3, 1981	4th term	
250	Guy Molinari	R	NY-14	January 3, 1981	4th term	
251	Sid Morrison	R	WA-04	January 3, 1981	4th term	
252	Stanford Parris	R	VA-08	January 3, 1981; Previous service, 1973–1975.	5th term*	
253	Pat Roberts	R	KS-01	January 3, 1981	4th term	
254	Buddy Roemer	D	LA-04	January 3, 1981	4th term	Resigned on March 14, 1988.
255	Hal Rogers	R	KY-05	January 3, 1981	4th term	
256	Marge Roukema	R	NJ-05	January 3, 1981	4th term	
257	Gus Savage	D	IL-02	January 3, 1981	4th term	
258	Claudine Schneider	R	RI-02	January 3, 1981	4th term	
259	Chuck Schumer	D	NY-10	January 3, 1981	4th term	
260	E. Clay Shaw Jr.	R	FL-15	January 3, 1981	4th term	
261	Joe Skeen	R	NM-02	January 3, 1981	4th term	
262	Christopher Smith	R	NJ-04	January 3, 1981	4th term	
263	Denny Smith	R	OR-05	January 3, 1981	4th term	
264	Vin Weber	R	MN-02	January 3, 1981	4th term	
265	Frank Wolf	R	VA-10	January 3, 1981	4th term	
266	George C. Wortley	R	NY-27	January 3, 1981	4th term	Left the House in 1989.
267	Ron Wyden	D	OR-03	January 3, 1981	4th term	
268	Steny H. Hoyer	D	MD-05	May 19, 1981	4th term	
269	Mike Oxley	R	OH-04	June 25, 1981	4th term	
270	Wayne Dowdy	D	MS-04	July 7, 1981	4th term	Left the House in 1989.
271	Barbara B. Kennelly	D	CT-01	January 12, 1982	4th term	
272	Matthew G. Martínez	D	CA-30	July 13, 1982	4th term	
273	Michael A. Andrews	D	TX-25	January 3, 1983	3rd term	
274	Steve Bartlett	R	TX-03	January 3, 1983	3rd term	
275	Jim Bates	D	CA-44	January 3, 1983	3rd term	
276	Herbert Bateman	R	VA-01	January 3, 1983	3rd term	
277	Howard Berman	D	CA-26	January 3, 1983	3rd term	
278	Michael Bilirakis	R	FL-09	January 3, 1983	3rd term	
279	Sherwood Boehlert	R	NY-25	January 3, 1983	3rd term	
280	Robert A. Borski Jr.	D	PA-03	January 3, 1983	3rd term	
281	Douglas H. Bosco	D	CA-01	January 3, 1983	3rd term	
282	Rick Boucher	D	VA-09	January 3, 1983	3rd term	
283	Barbara Boxer	D	CA-06	January 3, 1983	3rd term	
284	John Bryant	D	TX-05	January 3, 1983	3rd term	
285	Dan Burton	R	IN-06	January 3, 1983	3rd term	
286	Thomas Carper	D	DE	January 3, 1983	3rd term	
287	Bob Carr	D	MI-06	January 3, 1983; Previous service, 1975–1981.	6th term*	
288	Rod Chandler	R	WA-08	January 3, 1983	3rd term	
289	Ron Coleman	D	TX-16	January 3, 1983	3rd term	
290	Jim Cooper	D	TN-04	January 3, 1983	3rd term	
291	Mike DeWine	R	OH-07	January 3, 1983	3rd term	
292	Richard Durbin	D	IL-20	January 3, 1983	3rd term	
293	Ben Erdreich	D	AL-06	January 3, 1983	3rd term	
294	Lane Evans	D	IL-17	January 3, 1983	3rd term	
295	Ed Feighan	D	OH-19	January 3, 1983	3rd term	
296	George Gekas	R	PA-17	January 3, 1983	3rd term	
297	Nancy Johnson	R	CT-06	January 3, 1983	3rd term	
298	Marcy Kaptur	D	OH-09	January 3, 1983	3rd term	
299	John Kasich	R	OH-12	January 3, 1983	3rd term	
300	Joseph P. Kolter	D	PA-04	January 3, 1983	3rd term	
301	Peter H. Kostmayer	D	PA-08	January 3, 1983; Previous service, 1977–1981.	5th term*	
302	Richard H. Lehman	D	CA-18	January 3, 1983	3rd term	
303	Mel Levine	D	CA-27	January 3, 1983	3rd term	
304	Sander Levin	D	MI-17	January 3, 1983	3rd term	
305	Tom Lewis	R	FL-12	January 3, 1983	3rd term	
306	Bill Lipinski	D	IL-05	January 3, 1983	3rd term	
307	Buddy MacKay	D	FL-06	January 3, 1983	3rd term	Left the House in 1989.
308	Connie Mack III	R	FL-13	January 3, 1983	3rd term	Left the House in 1989.
309	Al McCandless	R	CA-37	January 3, 1983	3rd term	
310	Frank McCloskey	D	IN-08	January 3, 1983	3rd term	
311	Alan Mollohan	D	WV-01	January 3, 1983	3rd term	
312	Jim Moody	D	WI-05	January 3, 1983	3rd term	
313	Bruce Morrison	D	CT-03	January 3, 1983	3rd term	
314	Robert J. Mrazek	D	NY-03	January 3, 1983	3rd term	
315	Howard C. Nielson	R	UT-03	January 3, 1983	3rd term	
316	Jim Olin	D	VA-06	January 3, 1983	3rd term	
317	Solomon Ortiz	D	TX-27	January 3, 1983	3rd term	
318	Major Owens	D	NY-12	January 3, 1983	3rd term	
319	Ron Packard	R	CA-43	January 3, 1983	3rd term	
320	Tim Penny	D	MN-01	January 3, 1983	3rd term	
321	Richard Ray	D	GA-03	January 3, 1983	3rd term	
322	Bill Richardson	D	NM-03	January 3, 1983	3rd term	
323	Tom Ridge	R	PA-21	January 3, 1983	3rd term	
324	James Rowland	D	GA-08	January 3, 1983	3rd term	
325	Gerry Sikorski	D	MN-06	January 3, 1983	3rd term	
326	Norman Sisisky	D	VA-04	January 3, 1983	3rd term	
327	Jim Slattery	D	KS-02	January 3, 1983	3rd term	
328	Lawrence J. Smith	D	FL-16	January 3, 1983	3rd term	
329	Robert Smith	R	OR-02	January 3, 1983	3rd term	
330	John Spratt	D	SC-05	January 3, 1983	3rd term	
331	Harley O. Staggers Jr.	D	WV-02	January 3, 1983	3rd term	
332	Don Sundquist	R	TN-07	January 3, 1983	3rd term	
333	Robin Tallon	D	SC-06	January 3, 1983	3rd term	
334	Lindsay Thomas	D	GA-01	January 3, 1983	3rd term	
335	Robert Torricelli	D	NJ-09	January 3, 1983	3rd term	
336	Esteban Edward Torres	D	CA-34	January 3, 1983	3rd term	
337	Ed Towns	D	NY-11	January 3, 1983	3rd term	
338	Tim Valentine	D	NC-02	January 3, 1983	3rd term	
339	Barbara Vucanovich	R	NV-02	January 3, 1983	3rd term	
340	Alan Wheat	D	MO-05	January 3, 1983	3rd term	
341	Bob Wise	D	WV-03	January 3, 1983	3rd term	
342	Gary Ackerman	D	NY-07	March 1, 1983	3rd term	
343	Daniel Schaefer	R	CO-06	March 29, 1983	3rd term	
344	Sala Burton	D	CA-05	June 21, 1983	3rd term	Died on February 1, 1987.
345	Charles Hayes	D	IL-01	August 23, 1983	3rd term	
346	George Darden	D	GA-07	November 8, 1983	3rd term	
347	Jerry Kleczka	D	WI-04	April 3, 1984	3rd term	
348	Carl C. Perkins	D	KY-07	November 6, 1984	3rd term	
349	Jim Saxton	R	NJ-13	November 6, 1984	3rd term	
350	Dick Armey	R	TX-26	January 3, 1985	2nd term	
351	Chester G. Atkins	D	MA-05	January 3, 1985	2nd term	
352	Joe Barton	R	TX-06	January 3, 1985	2nd term	
353	Helen Bentley	R	MD-02	January 3, 1985	2nd term	
354	Terry L. Bruce	D	IL-19	January 3, 1985	2nd term	
355	Beau Boulter	R	TX-13	January 3, 1985	2nd term	Left the House in 1989.
356	Albert Bustamante	D	TX-23	January 3, 1985	2nd term	
357	Sonny Callahan	R	AL-01	January 3, 1985	2nd term	
358	Howard Coble	R	NC-06	January 3, 1985	2nd term	
359	Larry Combest	R	TX-19	January 3, 1985	2nd term	
360	Tom DeLay	R	TX-22	January 3, 1985	2nd term	
361	Joseph J. DioGuardi	R	NY-20	January 3, 1985	2nd term	Left the House in 1989.
362	Bob Dornan	R	CA-38	January 3, 1985; Previous service, 1977–1983.	5th term*	
363	Harris Fawell	R	IL-13	January 3, 1985	2nd term	
364	Dean Gallo	R	NJ-11	January 3, 1985	2nd term	
365	Bart Gordon	D	TN-06	January 3, 1985	2nd term	
366	Kenneth J. Gray	D	IL-22	January 3, 1985; Previous service, 1955–1974.	12th term*	Left the House in 1989.
367	Paul Henry	R	MI-05	January 3, 1985	2nd term	
368	Paul Kanjorski	D	PA-11	January 3, 1985	2nd term	
369	Jim Kolbe	R	AZ-05	January 3, 1985	2nd term	
370	Jim Lightfoot	R	IA-05	January 3, 1985	2nd term	
371	Thomas J. Manton	D	NY-09	January 3, 1985	2nd term	
372	Alex McMillan	R	NC-09	January 3, 1985	2nd term	
373	Jan Meyers	R	KS-03	January 3, 1985	2nd term	
374	John Miller	R	WA-01	January 3, 1985	2nd term	
375	Tommy F. Robinson	D	AR-02	January 3, 1985	2nd term	
376	John G. Rowland	R	CT-05	January 3, 1985	2nd term	
377	Bill Schuette	R	MI-10	January 3, 1985	2nd term	
378	D. French Slaughter Jr.	R	VA-07	January 3, 1985	2nd term	
379	Bob Smith	R	NH-01	January 3, 1985	2nd term	
380	Richard H. Stallings	D	ID-02	January 3, 1985	2nd term	
381	Mac Sweeney	R	TX-14	January 3, 1985	2nd term	Left the House in 1989.
382	Pat Swindall	R	GA-04	January 3, 1985	2nd term	Left the House in 1989.
383	James Traficant	D	OH-17	January 3, 1985	2nd term	
384	Peter Visclosky	D	IN-01	January 3, 1985	2nd term	
385	Jim Chapman	D	TX-01	August 3, 1985	2nd term	
386	Cass Ballenger	R	NC-10	November 4, 1986	2nd term	
387	Richard Baker	R	LA-06	January 3, 1987	1st term	
388	James Bilbray	D	NV-01	January 3, 1987	1st term	
389	Joseph E. Brennan	D	ME-01	January 3, 1987	1st term	
390	Jack Buechner	R	MO-02	January 3, 1987	1st term	
391	Jim Bunning	R	KY-04	January 3, 1987	1st term	
392	Ben Nighthorse Campbell	D	CO-03	January 3, 1987	1st term	
393	Ben Cardin	D	MD-03	January 3, 1987	1st term	
394	James M. Clarke	D	NC-11	January 3, 1987; Previous service, 1983–1985.	2nd term*	
395	Jack Davis	R	IL-04	January 3, 1987	1st term	Left the House in 1989.
396	Peter DeFazio	D	OR-04	January 3, 1987	1st term	
397	Mike Espy	D	MS-02	January 3, 1987	1st term	
398	Floyd Flake	D	NY-06	January 3, 1987	1st term	
399	Elton Gallegly	R	CA-21	January 3, 1987	1st term	
400	Fred Grandy	R	IA-06	January 3, 1987	1st term	
401	Bill Grant	D	FL-02	January 3, 1987	1st term	
402	Claude Harris Jr.	D	AL-07	January 3, 1987	1st term	
403	Dennis Hastert	R	IL-14	January 3, 1987	1st term	
404	Jimmy Hayes	D	LA-07	January 3, 1987	1st term	
405	Joel Hefley	R	CO-05	January 3, 1987	1st term	
406	Wally Herger	R	CA-02	January 3, 1987	1st term	
407	George Hochbrueckner	D	NY-01	January 3, 1987	1st term	
408	Clyde C. Holloway	R	LA-08	January 3, 1987	1st term	
409	Amo Houghton	R	NY-34	January 3, 1987	1st term	
410	Jim Inhofe	R	OK-01	January 3, 1987	1st term	
411	Tim Johnson	D	SD	January 3, 1987	1st term	
412	Jim Jontz	D	IN-05	January 3, 1987	1st term	
413	Joseph Kennedy II	D	MA-08	January 3, 1987	1st term	
414	Ernie Konnyu	R	CA-12	January 3, 1987	1st term	Left the House in 1989.
415	Jon Kyl	R	AZ-04	January 3, 1987	1st term	
416	Martin Lancaster	D	NC-03	January 3, 1987	1st term	
417	John Lewis	D	GA-05	January 3, 1987	1st term	
418	Buz Lukens	R	OH-08	January 3, 1987; Previous service, 1967–1971.	3rd term*	
419	Charles Thomas McMillen	D	MD-04	January 3, 1987	1st term	
420	Kweisi Mfume	D	MD-07	January 3, 1987	1st term	
421	Connie Morella	R	MD-08	January 3, 1987	1st term	
422	David R. Nagle	D	IA-03	January 3, 1987	1st term	
423	Wayne Owens	D	UT-02	January 3, 1987; Previous service, 1973–1975.	2nd term*	
424	Liz J. Patterson	D	SC-04	January 3, 1987	1st term	
425	Owen Pickett	D	VA-02	January 3, 1987	1st term	
426	David Price	D	NC-04	January 3, 1987	1st term	
427	Arthur Ravenel	R	SC-01	January 3, 1987	1st term	
428	John J. Rhodes III	R	AZ-01	January 3, 1987	1st term	
429	Pat Saiki	R	HI-01	January 3, 1987	1st term	
430	Thomas Sawyer	D	OH-14	January 3, 1987	1st term	
431	David Skaggs	D	CO-02	January 3, 1987	1st term	
432	Louise Slaughter	D	NY-30	January 3, 1987	1st term	
433	Lamar Smith	R	TX-21	January 3, 1987	1st term	
434	Fred Upton	R	MI-04	January 3, 1987	1st term	
435	Curt Weldon	R	PA-07	January 3, 1987	1st term	
	Nancy Pelosi	D	CA-05	June 2, 1987	1st term	
	Chris Shays	R	CT-04	August 18, 1987	1st term	
	Bob Clement	D	TN-05	January 19, 1988	1st term	
	Jim McCrery	R	LA-04	April 16, 1988	1st term	
	Lewis Payne	D	VA-05	June 14, 1988	1st term	
	Jerry Costello	D	IL-21	August 9, 1988	1st term	
	Jimmy Duncan	R	TN-02	November 8, 1988	1st term	
	Frank Pallone	D	NJ-03	November 8, 1988	1st term	

== Delegates ==
Rank	Delegate	Party	District	Seniority date (Previous service, if any)	No.# of term(s)	Notes
1	Walter E. Fauntroy	D	DC	March 23, 1971	9th term	
2	Ron de Lugo	D	VI	January 3, 1981; Previous service, 1973–1979.	7th term*	
3	Fofó Iosefa Fiti Sunia	D	AS	January 3, 1981	4th term	
4	Jaime Fuster	D	PR	January 3, 1985	2nd term	
5	Vicente T. Blaz	R	GU	January 3, 1985	2nd term	

== See also ==
- 100th United States Congress
- List of United States congressional districts
- List of United States senators in the 100th Congress
