= List of United States representatives in the 99th Congress =

This is a complete list of United States representatives during the 99th United States Congress listed by seniority.

As an historical article, the districts and party affiliations listed reflect those during the 99th Congress (January 3, 1985 – January 3, 1987). Seats and party affiliations on similar lists for other congresses will be different for certain members.

Seniority depends on the date on which members were sworn into office. Since many members are sworn in on the same day, subsequent ranking is based on previous congressional service of the individual and then by alphabetical order by the last name of the representative.

Committee chairmanship in the House is often associated with seniority. However, party leadership is typically not associated with seniority.

Note: The "*" indicates that the representative/delegate may have served one or more non-consecutive terms while in the House of Representatives of the United States Congress.

== U.S. House seniority list ==
U.S. House seniority
Rank	Representative	Party	District	Seniority date	No.# of term(s)	Notes
1	Jamie Whitten	D	MS-01	November 4, 1941	23rd term	Dean of the House
2	Charles Melvin Price	D	IL-21	January 3, 1945	21st term	
3	Charles Edward Bennett	D	FL-03	January 3, 1949	19th term	
4	Peter W. Rodino	D	NJ-10	January 3, 1949	19th term	
5	Edward Boland	D	MA-02	January 3, 1953	17th term	
6	Jack Brooks	D	TX-09	January 3, 1953	17th term	
7	Tip O'Neill	D	MA-08	January 3, 1953	17th term	Speaker of the House; Left the House in 1987.
8	William Natcher	D	KY-02	August 1, 1953	17th term	
9	Dante Fascell	D	FL-19	January 3, 1955	16th term	
10	Jim Wright	D	TX-12	January 3, 1955	16th term	
11	John Dingell	D	MI-16	December 13, 1955	16th term	
12	William Broomfield	R	MI-18	January 3, 1957	15th term	
13	Robert Michel	R	IL-18	January 3, 1957	15th term	
14	Silvio O. Conte	R	MA-01	January 3, 1959	14th term	
15	Robert Kastenmeier	D	WI-02	January 3, 1959	14th term	
16	Del Latta	R	OH-05	January 3, 1959	14th term	
17	Dan Rostenkowski	D	IL-08	January 3, 1959	14th term	
18	Neal Smith	D	IA-04	January 3, 1959	14th term	
19	Samuel S. Stratton	D	NY-23	January 3, 1959	14th term	
20	Joseph Patrick Addabbo	D	NY-06	January 3, 1961	13th term	Died on April 10, 1986.
21	Fernand St. Germain	D	RI-01	January 3, 1961	13th term	
22	Mo Udall	D	AZ-02	May 2, 1961	13th term	
23	Henry Gonzalez	D	TX-20	November 4, 1961	13th term	
24	Jim Broyhill	R	NC-10	January 3, 1963	12th term	Resigned on July 14, 1986.
25	Don Edwards	D	CA-10	January 3, 1963	12th term	
26	Don Fuqua	D	FL-02	January 3, 1963	12th term	Left the House in 1987.
27	Sam Gibbons	D	FL-07	January 3, 1963	12th term	
28	Augustus F. Hawkins	D	CA-29	January 3, 1963	12th term	
29	Frank Horton	R	NY-29	January 3, 1963	12th term	
30	Joseph McDade	R	PA-10	January 3, 1963	12th term	
31	Claude Pepper	D	FL-18	January 3, 1963	12th term	
32	Jimmy Quillen	R	TN-01	January 3, 1963	12th term	
33	Edward R. Roybal	D	CA-25	January 3, 1963	12th term	
34	J. J. Pickle	D	TX-10	December 21, 1963	12th term	
35	Frank Annunzio	D	IL-11	January 3, 1965	11th term	
36	John Conyers	D	MI-01	January 3, 1965	11th term	
37	Bill Dickinson	R	AL-02	January 3, 1965	11th term	
38	John Duncan, Sr.	R	TN-02	January 3, 1965	11th term	
39	Tom Foley	D	WA-05	January 3, 1965	11th term	
40	William Ford	D	MI-15	January 3, 1965	11th term	
41	Kika De la Garza	D	TX-15	January 3, 1965	11th term	
42	Lee Hamilton	D	IN-09	January 3, 1965	11th term	
43	James J. Howard	D	NJ-03	January 3, 1965	11th term	
44	Sidney Yates	D	IL-09	January 3, 1965; Previous service, 1949–1963.	18th term*	
45	Walter B. Jones, Sr.	D	NC-01	February 5, 1966	11th term	
46	Guy Vander Jagt	R	MI-09	November 8, 1966	11th term	
47	Tom Bevill	D	AL-04	January 3, 1967	10th term	
48	John Paul Hammerschmidt	R	AR-03	January 3, 1967	10th term	
49	Clarence E. Miller	R	OH-10	January 3, 1967	10th term	
50	Sonny Montgomery	D	MS-03	January 3, 1967	10th term	
51	John Myers	R	IN-07	January 3, 1967	10th term	
52	Bill Nichols	D	AL-03	January 3, 1967	10th term	
53	Gene Snyder	R	KY-04	January 3, 1967; Previous service, 1963–1965.	11th term*	Left the House in 1987.
54	Chalmers Wylie	R	OH-15	January 3, 1967	10th term	
55	Joseph M. Gaydos	D	PA-20	November 5, 1968	10th term	
56	William Vollie Alexander Jr.	D	AR-01	January 3, 1969	9th term	
57	Glenn M. Anderson	D	CA-32	January 3, 1969	9th term	
58	Mario Biaggi	D	NY-19	January 3, 1969	9th term	
59	William V. Chappell Jr.	D	FL-04	January 3, 1969	9th term	Left the House in 1987.
60	Bill Clay	D	MO-01	January 3, 1969	9th term	
61	Lawrence Coughlin	R	PA-13	January 3, 1969	9th term	
62	Dan Daniel	D	VA-05	January 3, 1969	9th term	
63	Hamilton Fish	R	NY-21	January 3, 1969	9th term	
64	Manuel Lujan Jr.	R	NM-01	January 3, 1969	9th term	
65	Louis Stokes	D	OH-21	January 3, 1969	9th term	
66	G. William Whitehurst	R	VA-02	January 3, 1969	9th term	Left the House in 1987.
67	Gus Yatron	D	PA-06	January 3, 1969	9th term	
68	Ed Jones	D	TN-08	March 25, 1969	9th term	
69	Dave Obey	D	WI-07	April 1, 1969	9th term	
70	Robert A. Roe	D	NJ-08	November 4, 1969	9th term	
71	Phil Crane	R	IL-12	November 25, 1969	9th term	
72	William Reynolds Archer Jr.	R	TX-07	January 3, 1971	8th term	
73	Les Aspin	D	WI-01	January 3, 1971	8th term	
74	Ron Dellums	D	CA-08	January 3, 1971	8th term	
75	Bill Frenzel	R	MN-03	January 3, 1971	8th term	
76	Norman F. Lent	D	NY-04	January 3, 1971	8th term	
77	Elwood Hillis	R	IN-05	January 3, 1971	8th term	Left the House in 1987.
78	Jack Kemp	R	NY-31	January 3, 1971	8th term	
79	Romano Mazzoli	D	KY-03	January 3, 1971	8th term	
80	Stewart McKinney	R	CT-04	January 3, 1971	8th term	
81	Parren Mitchell	D	MD-07	January 3, 1971	8th term	Left the House in 1987.
82	Charles B. Rangel	D	NY-16	January 3, 1971	8th term	
83	John F. Seiberling	D	OH-14	January 3, 1971	8th term	Left the House in 1987.
84	Floyd Spence	R	SC-02	January 3, 1971	8th term	
85	Bill Young	R	FL-08	January 3, 1971	8th term	
86	John Breaux	D	LA-07	September 30, 1972	8th term	Left the House in 1987.
87	George Brown Jr.	D	CA-36	January 3, 1973; Previous service, 1963–1971.	11th term*	
88	Benjamin A. Gilman	R	NY-22	January 3, 1973	7th term	
89	Marjorie Holt	R	MD-04	January 3, 1973	7th term	Left the House in 1987.
90	James R. Jones	D	OK-01	January 3, 1973	7th term	Left the House in 1987.
91	William Lehman	D	FL-17	January 3, 1973	7th term	
92	Gillis W. Long	D	LA-08	January 3, 1973; Previous service, 1963–1965.	8th term*	Died on January 20, 1985.
93	Trent Lott	R	MS-05	January 3, 1973	7th term	
94	Edward Rell Madigan	R	IL-15	January 3, 1973	7th term	
95	Joe Moakley	D	MA-09	January 3, 1973	7th term	
96	Carlos Moorhead	R	CA-22	January 3, 1973	7th term	
97	George M. O'Brien	R	IL-04	January 3, 1973	7th term	Died on July 17, 1986.
98	Ralph Regula	R	OH-16	January 3, 1973	7th term	
99	Matthew John Rinaldo	R	NJ-07	January 3, 1973	7th term	
100	Charlie Rose	D	NC-07	January 3, 1973	7th term	
101	Patricia Schroeder	D	CO-01	January 3, 1973	7th term	
102	Bud Shuster	R	PA-09	January 3, 1973	7th term	
103	Pete Stark	D	CA-09	January 3, 1973	7th term	
104	Gerry Studds	D	MA-10	January 3, 1973	7th term	
105	Gene Taylor	R	MO-07	January 3, 1973	7th term	
106	Charles Wilson	D	TX-02	January 3, 1973	7th term	
107	Don Young	R	AK	March 6, 1973	7th term	
108	Lindy Boggs	D	LA-02	March 20, 1973	7th term	
109	Cardiss Collins	D	IL-07	June 5, 1973	7th term	
110	John Murtha	D	PA-12	February 5, 1974	7th term	
111	Robert J. Lagomarsino	R	CA-19	March 5, 1974	7th term	
112	J. Bob Traxler	D	MI-08	April 23, 1974	7th term	
113	Les AuCoin	D	OR-01	January 3, 1975	6th term	
114	Berkley Bedell	D	IA-06	January 3, 1975	6th term	Left the House in 1987.
115	Don Bonker	D	WA-03	January 3, 1975	6th term	
116	Butler Derrick	D	SC-03	January 3, 1975	6th term	
117	Thomas Downey	D	NY-02	January 3, 1975	6th term	
118	Joseph D. Early	D	MA-03	January 3, 1975	6th term	
119	Robert W. Edgar	D	PA-07	January 3, 1975	6th term	Left the House in 1987.
120	Glenn English	D	OK-06	January 3, 1975	6th term	
121	James Florio	D	NJ-01	January 3, 1975	6th term	
122	Harold Ford	D	TN-09	January 3, 1975	6th term	
123	Bill Goodling	R	PA-19	January 3, 1975	6th term	
124	Bill Gradison	R	OH-02	January 3, 1975	6th term	
125	Bill Hefner	D	NC-08	January 3, 1975	6th term	
126	Carroll Hubbard	D	KY-01	January 3, 1975	6th term	
127	William Hughes	D	NJ-02	January 3, 1975	6th term	
128	Henry Hyde	R	IL-06	January 3, 1975	6th term	
129	Andrew Jacobs Jr.	D	IN-10	January 3, 1975; Previous service, 1965–1973.	10th term*	
130	Jim Jeffords	R	VT	January 3, 1975	6th term	
131	Tom Kindness	R	OH-08	January 3, 1975	6th term	Left the House in 1987.
132	John LaFalce	D	NY-32	January 3, 1975	6th term	
133	Marilyn Lloyd	D	TN-03	January 3, 1975	6th term	
134	Matthew F. McHugh	D	NY-28	January 3, 1975	6th term	
135	George Miller	D	CA-07	January 3, 1975	6th term	
136	Norman Mineta	D	CA-13	January 3, 1975	6th term	
137	Henson Moore	R	LA-06	January 3, 1975	6th term	Left the House in 1987.
138	Stephen Neal	D	NC-05	January 3, 1975	6th term	
139	Henry J. Nowak	D	NY-33	January 3, 1975	6th term	
140	Jim Oberstar	D	MN-08	January 3, 1975	6th term	
141	Marty Russo	D	IL-03	January 3, 1975	6th term	
142	James H. Scheuer	D	NY-08	January 3, 1975; Previous service, 1965–1973.	10th term*	
143	Richard T. Schulze	R	PA-05	January 3, 1975	6th term	
144	Philip Sharp	D	IN-02	January 3, 1975	6th term	
145	Virginia D. Smith	R	NE-03	January 3, 1975	6th term	
146	Stephen J. Solarz	D	NY-13	January 3, 1975	6th term	
147	Jim Weaver	D	OR-04	January 3, 1975	6th term	Left the House in 1987.
148	Henry Waxman	D	CA-24	January 3, 1975	6th term	
149	Tim Wirth	D	CO-02	January 3, 1975	6th term	Left the House in 1987.
150	Stan Lundine	D	NY-34	March 2, 1976	6th term	Resigned on December 31, 1986.
151	Sam B. Hall Jr.	D	TX-01	June 19, 1976	6th term	Resigned on May 27, 1985.
152	Earl Thomas Coleman	R	MO-06	November 2, 1976	6th term	
153	Ed Markey	D	MA-07	November 2, 1976	6th term	
154	Daniel Akaka	D	HI-02	January 3, 1977	5th term	
155	Douglas Applegate	D	OH-18	January 3, 1977	5th term	
156	Robert Badham	R	CA-40	January 3, 1977	5th term	
157	Doug Barnard Jr.	D	GA-10	January 3, 1977	5th term	
158	Anthony C. Beilenson	D	CA-23	January 3, 1977	5th term	
159	David Bonior	D	MI-12	January 3, 1977	5th term	
160	Norm Dicks	D	WA-06	January 3, 1977	5th term	
161	Mickey Edwards	R	OK-05	January 3, 1977	5th term	
162	Ronnie Flippo	D	AL-05	January 3, 1977	5th term	
163	Dick Gephardt	D	MO-03	January 3, 1977	5th term	
164	Dan Glickman	D	KS-04	January 3, 1977	5th term	
165	Cecil Heftel	D	HI-01	January 3, 1977	5th term	Resigned on July 11, 1986.
166	Jerry Huckaby	D	LA-05	January 3, 1977	5th term	
167	Andy Ireland	R	FL-10	January 3, 1977	5th term	
168	Ed Jenkins	D	GA-09	January 3, 1977	5th term	
169	Dale Kildee	D	MI-07	January 3, 1977	5th term	
170	Jim Leach	R	IA-01	January 3, 1977	5th term	
171	Tom Luken	D	OH-01	January 3, 1977; Previous service, 1974–1975.	6th term*	
172	Ron Marlenee	R	MT-02	January 3, 1977	5th term	
173	Barbara Mikulski	D	MD-03	January 3, 1977	5th term	Left the House in 1987.
174	Austin Murphy	D	PA-22	January 3, 1977	5th term	
175	Mary Rose Oakar	D	OH-20	January 3, 1977	5th term	
176	Leon Panetta	D	CA-16	January 3, 1977	5th term	
177	Donald J. Pease	D	OH-13	January 3, 1977	5th term	
178	Carl Pursell	R	MI-02	January 3, 1977	5th term	
179	Nick Rahall	D	WV-04	January 3, 1977	5th term	
180	Eldon Rudd	R	AZ-04	January 3, 1977	5th term	Left the House in 1987.
181	Ike Skelton	D	MO-04	January 3, 1977	5th term	
182	Bob Stump	R	AZ-03	January 3, 1977	5th term	
183	Bruce Vento	D	MN-04	January 3, 1977	5th term	
184	Harold Volkmer	D	MO-09	January 3, 1977	5th term	
185	Doug Walgren	D	PA-18	January 3, 1977	5th term	
186	Robert Walker	R	PA-16	January 3, 1977	5th term	
187	Wes Watkins	D	OK-03	January 3, 1977	5th term	
188	Theodore S. Weiss	D	NY-17	January 3, 1977	5th term	
189	Charles Whitley	D	NC-03	January 3, 1977	5th term	Resigned on December 31, 1986.
190	Robert A. Young	D	MO-02	January 3, 1977	5th term	Left the House in 1987.
191	Arlan Stangeland	R	MN-07	February 22, 1977	5th term	
192	Wyche Fowler	D	GA-05	April 6, 1977	5th term	Left the House in 1987.
193	Bob Livingston	R	LA-01	August 27, 1977	5th term	
194	S. William Green	R	NY-15	February 14, 1978	5th term	
195	Robert García	D	NY-18	February 21, 1978	5th term	
196	Beryl Anthony Jr.	D	AR-04	January 3, 1979	4th term	
197	Michael D. Barnes	D	MD-08	January 3, 1979	4th term	Left the House in 1987.
198	Doug Bereuter	R	NE-01	January 3, 1979	4th term	
199	Bill Boner	D	TN-05	January 3, 1979	4th term	
200	Beverly Byron	D	MD-06	January 3, 1979	4th term	
201	Carroll A. Campbell Jr.	R	SC-04	January 3, 1979	4th term	Left the House in 1987.
202	William Carney	R	NY-01	January 3, 1979	4th term	Left the House in 1987.
203	Dick Cheney	R	WY	January 3, 1979	4th term	
204	William F. Clinger Jr.	R	PA-23	January 3, 1979	4th term	
205	Tony Coelho	D	CA-15	January 3, 1979	4th term	
206	Jim Courter	R	NJ-12	January 3, 1979	4th term	
207	William E. Dannemeyer	R	CA-39	January 3, 1979	4th term	
208	Thomas Daschle	D	SD	January 3, 1979	4th term	Left the House in 1987.
209	Robert William Davis	R	MI-11	January 3, 1979	4th term	
210	Julian C. Dixon	D	CA-28	January 3, 1979	4th term	
211	Brian J. Donnelly	D	MA-11	January 3, 1979	4th term	
212	Vic Fazio	D	CA-04	January 3, 1979	4th term	
213	Martin Frost	D	TX-24	January 3, 1979	4th term	
214	Newt Gingrich	R	GA-06	January 3, 1979	4th term	
215	William H. Gray	D	PA-02	January 3, 1979	4th term	
216	Frank Joseph Guarini	D	NJ-14	January 3, 1979	4th term	
217	Larry J. Hopkins	R	KY-06	January 3, 1979	4th term	
218	Tony Hall	D	OH-03	January 3, 1979	4th term	
219	Earl Dewitt Hutto	D	FL-01	January 3, 1979	4th term	
220	Ken Kramer	R	CO-05	January 3, 1979	4th term	Left the House in 1987.
221	Marvin Leath	D	TX-11	January 3, 1979	4th term	
222	Mickey Leland	D	TX-18	January 3, 1979	4th term	
223	Jerry Lewis	R	CA-35	January 3, 1979	4th term	
224	Tom Loeffler	R	TX-21	January 3, 1979	4th term	Left the House in 1987.
225	Mike Lowry	D	WA-07	January 3, 1979	4th term	
226	Dan Lungren	R	CA-42	January 3, 1979	4th term	
227	Bob Matsui	D	CA-03	January 3, 1979	4th term	
228	Nicholas Mavroules	D	MA-06	January 3, 1979	4th term	
229	Dan Mica	D	FL-14	January 3, 1979	4th term	
230	Bill Nelson	D	FL-11	January 3, 1979	4th term	
231	Chip Pashayan	R	CA-17	January 3, 1979	4th term	
232	Donald L. Ritter	R	PA-15	January 3, 1979	4th term	
233	Toby Roth	R	WI-08	January 3, 1979	4th term	
234	Martin Olav Sabo	D	MN-05	January 3, 1979	4th term	
235	James Sensenbrenner	R	WI-09	January 3, 1979	4th term	
236	Richard Shelby	D	AL-07	January 3, 1979	4th term	Left the House in 1987.
237	Norman D. Shumway	R	CA-14	January 3, 1979	4th term	
238	Olympia Snowe	R	ME-02	January 3, 1979	4th term	
239	Gerald Solomon	R	NY-24	January 3, 1979	4th term	
240	Charles Stenholm	D	TX-17	January 3, 1979	4th term	
241	Al Swift	D	WA-02	January 3, 1979	4th term	
242	Mike Synar	D	OK-02	January 3, 1979	4th term	
243	Tom Tauke	R	IA-02	January 3, 1979	4th term	
244	Bill Thomas	R	CA-20	January 3, 1979	4th term	
245	Bob Whittaker	R	KS-05	January 3, 1979	4th term	
246	Pat Williams	D	MT-01	January 3, 1979	4th term	
247	Howard Wolpe	D	MI-03	January 3, 1979	4th term	
248	Tom Petri	R	WI-06	April 3, 1979	4th term	
249	John Porter	R	IL-10	January 22, 1980	4th term	
250	Billy Tauzin	D	LA-03	May 22, 1980	4th term	
251	George Crockett Jr.	D	MI-13	November 4, 1980	4th term	
252	Thomas J. Bliley Jr.	R	VA-03	January 3, 1981	3rd term	
253	Hank Brown	R	CO-04	January 3, 1981	3rd term	
254	Eugene A. Chappie	R	CA-02	January 3, 1981	3rd term	Left the House in 1987.
255	Dan Coats	R	IN-04	January 3, 1981	3rd term	
256	William Coyne	D	PA-14	January 3, 1981	3rd term	
257	Larry Craig	R	ID-01	January 3, 1981	3rd term	
258	Hal Daub	R	NE-02	January 3, 1981	3rd term	
259	David Dreier	R	CA-33	January 3, 1981	3rd term	
260	Byron Dorgan	D	ND	January 3, 1981	3rd term	
261	Mervyn M. Dymally	D	CA-31	January 3, 1981	3rd term	
262	Roy Dyson	D	MD-01	January 3, 1981	3rd term	
263	Bernard J. Dwyer	D	NJ-06	January 3, 1981	3rd term	
264	Dennis E. Eckart	D	OH-11	January 3, 1981	3rd term	
265	Bill Emerson	R	MO-08	January 3, 1981	3rd term	
266	T. Cooper Evans	R	IA-03	January 3, 1981	3rd term	Left the House in 1987.
267	Bobbi Fiedler	R	CA-21	January 3, 1981	3rd term	Left the House in 1987.
268	Jack Fields	R	TX-08	January 3, 1981	3rd term	
269	Tom Foglietta	D	PA-01	January 3, 1981	3rd term	
270	Barney Frank	D	MA-04	January 3, 1981	3rd term	
271	Sam Gejdenson	D	CT-02	January 3, 1981	3rd term	
272	Judd Gregg	R	NH-02	January 3, 1981	3rd term	
273	Steve Gunderson	R	WI-03	January 3, 1981	3rd term	
274	Ralph Hall	D	TX-04	January 3, 1981	3rd term	
275	James Hansen	R	UT-01	January 3, 1981	3rd term	
276	Thomas F. Hartnett	R	SC-01	January 3, 1981	3rd term	Left the House in 1987.
277	Charles Floyd Hatcher	D	GA-02	January 3, 1981	3rd term	
278	Dennis M. Hertel	D	MI-14	January 3, 1981	3rd term	
279	John P. Hiler	R	IN-03	January 3, 1981	3rd term	
280	Duncan Hunter	R	CA-45	January 3, 1981	3rd term	
281	Tom Lantos	D	CA-11	January 3, 1981	3rd term	
282	Bill Lowery	R	CA-41	January 3, 1981	3rd term	
283	David O'Brien Martin	R	NY-26	January 3, 1981	3rd term	
284	Lynn Morley Martin	R	IL-16	January 3, 1981	3rd term	
285	Bill McCollum	R	FL-05	January 3, 1981	3rd term	
286	Dave McCurdy	D	OK-04	January 3, 1981	3rd term	
287	Bob McEwen	R	OH-06	January 3, 1981	3rd term	
288	Raymond J. McGrath	R	NY-05	January 3, 1981	3rd term	
289	Guy Molinari	R	NY-14	January 3, 1981	3rd term	
290	Sid Morrison	R	WA-04	January 3, 1981	3rd term	
291	Stanford Parris	R	VA-08	January 3, 1981; Previous service, 1973–1975.	4th term*	
292	Pat Roberts	R	KS-01	January 3, 1981	3rd term	
293	Buddy Roemer	D	LA-04	January 3, 1981	3rd term	
294	Hal Rogers	R	KY-05	January 3, 1981	3rd term	
295	Marge Roukema	R	NJ-05	January 3, 1981	3rd term	
296	Gus Savage	D	IL-02	January 3, 1981	3rd term	
297	Chuck Schumer	D	NY-10	January 3, 1981	3rd term	
298	Claudine Schneider	R	RI-02	January 3, 1981	3rd term	
299	E. Clay Shaw Jr.	R	FL-15	January 3, 1981	3rd term	
300	Joe Skeen	R	NM-02	January 3, 1981	3rd term	
301	Christopher Smith	R	NJ-04	January 3, 1981	3rd term	
302	Denny Smith	R	OR-05	January 3, 1981	3rd term	
303	Vin Weber	R	MN-02	January 3, 1981	3rd term	
304	George C. Wortley	R	NY-27	January 3, 1981	3rd term	
305	Ron Wyden	D	OR-03	January 3, 1981	3rd term	
306	Frank Wolf	R	VA-10	January 3, 1981	3rd term	
307	Mark D. Siljander	R	MI-04	April 21, 1981	3rd term	Left the House in 1987.
308	Steny H. Hoyer	D	MD-05	May 19, 1981	3rd term	
309	Mike Oxley	R	OH-04	June 25, 1981	3rd term	
310	Wayne Dowdy	D	MS-04	July 7, 1981	3rd term	
311	Barbara B. Kennelly	D	CT-01	January 12, 1982	3rd term	
312	Matthew G. Martinez	D	CA-30	July 13, 1982	3rd term	
313	Michael A. Andrews	D	TX-25	January 3, 1983	2nd term	
314	Steve Bartlett	R	TX-03	January 3, 1983	2nd term	
315	Herbert Bateman	R	VA-01	January 3, 1983	2nd term	
316	Jim Bates	D	CA-44	January 3, 1983	2nd term	
317	Howard Berman	D	CA-26	January 3, 1983	2nd term	
318	Michael Bilirakis	R	FL-09	January 3, 1983	2nd term	
319	Sherwood Boehlert	R	NY-25	January 3, 1983	2nd term	
320	Robert A. Borski, Jr.	D	PA-03	January 3, 1983	2nd term	
321	Douglas H. Bosco	D	CA-01	January 3, 1983	2nd term	
322	Rick Boucher	D	VA-09	January 3, 1983	2nd term	
323	Barbara Boxer	D	CA-06	January 3, 1983	2nd term	
324	John Bryant	D	TX-05	January 3, 1983	2nd term	
325	Dan Burton	R	IN-06	January 3, 1983	2nd term	
326	Thomas Carper	D	DE	January 3, 1983	2nd term	
327	Bob Carr	D	MI-06	January 3, 1983; Previous service, 1975–1981.	5th term*	
328	Rod Chandler	R	WA-08	January 3, 1983	2nd term	
329	Ron Coleman	D	TX-16	January 3, 1983	2nd term	
330	Jim Cooper	D	TN-04	January 3, 1983	2nd term	
331	Mike DeWine	R	OH-07	January 3, 1983	2nd term	
332	Richard Durbin	D	IL-20	January 3, 1983	2nd term	
333	Ben Erdreich	D	AL-06	January 3, 1983	2nd term	
334	Lane Evans	D	IL-17	January 3, 1983	2nd term	
335	Ed Feighan	D	OH-19	January 3, 1983	2nd term	
336	Webb Franklin	R	MS-02	January 3, 1983	2nd term	Left the House in 1987.
337	George Gekas	R	PA-17	January 3, 1983	2nd term	
338	Nancy Johnson	R	CT-06	January 3, 1983	2nd term	
339	Marcy Kaptur	D	OH-09	January 3, 1983	2nd term	
340	John Kasich	R	OH-12	January 3, 1983	2nd term	
341	Joseph P. Kolter	D	PA-04	January 3, 1983	2nd term	
342	Peter H. Kostmayer	D	PA-08	January 3, 1983; Previous service, 1977–1981.	4th term*	
343	Richard H. Lehman	D	CA-18	January 3, 1983	2nd term	
344	Mel Levine	D	CA-27	January 3, 1983	2nd term	
345	Sander Levin	D	MI-17	January 3, 1983	2nd term	
346	Tom Lewis	R	FL-12	January 3, 1983	2nd term	
347	Bill Lipinski	D	IL-05	January 3, 1983	2nd term	
348	Buddy MacKay	D	FL-06	January 3, 1983	2nd term	
349	Connie Mack III	R	FL-13	January 3, 1983	2nd term	
350	John McCain	R	AZ-01	January 3, 1983	2nd term	Left the House in 1987.
351	Al McCandless	R	CA-37	January 3, 1983	2nd term	
352	John R. McKernan Jr.	R	ME-01	January 3, 1983	2nd term	Left the House in 1987.
353	Frank McCloskey	D	IN-08	January 3, 1983	2nd term	
354	Alan Mollohan	D	WV-01	January 3, 1983	2nd term	
355	Jim Moody	D	WI-05	January 3, 1983	2nd term	
356	Bruce Morrison	D	CT-03	January 3, 1983	2nd term	
357	Robert J. Mrazek	D	NY-03	January 3, 1983	2nd term	
358	Howard C. Nielson	R	UT-03	January 3, 1983	2nd term	
359	Jim Olin	D	VA-06	January 3, 1983	2nd term	
360	Solomon Ortiz	D	TX-27	January 3, 1983	2nd term	
361	Major Owens	D	NY-12	January 3, 1983	2nd term	
362	Ron Packard	R	CA-43	January 3, 1983	2nd term	
363	Tim Penny	D	MN-01	January 3, 1983	2nd term	
364	Richard Ray	D	GA-03	January 3, 1983	2nd term	
365	Harry Reid	D	NV-01	January 3, 1983	2nd term	Left the House in 1987.
366	Bill Richardson	D	NM-03	January 3, 1983	2nd term	
367	Tom Ridge	R	PA-21	January 3, 1983	2nd term	
368	James Rowland	D	GA-08	January 3, 1983	2nd term	
369	Gerry Sikorski	D	MN-06	January 3, 1983	2nd term	
370	Norman Sisisky	D	VA-04	January 3, 1983	2nd term	
371	Jim Slattery	D	KS-02	January 3, 1983	2nd term	
372	Lawrence J. Smith	D	FL-16	January 3, 1983	2nd term	
373	Robert Smith	R	OR-02	January 3, 1983	2nd term	
374	John Spratt	D	SC-05	January 3, 1983	2nd term	
375	Harley O. Staggers Jr.	D	WV-02	January 3, 1983	2nd term	
376	Don Sundquist	R	TN-07	January 3, 1983	2nd term	
377	Robin Tallon	D	SC-06	January 3, 1983	2nd term	
378	Esteban Edward Torres	D	CA-34	January 3, 1983	2nd term	
379	Robert Torricelli	D	NJ-09	January 3, 1983	2nd term	
380	Lindsay Thomas	D	GA-01	January 3, 1983	2nd term	
381	Ed Towns	D	NY-11	January 3, 1983	2nd term	
382	Tim Valentine	D	NC-02	January 3, 1983	2nd term	
383	Barbara Vucanovich	R	NV-02	January 3, 1983	2nd term	
384	Alan Wheat	D	MO-05	January 3, 1983	2nd term	
385	Bob Wise	D	WV-03	January 3, 1983	2nd term	
386	Ed Zschau	R	CA-12	January 3, 1983	2nd term	Left the House in 1987.
387	Gary Ackerman	D	NY-07	March 1, 1983	2nd term	
388	Daniel Schaefer	R	CO-06	March 29, 1983	2nd term	
389	Sala Burton	D	CA-05	June 21, 1983	2nd term	
390	Charles Hayes	D	IL-01	August 23, 1983	2nd term	
391	George Darden	D	GA-07	November 8, 1983	2nd term	
392	Jerry Kleczka	D	WI-04	April 3, 1984	2nd term	
393	Carl C. Perkins	D	KY-07	November 6, 1984	2nd term	
394	Jim Saxton	R	NJ-13	November 6, 1984	2nd term	
395	Dick Armey	R	TX-26	January 3, 1985	1st term	
396	Chester G. Atkins	D	MA-05	January 3, 1985	1st term	
397	Joe Barton	R	TX-06	January 3, 1985	1st term	
398	Helen Bentley	R	MD-02	January 3, 1985	1st term	
399	Terry L. Bruce	D	IL-19	January 3, 1985	1st term	
400	Beau Boulter	R	TX-13	January 3, 1985	1st term	
401	Albert Bustamante	D	TX-23	January 3, 1985	1st term	
402	Sonny Callahan	R	AL-01	January 3, 1985	1st term	
403	Bill Cobey	R	NC-04	January 3, 1985	1st term	Left the House in 1987.
404	Howard Coble	R	NC-06	January 3, 1985	1st term	
405	Larry Combest	R	TX-19	January 3, 1985	1st term	
406	Tom DeLay	R	TX-22	January 3, 1985	1st term	
407	Joseph J. DioGuardi	R	NY-20	January 3, 1985	1st term	
408	Bob Dornan	R	CA-38	January 3, 1985; Previous service, 1977–1983.	4th term*	
409	Fred J. Eckert	R	NY-30	January 3, 1985	1st term	Left the House in 1987.
410	Harris Fawell	R	IL-13	January 3, 1985	1st term	
411	Dean Gallo	R	NJ-11	January 3, 1985	1st term	
412	Bart Gordon	D	TN-06	January 3, 1985	1st term	
413	Kenneth J. Gray	D	IL-22	January 3, 1985; Previous service, 1955–1974.	11th term*	
414	John E. Grotberg	R	IL-14	January 3, 1985	1st term	Died on November 15, 1986.
415	Bill Hendon	R	NC-11	January 3, 1985; Previous service, 1981–1983.	2nd term*	Left the House in 1987.
416	Paul Henry	R	MI-05	January 3, 1985	1st term	
417	Paul Kanjorski	D	PA-11	January 3, 1985	1st term	
418	Jim Kolbe	R	AZ-05	January 3, 1985	1st term	
419	Jim Lightfoot	R	IA-05	January 3, 1985	1st term	
420	Thomas J. Manton	D	NY-09	January 3, 1985	1st term	
421	Alex McMillan	R	NC-09	January 3, 1985	1st term	
422	Jan Meyers	R	KS-03	January 3, 1985	1st term	
423	John Miller	R	WA-01	January 3, 1985	1st term	
424	David S. Monson	R	UT-02	January 3, 1985	1st term	Left the House in 1987.
425	Tommy F. Robinson	D	AR-02	January 3, 1985	1st term	
426	John G. Rowland	R	CT-05	January 3, 1985	1st term	
427	Bill Schuette	R	MI-10	January 3, 1985	1st term	
428	D. French Slaughter Jr.	R	VA-07	January 3, 1985	1st term	
429	Bob Smith	R	NH-01	January 3, 1985	1st term	
430	Richard H. Stallings	D	ID-02	January 3, 1985	1st term	
431	Michael L. Strang	R	CO-03	January 3, 1985	1st term	Left the House in 1987.
432	Mac Sweeney	R	TX-14	January 3, 1985	1st term	
433	Pat Swindall	D	GA-04	January 3, 1985	1st term	
434	James Traficant	D	OH-17	January 3, 1985	1st term	
435	Peter Visclosky	D	IN-01	January 3, 1985	1st term	
	Catherine Small Long	D	LA-08	March 30, 1985	1st term	Left the House in 1987.
	Jim Chapman	D	TX-01	August 3, 1985	1st term	
	Alton R. Waldon Jr.	D	NY-06	June 10, 1986	1st term	Left the House in 1987.
	Neil Abercrombie	D	HI-01	September 20, 1986	1st term	Left the House in 1987.
	Cass Ballenger	R	NC-10	November 4, 1986	1st term	

== Delegates ==
Rank	Delegate	Party	District	Seniority date	Term #	Notes
1	Walter E. Fauntroy	D	DC	March 23, 1971	8th term	
2	Ron de Lugo	D	VI	January 3, 1981; Previous service, 1973–1979.	6th term*	
3	Fofó Iosefa Fiti Sunia	D	AS	January 3, 1981	3rd term	
4	Jaime Fuster	D	PR	January 3, 1985	1st term	
5	Vicente T. Blaz	R	GU	January 3, 1985	1st term	

== See also ==
- 99th United States Congress
- List of United States congressional districts
- List of United States senators in the 99th Congress
