= List of United States senators in the 100th Congress =

This is a complete list of United States senators during the 100th United States Congress listed by seniority from January 3, 1987, to January 3, 1989.

Order of service is based on the commencement of the senator's first term. Behind this is former service as a senator (only giving the senator seniority within their new incoming class), service as vice president, a House member, a cabinet secretary, or a governor of a state. The final factor is the population of the senator's state.

In this congress, Ernest Hollings (D-South Carolina) was the most senior junior senator and Daniel J. Evans (R-Washington) was the most junior senior senator.

Senators who were sworn in during the middle of the two-year congressional term (up until the last senator who was not sworn in early after winning the November 1988 election) are listed at the end of the list with no number.

== Terms of service ==
Class	Terms of service of senators that expired in years
Class 1	Terms of service of senators that expired in 1989 (AZ, CA, CT, DE, FL, HI, IN, MA, MD, ME, MI, MN, MO, MS, MT, ND, NE, NJ, NM, NV, NY, OH, PA, RI, TN, TX, UT, VA, VT, WA, WI, WV and WY.)
Class 2	Terms of service of senators that expired in 1991 (AK, AL, AR, CO, DE, GA, IA, ID, IL, KS, KY, LA, MA, ME, MI, MN, MS, MT, NE, NH, NJ, NM, NC, OK, OR, RI, SC, SD, TN, TX, VA, WV, and WY.)
Class 3	Terms of service of senators that expired in 1993 (AK, AL, AR, AZ, CA, CO, CT, FL, GA, HI, IA, ID, IL, IN, KS, KY, LA, MD, MO, NC, ND, NH, NV, NY, OH, OK, OR, PA, SC, SD, UT, VT, WA, and WI.)

== U.S. Senate seniority list ==
U.S. Senate seniority
Rank	Senator (party-state)	Seniority date	Other factors
1	John C. Stennis (D-MS)	November 17, 1947	
2	Strom Thurmond (R-SC)	November 7, 1956	
3	William Proxmire (D-WI)	August 28, 1957	
4	Robert Byrd (D-WV)	January 3, 1959	
5	Quentin Northrup Burdick (D-ND)	August 8, 1960	
6	Claiborne Pell (D-RI)	January 3, 1961	
7	Ted Kennedy (D-MA)	November 7, 1962	
8	Daniel Inouye (D-HI)	January 3, 1963	
9	Ernest Hollings (D-SC)	November 9, 1966	
10	Mark Hatfield (R-OR)	January 10, 1967	
11	Ted Stevens (R-AK)	December 24, 1968	
12	Bob Dole (R-KS)	January 3, 1969	Former representative
13	Alan Cranston (D-CA)	January 3, 1969	California 2nd in population (1960)
14	Bob Packwood (R-OR)	January 3, 1969	Oregon 32nd in population (1960)
15	Bill Roth (R-DE)	January 1, 1971	
16	Lloyd Bentsen (D-TX)	January 3, 1971	Former representative (6 years)
17	Lowell Weicker (R-CT)	January 3, 1971	Former representative (2 years)
18	Lawton Chiles (D-FL)	January 3, 1971	
19	Robert Stafford (R-VT)	September 16, 1971	
20	Sam Nunn (D-GA)	November 8, 1972	
21	Bennett Johnston Jr. (D-LA)	November 14, 1972	
22	James A. McClure (R-ID)	January 3, 1973	Former representative
23	Jesse Helms (R-NC)	January 3, 1973	North Carolina 12th in population (1970)
24	Pete Domenici (R-NM)	January 3, 1973	New Mexico 37th in population (1970)
25	Joe Biden (D-DE)	January 3, 1973	Delaware 46th in population (1970)
26	Jake Garn (R-UT)	December 21, 1974	
27	John Glenn (D-OH)	December 24, 1974	
28	Wendell H. Ford (D-KY)	December 28, 1974	
29	Dale Bumpers (D-AR)	January 3, 1975	Former governor
30	Patrick Leahy (D-VT)	January 3, 1975	
31	John Danforth (R-MO)	December 27, 1976	
32	Edward Zorinsky (D-NE)	December 28, 1976	
33	Howard Metzenbaum (D-OH)	December 29, 1976	Previously a senator
34	John Chafee (R-RI)	December 29, 1976	
35	Donald W. Riegle, Jr. (D-MI)	December 30, 1976	
36	Spark Matsunaga (D-HI)	January 3, 1977	Former representative (14 years)
37	John Melcher (D-MT)	January 3, 1977	Former representative (7 years, 7 months)
38	H. John Heinz III (R-PA)	January 3, 1977	Former representative (6 years)
39	Paul Sarbanes (D-MD)	January 3, 1977	Former representative (6 years)
40	Pat Moynihan (D-NY)	January 3, 1977	New York 2nd in population (1970)
41	Richard Lugar (R-IN)	January 3, 1977	Indiana 11th in population (1970)
42	Jim Sasser (D-TN)	January 3, 1977	Tennessee 17th in population (1970)
43	Dennis DeConcini (D-AZ)	January 3, 1977	Arizona 22nd in population (1970)
44	Orrin Hatch (R-UT)	January 3, 1977	Utah 36th in population (1970)
45	Malcolm Wallop (R-WY)	January 3, 1977	Wyoming 49th in population (1970)
46	David Durenberger (R-MN)	November 8, 1978	
47	Max Baucus (D-MT)	December 15, 1978	
48	Nancy Kassebaum Baker (R-KS)	December 23, 1978	
49	Thad Cochran (R-MS)	December 27, 1978	
50	Rudy Boschwitz (R-MN)	December 30, 1978	
51	Alan K. Simpson (R-WY)	January 1, 1979	
52	John Warner (R-VA)	January 2, 1979	
53	David Pryor (D-AR)	January 3, 1979	Former representative (6 years, 2 months)
54	William Cohen (R-ME)	January 3, 1979	Former representative (6 years)
55	William L. Armstrong (R-CO)	January 3, 1979	Former representative (4 years) - Colorado 30th in population (1970)
56	Larry Pressler (R-SD)	January 3, 1979	Former representative (4 years) - South Dakota 44th in population (1970)
57	David L. Boren (D-OK)	January 3, 1979	Former governor - Oklahoma 27th in population (1970)
58	J. James Exon (D-NE)	January 3, 1979	Former governor - Nebraska 35th in population (1970)
59	Carl Levin (D-MI)	January 3, 1979	Michigan 7th in population (1970)
60	Bill Bradley (D-NJ)	January 3, 1979	New Jersey 8th in population (1970)
61	Howell Heflin (D-AL)	January 3, 1979	Alabama 21st in population (1970)
62	Gordon J. Humphrey (R-NH)	January 3, 1979	New Hampshire 41st in population (1970)
63	George J. Mitchell (D-ME)	May 17, 1980	
64	Warren Rudman (R-NH)	December 31, 1980	
65	Steve Symms (R-ID)	January 3, 1981	Former representative (12 years)
66	Chris Dodd (D-CT)	January 3, 1981	Former representative (6 years) - Connecticut 24th in population (1970)
67	Chuck Grassley (R-IA)	January 3, 1981	Former representative (6 years) - Iowa 25th in population (1970)
68	Dan Quayle (R-IN)	January 3, 1981	Former representative (4 years) - Indiana 11th in population (1970)
69	Bob Kasten (R-WI)	January 3, 1981	Former representative (4 years) - Wisconsin 16th in population (1970)
70	Al D'Amato (R-NY)	January 3, 1981	New York 2nd in population (1970)
71	Arlen Specter (R-PA)	January 3, 1981	Pennsylvania 3rd in population (1970)
72	Alan J. Dixon (D-IL)	January 3, 1981	Illinois 5th in population (1970)
73	Don Nickles (R-OK)	January 3, 1981	Oklahoma 27th in population (1981)
74	Frank Murkowski (R-AK)	January 3, 1981	Alaska 50th in population (1981)
75	Frank Lautenberg (D-NJ)	December 27, 1982	
76	Paul Trible (R-VA)	January 3, 1983	Former representative
77	Pete Wilson (R-CA)	January 3, 1983	California 1st in population (1980)
78	Jeff Bingaman (D-NM)	January 3, 1983	New Mexico 37th in population (1980)
79	Chic Hecht (R-NV)	January 3, 1983	Nevada 43rd in population (1980)
80	Daniel J. Evans (R-WA)	September 12, 1983	
81	John Kerry (D-MA)	January 2, 1985	
82	Paul Simon (D-IL)	January 3, 1985	Former representative (10 years) - Illinois 5th in population (1980)
83	Tom Harkin (D-IA)	January 3, 1985	Former representative (10 years) - Iowa 27th in population (1980)
84	Al Gore (D-TN)	January 3, 1985	Former representative (8 years)
85	Phil Gramm (R-TX)	January 3, 1985	Former representative (6 years)
86	Mitch McConnell (R-KY)	January 3, 1985	
87	Jay Rockefeller (D-WV)	January 15, 1985	
88	Terry Sanford (D-NC)	November 5, 1986	
89	John Breaux (D-LA)	January 3, 1987	Former representative (14 years)
90	Brock Adams (D-WA)	January 3, 1987	Former representative (12 years) - Former cabinet secretary
91	Tim Wirth (D-CO)	January 3, 1987	Former representative (12 years)
92	Barbara Mikulski (D-MD)	January 3, 1987	Former representative (10 years)
93	Wyche Fowler (D-GA)	January 3, 1987	Former representative (9 years, 9 months)
94	Richard Shelby (D-AL)	January 3, 1987	Former representative (8 years) - Alabama 22nd in population (1980)
95	Tom Daschle (D-SD)	January 3, 1987	Former representative (8 years) - South Dakota 45th in population (1980)
96	John McCain (R-AZ)	January 3, 1987	Former representative (4 years) - Arizona 29th in population (1980)
97	Harry Reid (D-NV)	January 3, 1987	Former representative (4 years) - Nevada 43rd in population (1980)
98	Bob Graham (D-FL)	January 3, 1987	Former governor - Florida 7th in population (1980)
99	Kit Bond (R-MO)	January 3, 1987	Former governor - Missouri 15th in population (1980)
100	Kent Conrad (D-ND)	January 3, 1987	
	David Karnes (R-NE)	March 13, 1987	

The most senior senators by class were John C. Stennis (D-Mississippi) from Class 1, Strom Thurmond (R-South Carolina) from Class 2, and Daniel Inouye (D-Hawaii) from Class 3.

== See also ==
- 100th United States Congress
- List of United States representatives in the 100th Congress
