= List of United States senators in the 99th Congress =

This is a complete list of United States senators during the 99th United States Congress listed by seniority from January 3, 1985, to January 3, 1987.

Order of service is based on the commencement of the senator's first term. Behind this is former service as a senator (only giving the senator seniority within their new incoming class), service as vice president, a House member, a cabinet secretary, or a governor of a state. The final factor is the population of the senator's state.

Senators who were sworn in during the two-year congressional term (up until the last senator who was not sworn in early after winning the November 1986 election) are listed at the end of the list with no number.

The most senior junior senator was Ernest Hollings of South Carolina. The most junior senior senator was Slade Gorton of Washington.

== Terms of service ==
Class	Terms of service of senators that expired in years
Class 3	Terms of service of senators that expired in 1987 (AK, AL, AR, AZ, CA, CO, CT, FL, GA, HI, IA, ID, IL, IN, KS, KY, LA, MD, MO, NC, ND, NH, NV, NY, OH, OK, OR, PA, SC, SD, UT, VT, WA, and WI.)
Class 1	Terms of service of senators that expired in 1989 (AZ, CA, CT, DE, FL, HI, IN, MA, MD, ME, MI, MN, MO, MS, MT, ND, NE, NJ, NM, NV, NY, OH, PA, RI, TN, TX, UT, VA, VT, WA, WI, WV, and WY.)
Class 2	Terms of service of senators that expired in 1991 (AK, AL, AR, CO, DE, GA, IA, ID, IL, KS, KY, LA, MA, ME, MI, MN, MS, MT, NC, NE, NH, NJ, NM, OK, OR, RI, SC, SD, TN, TX, VA, WV, and WY.)

== U.S. Senate seniority list ==
U.S. Senate seniority
Rank	Senator (party-state)	Seniority date	Other factors
1	John C. Stennis (D-MS)	November 17, 1947	
2	Russell B. Long (D-LA)	December 31, 1948	
3	Strom Thurmond (R-SC)	November 7, 1956	
4	William Proxmire (D-WI)	August 28, 1957	
5	Robert Byrd (D-WV)	January 3, 1959	
6	Quentin Northrup Burdick (D-ND)	August 8, 1960	
7	Claiborne Pell (D-RI)	January 3, 1961	
8	Ted Kennedy (D-MA)	November 7, 1962	
9	Daniel Inouye (D-HI)	January 3, 1963	
10	Fritz Hollings (D-SC)	November 9, 1966	
11	Mark Hatfield (R-OR)	January 10, 1967	
12	Ted Stevens (R-AK)	December 24, 1968	
13	Thomas Eagleton (D-MO)	December 28, 1968	
14	Barry Goldwater (R-AZ)	January 3, 1969	Previously a senator
15	Charles Mathias (R-MD)	January 3, 1969	Former representative (8 years) - Maryland 21st in population (1960)
16	Bob Dole (R-KS)	January 3, 1969	Former representative (8 years) - Kansas 29th in population (1960)
17	Alan Cranston (D-CA)	January 3, 1969	California 2nd in population (1960)
18	Bob Packwood (R-OR)	January 3, 1969	Oregon 32nd in population (1960)
19	Bill Roth (R-DE)	January 1, 1971	
20	Lloyd Bentsen (D-TX)	January 3, 1971	Former representative (6 years)
21	Lowell Weicker (R-CT)	January 3, 1971	Former representative (2 years)
22	Lawton Chiles (D-FL)	January 3, 1971	
23	Robert Stafford (R-VT)	September 16, 1971	
24	Sam Nunn (D-GA)	November 8, 1972	
25	Bennett Johnston Jr. (D-LA)	November 14, 1972	
26	James A. McClure (R-ID)	January 3, 1973	Former representative
27	Jesse Helms (R-NC)	January 3, 1973	North Carolina 12th in population (1970)
28	Pete Domenici (R-NM)	January 3, 1973	New Mexico 37th in population (1970)
29	Joe Biden (D-DE)	January 3, 1973	Delaware 46th in population (1970)
30	Paul Laxalt (R-NV)	December 18, 1974	
31	Jake Garn (R-UT)	December 21, 1974	
32	John Glenn (D-OH)	December 24, 1974	
33	Wendell H. Ford (D-KY)	December 28, 1974	
34	Dale Bumpers (D-AR)	January 3, 1975	Former governor
35	Gary Hart (D-CO)	January 3, 1975	Colorado 30th in population (1970)
36	Patrick Leahy (D-VT)	January 3, 1975	Vermont 48th in population (1970)
37	John Danforth (R-MO)	December 27, 1976	
38	Edward Zorinsky (D-NE)	December 28, 1976	
39	Howard Metzenbaum (D-OH)	December 29, 1976	Previously a senator
40	John Chafee (R-RI)	December 29, 1976	
41	Donald W. Riegle, Jr. (D-MI)	December 30, 1976	
42	Spark Matsunaga (D-HI)	January 3, 1977	Former representative (14 years)
43	John Melcher (D-MT)	January 3, 1977	Former representative (7 years, 7 months)
44	H. John Heinz III (R-PA)	January 3, 1977	Former representative (6 years)
45	Paul Sarbanes (D-MD)	January 3, 1977	Former representative (6 years)
46	Daniel Patrick Moynihan (D-NY)	January 3, 1977	New York 2nd in population (1970)
47	Richard Lugar (R-IN)	January 3, 1977	Indiana 11th in population (1970)
48	Jim Sasser (D-TN)	January 3, 1977	Tennessee 17th in population (1970)
49	Dennis DeConcini (D-AZ)	January 3, 1977	Arizona 22nd in population (1970)
50	Orrin Hatch (R-UT)	January 3, 1977	Utah 36th in population (1970)
51	Malcolm Wallop (R-WY)	January 3, 1977	Wyoming 49th in population (1970)
52	David Durenberger (R-MN)	November 8, 1978	
53	Max Baucus (D-MT)	December 15, 1978	
54	Nancy Kassebaum (R-KS)	December 23, 1978	
55	Thad Cochran (R-MS)	December 27, 1978	
56	Rudy Boschwitz (R-MN)	December 30, 1978	
57	Alan K. Simpson (R-WY)	January 1, 1979	
58	John Warner (R-VA)	January 2, 1979	
59	David Pryor (D-AR)	January 3, 1979	Former representative (6 years, 2 months)
60	William Cohen (R-ME)	January 3, 1979	Former representative (6 years)
61	William L. Armstrong (R-CO)	January 3, 1979	Former representative (4 years) - Colorado 30th in population (1970)
62	Larry Pressler (R-SD)	January 3, 1979	Former representative (4 years) - South Dakota 44th in population (1970)
63	David L. Boren (D-OK)	January 3, 1979	Former governor - Oklahoma 27th in population (1970)
64	J. James Exon (D-NE)	January 3, 1979	Former governor - Nebraska 35th in population (1970)
65	Carl Levin (D-MI)	January 3, 1979	Michigan 7th in population (1970)
66	Bill Bradley (D-NJ)	January 3, 1979	New Jersey 8th in population (1970)
67	Howell Heflin (D-AL)	January 3, 1979	Alabama 21st in population (1970)
68	Gordon J. Humphrey (R-NH)	January 3, 1979	New Hampshire 41st in population (1970)
69	George J. Mitchell (D-ME)	May 17, 1980	
70	Warren Rudman (R-NH)	December 31, 1980	
71	Paula Hawkins (R-FL)	January 1, 1981	
72	Jeremiah Denton (R-AL)	January 2, 1981	
73	Mark Andrews (R-ND)	January 3, 1981	Former representative (16 years)
74	Steve Symms (R-ID)	January 3, 1981	Former representative (12 years)
75	James Abdnor (R-SD)	January 3, 1981	Former representative (8 years)
76	Chris Dodd (D-CT)	January 3, 1981	Former representative (6 years) - Connecticut 24th in population (1970)
77	Chuck Grassley (R-IA)	January 3, 1981	Former representative (6 years) - Iowa 25th in population (1970)
78	Dan Quayle (R-IN)	January 3, 1981	Former representative (4 years) - Indiana 11th in population (1970)
79	Bob Kasten (R-WI)	January 3, 1981	Former representative (4 years) - Wisconsin 16th in population (1970)
80	Al D'Amato (R-NY)	January 3, 1981	New York 2nd in population (1970)
81	Arlen Specter (R-PA)	January 3, 1981	Pennsylvania 3rd in population (1970)
82	Alan J. Dixon (D-IL)	January 3, 1981	Illinois 5th in population (1970)
83	John Porter East (R-NC)	January 3, 1981	North Carolina 12th in population (1970)
84	Mack Mattingly (R-GA)	January 3, 1981	Georgia 15th in population (1970)
85	Slade Gorton (R-WA)	January 3, 1981	Washington 22nd in population (1970)
86	Don Nickles (R-OK)	January 3, 1981	Oklahoma 27th in population (1970)
87	Frank Murkowski (R-AK)	January 3, 1981	Alaska 50th in population (1970)
88	Frank Lautenberg (D-NJ)	December 27, 1982	
89	Paul Trible (R-VA)	January 3, 1983	Former representative
90	Pete Wilson (R-CA)	January 3, 1983	California 1st in population (1980)
91	Jeff Bingaman (D-NM)	January 3, 1983	New Mexico 37th in population (1980)
92	Chic Hecht (R-NV)	January 3, 1983	Nevada 43rd in population (1980)
93	Daniel J. Evans (R-WA)	September 12, 1983	
94	John Kerry (D-MA)	January 2, 1985	
95	Paul Simon (D-IL)	January 3, 1985	Former representative (10 years) - Illinois 5th in population (1980)
96	Tom Harkin (D-IA)	January 3, 1985	Former representative (10 years) - Iowa 27th in population (1980)
97	Al Gore (D-TN)	January 3, 1985	Former representative (8 years)
98	Phil Gramm (R-TX)	January 3, 1985	Former representative (6 years)
99	Mitch McConnell (R-KY)	January 3, 1985	
100	Jay Rockefeller (D-WV)	January 15, 1985	
	Jim Broyhill (R-NC)	July 14, 1986	
	Terry Sanford (D-NC)	November 5, 1986	

The most senior senators by class were John C. Stennis (D-Mississippi) from Class 1, Strom Thurmond (R-South Carolina) from Class 2, and Russell B. Long (D-Louisiana) from Class 3.

== See also ==
- 99th United States Congress
- List of United States representatives in the 99th Congress
