= Elwood Hillis =

American politician (1926–2023)

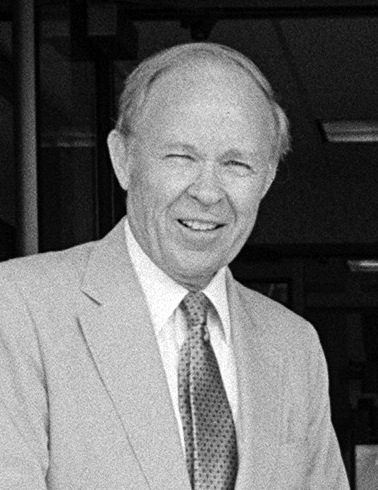
- Hillis in 1986

Member of the U.S. House of Representatives from Indiana's 5th district
- In office January 3, 1971 – January 3, 1987
- Preceded by: Richard L. Roudebush
- Succeeded by: Jim Jontz

Member of the Indiana House of Representatives from the Howard and Tipton counties
- In office January 5, 1967 – January 3, 1971
- Preceded by: multi-member district
- Succeeded by: multi-member district

Personal details
- Born: Elwood Haynes Hillis; March 6, 1926 Kokomo, Indiana, U.S.
- Died: January 4, 2023 (aged 96) Windsor, Colorado, U.S.
- Party: Republican
- Spouse: Carol Hoyne (m. 1949; died 2015)
- Children: 3
- Education: Indiana University Bloomington (BS, JD)
- Occupation: Attorney

Military service
- Branch/service: United States Army
- Years of service: 1944–1954
- Rank: Captain
- Battles/wars: World War II

Elwood Haynes "Bud" Hillis (March 6, 1926 – January 4, 2023) was an American politician and lawyer from Indiana who served as a member of the Indiana House of Representatives representing Howard County, Indiana and Tipton County, Indiana from 1967 to 1971 and as a member of the United States House of Representatives representing Indiana's 5th congressional district for eight terms from 1971 to 1987. He was a member of the Republican Party.

== Personal life and early career ==
Born in Kokomo, Indiana to Glen Raymond Hillis and Bernice (Haynes) Hillis, he attended Kokomo public schools. He graduated from Culver Military Academies, 1944. B.S., Indiana University Bloomington, 1949. J.D., Indiana University School of Law, 1952.

Bud Hillis was a younger brother to renowned choral director Margaret Hillis. Their father, Glen R. Hillis, was the Republican nominee for Governor of Indiana in 1940, losing by less than 4,000 votes. His maternal grandfather and namesake, Elwood Haynes, was an inventor and automobile pioneer.

Hillis married the former Carol Hoyne, a native of Allen County, Ohio in a one ring ceremony on June 12, 1949, at Trinity United Methodist Church in the town of Lima, Ohio. Together, they had three sons, Jeffrey, Gary, and Bradley, as well as three grandchildren, Faith, Jared, and Laura. Shortly after he left the U.S. House of Representatives, their son Bradley died in Miami, where he lived for a few years, on November 17, 1987. For the remainder of their marriage, they resided in Windsor, Colorado, a town mostly in Weld County, Colorado, to be near family. Carol Hillis died on August 24, 2015, nine days before her 87th birthday.

=== Military career ===
Hillis served in the United States Army in the European Theater with the rank of first lieutenant from 1944 to 1946. He retired from the Reserves in 1954 with rank of captain in the infantry.

== Political career ==
Hillis was admitted to the bar in 1952 and commenced practice in Kokomo.

Hillis served as a member of the Indiana House of Representatives in the 95th General Assembly and the 96th General Assembly.

Hillis also served as a delegate at the Indiana State Republican conventions from 1962 to 1970.

=== Congress ===
Hillis was elected as a Republican Party member to the 92nd United States Congress and to the seven succeeding Congresses (January 3, 1971 – January 3, 1987). He was not a candidate for reelection in 1986.

=== Later career ===
Hillis resumed the practice of law.

On March 17, 2010, Bud Hillis was honored for his years in public service at the Howard County Lincoln Day Dinner, held at the Kokomo Country Club in Kokomo, Indiana.

== Death ==
Hillis died on January 4, 2023, in Windsor, Colorado at age 96. He was interred at Kokomo Memorial Park Cemetery.

== See also ==
U.S. House of Representatives
Preceded by Richard L. Roudebush	Member of the U.S. House of Representatives from Indiana's 5th congressional district 1971 – 1987	Succeeded by Jim Jontz
