= Jim Jontz =

American politician

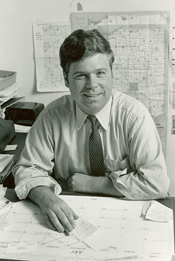

Member of the U.S. House of Representatives from Indiana's 5th district
- In office January 3, 1987 – January 3, 1993
- Preceded by: Elwood Hillis
- Succeeded by: Steve Buyer

Member of the Indiana Senate from the 7th district
- In office November 7, 1984 – November 18, 1986
- Preceded by: John "Jack" Martin Guy
- Succeeded by: Katie Wolf

Member of the Indiana House of Representatives from the 25th district
- In office November 3, 1982 – November 7, 1984
- Preceded by: Ralph Duckwall
- Succeeded by: Katie Wolf

Member of the Indiana House of Representatives from the 20th district
- In office November 6, 1974 – November 3, 1982
- Preceded by: John "Jack" Martin Guy
- Succeeded by: Barbara Louise Engle

Personal details
- Born: James Prather Jontz; December 18, 1951 Indianapolis, Indiana, U.S.
- Died: April 14, 2007 (aged 55) Portland, Oregon, U.S.
- Party: Democratic
- Education: Williams College; Indiana University Bloomington; Butler University; Valparaiso University School of Law
- Occupation: Politician

James Prather Jontz (December 18, 1951 – April 14, 2007) was an American politician who represented the Indiana's 5th congressional district, comprising rural north central Indiana, centering on Kokomo and Logansport. A Democrat, he served in the United States House of Representatives from 1987 to 1993. He was previously a member of the Indiana General Assembly. To date, he was the last Democrat to represent his district in Congress.

== Early life and education ==
He was born in Indianapolis, Indiana, in 1951. He graduated at the age of 17 from North Central High School in Washington Township in Indianapolis.

Jontz began his collegiate studies at Williams College and transferred to Indiana University Bloomington, where he graduated with honors (Phi Beta Kappa) in less than three years with a degree in geology. He was active in Crisis Biology and lobbied on behalf of a host of environmental causes while a student on the IU Bloomington campus. Despite a heavy study load, and involvement in student government and extra curricular affairs, Jontz co-founded the Indiana Public Interest Research Group as a Senior working project. He obtained a master's degree in history from Butler University, and graduated from Valparaiso University School of Law during his third term as State Representative. He also took graduate courses at Purdue University, West Lafayette, Indiana.

== Early political career ==
His political career began in 1974, sparked by his opposition to a dam-building project in Central Indiana. Running for a seat in the Indiana House of Representatives against the dam's sponsor, House Majority Leader John Guy, he was elected at age 22 - the second youngest person to serve in the Indiana House at the time - by a margin of only two votes in a major upset. He was reelected five more times in a heavily Republican district, even after the Republican-controlled legislature made it even more Republican on paper after the 1980 census. He was elected to the Indiana Senate in 1984, where he served for only two years before being elected to the U.S. House.

== U.S. House of Representatives ==
Jontz's campaigns for Congress drew national attention. Celebrity supporters included singers Carole King, Bob Weir, and Don Henley, designer Liz Claiborne, and actors Bonnie Franklin and Woody Harrelson. Most of this support stemmed from Jontz's work on environmental issues.

In 1990, he appeared in the press room at Farm Aid IV where he played an impromptu straight man while Arlo Guthrie made jokes.

=== Elections ===
Jontz was elected to Congress in 1986 after the retirement of 16-year incumbent Republican Bud Hillis. However, the Republican nominee, State Senator James Butcher, was wounded from a fractious Republican primary, allowing Jontz to win narrowly. He was handily reelected in 1988, but faced much stiffer competition in 1990.

Jontz was a progressive Democrat, which seemingly made him an odd fit for his mostly rural north central Indiana district, centering on Kokomo and Logansport. He relied on two key strategies for his congressional elections. First, he embraced a very personal style of populist politics that included frequent appearances in every community in his district. Secondly, Jontz assembled a highly talented and dedicated staff of individuals to work with him, and later many of them-including Tom Sugar, Mike Busch, and Kathy Altman-held prominent government positions.

Jontz was narrowly defeated in 1992 by Steve Buyer, a young Army officer, Persian Gulf War veteran, and lawyer making his first bid for office.

=== Committee assignments ===
During his six-year tenure, he held committee memberships on the House Agriculture, Education and Labor, Veterans Affairs, and Select Committee on Aging. He also championed the preservation of the ancient forests in the Pacific Northwest, and worked to foster collaborations between organized labor and environmentalists.

== 1994 U.S. Senate election ==
Jontz attempted to return to Washington in 1994 by challenging three-term Senator Dick Lugar. He lost to Lugar by more than 600,000 votes, and even lost his old congressional district.

== Post-congressional career ==
Following his 1994 defeat, Jontz began working as Executive Director for the Western Ancient Forest Campaign, advocating against the Timber Salvage Rider. In 1999, Jontz helped organize the Alliance for Sustainable Jobs and the Environment (ASJE). While with WAFC, Jontz built a grassroots organizing campaign which pushed aggressively to protect forests, remove federal subsidies that financed clearcutting, and preserve millions of acres of previously unprotected roadless areas in National Forests. During his tenure with WAFC, he travelled extensively around the country forming relationships with state and local forest protection groups. As a result, Jontz was revered by forest activists throughout North America. In the spirit of Martin Luther King Jr., Jontz participated in acts of civil disobedience – including blocking a logging road in the Siskiyou National Forest in Oregon – to raise awareness about the plight of ancient forests. These acts were hailed by forest advocates as further proof that Jontz was one of the greatest leaders of the modern environmental movement. Jontz was president of Americans for Democratic Action (ADA) from 1998 to 2002. He was president emeritus and project coordinator for ADA's Working Families Win project before his death.

== Death ==
Jontz died on April 14, 2007, in Portland, Oregon following a lengthy battle with colon cancer.

Party political offices
Preceded by Jack Wickes	Democratic nominee for U.S. Senator from Indiana (Class 1); 1994	Succeeded by David L. Johnson
U.S. House of Representatives
Preceded by Elwood Hillis	Member of the U.S. House of Representatives from Indiana's 5th congressional district 1987–1993	Succeeded by Steve Buyer
