= Hugh Alexander =

Hugh Alexander may refer to:

- Hugh E. Alexander (1884–1957), Scottish minister
- Hugh Quincy Alexander (1911–1989), Democratic U.S. Representative from North Carolina
- Conel Hugh O'Donel Alexander (1909–1974), British chess player and cryptanalyst
- Hugh Alexander (baseball) (1917–2000), American baseball outfielder and scout
