= North Carolina's 37th House district =

American legislative district

North Carolina's 37th State House of Representatives district
Representative
Erin Paré; R–Holly Springs
- Demographics: 68% White; 13% Black; 11% Hispanic; 3% Asian; 4% Multiracial
- Population (2024): 101,161

North Carolina's 37th House district is one of 120 districts in the North Carolina House of Representatives. It has been represented by Republican Erin Paré since 2021.

== Geography ==
Since 2003, the district has included part of southern Wake County. The district overlaps with the 13th Senate district.

== District officeholders ==
=== Multi-member district ===
Representative	Party	Dates	Notes	Representative	Party	Dates	Notes	Representative	Party	Dates	Notes	Counties
District created January 1, 1967.
Basil Barr (West Jefferson)	Democratic	January 1, 1967 – January 1, 1973	Redistricted from the Ashe County district.	P. C. Collins Jr. (Laurel Springs)	Democratic	January 1, 1967 – January 1, 1973		Hugh Merritt (Mount Airy)	Democratic	January 1, 1967 – January 1, 1969	Redistricted from the Surry County district.	1967–1973; All of Ashe, Alleghany, Surry, and Stokes counties.
Basil Barr (West Jefferson)	Democratic	January 1, 1967 – January 1, 1973	Redistricted from the Ashe County district.	P. C. Collins Jr. (Laurel Springs)	Democratic	January 1, 1967 – January 1, 1973		J. Worth Gentry (King)	Democratic	January 1, 1969 – January 1, 1973		1967–1973; All of Ashe, Alleghany, Surry, and Stokes counties.
George Marion Jr. (Dobson)	Democratic	January 1, 1971 – January 1, 1973		P. C. Collins Jr. (Laurel Springs)	Democratic	January 1, 1967 – January 1, 1973		J. Worth Gentry (King)	Democratic	January 1, 1969 – January 1, 1973		1967–1973; All of Ashe, Alleghany, Surry, and Stokes counties.
Robert Quincy Beard (Newton)	Republican	January 1, 1973 – January 1, 1975	Redistricted from the 40th district.	G. Hunter Warlick (Hickory)	Republican	January 1, 1973 – January 1, 1975	Redistricted from the 40th district.					1973–1983; All of Catawba County.
Frances Ellen Setzer (Newton)	Democratic	January 1, 1975 – January 1, 1979		Cass Ballenger (Hickory)	Republican	January 1, 1975 – January 1, 1977	Retired to run for State Senate.					1973–1983; All of Catawba County.
Frances Ellen Setzer (Newton)	Democratic	January 1, 1975 – January 1, 1979		Julius Reid Poovey (Hickory)	Republican	January 1, 1977 – January 1, 1983	Redistricted to the 45th district.					1973–1983; All of Catawba County.
Carl William Rullman (Hickory)	Republican	January 1, 1979 – January 1, 1981		Julius Reid Poovey (Hickory)	Republican	January 1, 1977 – January 1, 1983	Redistricted to the 45th district.					1973–1983; All of Catawba County.
Austin Allran (Hickory)	Republican	January 1, 1981 – January 1, 1983	Redistricted to the 45th district.	Julius Reid Poovey (Hickory)	Republican	January 1, 1977 – January 1, 1983	Redistricted to the 45th district.					1973–1983; All of Catawba County.
James Erwin Lambeth Jr. (Thomasville)	Democratic	January 1, 1983 – January 1, 1985		John Wesley Varner (Lexington)	Democratic	January 1, 1983 – January 1, 1985		Betsy Lane Cochrane (Advance)	Republican	January 1, 1983 – January 1, 1989	Redistricted from the 30th district. Retired to run for State Senate.	1983–1993; All of Davidson and Davie counties. Part of Iredell County.
Charles Lemuel Cromer (Thomasville)	Republican	January 1, 1985 – January 1, 1991		Joe Hege Jr. (Lexington)	Republican	January 1, 1985 – January 1, 1993	Redistricted to the single-member district.	Betsy Lane Cochrane (Advance)	Republican	January 1, 1983 – January 1, 1989	Redistricted from the 30th district. Retired to run for State Senate.	1983–1993; All of Davidson and Davie counties. Part of Iredell County.
Charles Lemuel Cromer (Thomasville)	Republican	January 1, 1985 – January 1, 1991		Joe Hege Jr. (Lexington)	Republican	January 1, 1985 – January 1, 1993	Redistricted to the single-member district.	Julia Craven Howard (Mocksville)	Republican	January 1, 1989 – January 1, 1993	Redistricted to the 74th district.	1983–1993; All of Davidson and Davie counties. Part of Iredell County.
Jerry Dockham (Denton)	Republican	January 1, 1991 – January 1, 1993	Redistricted to the 94th district.	Joe Hege Jr. (Lexington)	Republican	January 1, 1985 – January 1, 1993	Redistricted to the single-member district.	Julia Craven Howard (Mocksville)	Republican	January 1, 1989 – January 1, 1993	Redistricted to the 74th district.	1983–1993; All of Davidson and Davie counties. Part of Iredell County.

=== Single-member district ===
Representative	Party	Dates	Notes	Counties
Paul Reeves McCrary (Lexington)	Democratic	January 1, 1993 – January 1, 2001	Retired.	1993–2003; Part of Davidson County.
Hugh Holliman (Lexington)	Democratic	January 1, 2001 – January 1, 2003	Redistricted to the 81st district.	1993–2003; Part of Davidson County.
Paul Stam (Apex)	Republican	January 1, 2003 – January 1, 2017	Retired.	2003–Present; Part of Wake County.
Linda Hunt Williams (Holly Springs)	Republican	January 1, 2017 – August 31, 2018	Resigned.	2003–Present; Part of Wake County.
Vacant		August 31, 2018 – September 21, 2018		2003–Present; Part of Wake County.
John Adcock (Holly Springs)	Republican	September 21, 2018 – January 1, 2019	Appointed to finish Williams' term. Lost re-election.	2003–Present; Part of Wake County.
Sydney Batch (Holly Springs)	Democratic	January 1, 2019 – January 1, 2021	Lost re-election.	2003–Present; Part of Wake County.
Erin Paré (Holly Springs)	Republican	January 1, 2021 – Present		2003–Present; Part of Wake County.

== Election results ==
=== 2026 ===
North Carolina House of Representatives 37th district Democratic primary election, 2026
Party	Candidate	Votes	%
Democratic	Winn Decker	4,720	50.34%
Democratic	Marcus Gadson	3,568	38.05%
Democratic	Ralph Clements	1,088	11.60%
Total votes		9,376	100%

North Carolina House of Representatives 37th district general election, 2026
Party	Candidate	Votes	%
Republican	Erin Paré (incumbent)		
Democratic	Winn Decker		
Total votes			100%

=== 2024 ===
North Carolina House of Representatives 37th district general election, 2024
Party	Candidate	Votes	%
Republican	Erin Paré (incumbent)	30,784	51.41%
Democratic	Safiyah Jackson	27,137	45.32%
Libertarian	Christopher Robinson	1,963	3.28%
Total votes		59,884	100%
Republican hold			

=== 2022 ===
North Carolina House of Representatives 37th district Democratic primary election, 2022
Party	Candidate	Votes	%
Democratic	Christine Kelly	2,066	38.53%
Democratic	Elizabeth Parent	2,002	37.34%
Democratic	Mary Bethel	1,294	24.13%
Total votes		5,362	100%

North Carolina House of Representatives 37th district general election, 2022
Party	Candidate	Votes	%
Republican	Erin Paré (incumbent)	21,260	52.84%
Democratic	Christine Kelly	18,110	45.01%
Libertarian	Christopher Robinson	862	2.14%
Total votes		40,232	100%
Republican hold			

=== 2020 ===
North Carolina House of Representatives 37th district Republican primary election, 2020
Party	Candidate	Votes	%
Republican	Erin Paré	5,232	59.25%
Republican	Jeff Moore	1,926	21.81%
Republican	Anna Powell	1,673	18.94%
Total votes		8,831	100%

North Carolina House of Representatives 37th district general election, 2020
Party	Candidate	Votes	%
Republican	Erin Paré	35,136	50.06%
Democratic	Sydney Batch (incumbent)	32,842	46.79%
Libertarian	Liam Leaver	2,208	3.15%
Total votes		70,186	100%
Republican gain from Democratic			

=== 2018 ===
North Carolina House of Representatives 37th district general election, 2018
Party	Candidate	Votes	%
Democratic	Sydney Batch	22,803	49.92%
Republican	John Adcock (incumbent)	21,859	47.85%
Libertarian	Guy Meilleur	1,018	2.23%
Total votes		45,680	100%
Democratic gain from Republican			

=== 2016 ===
North Carolina House of Representatives 37th district general election, 2016
Party	Candidate	Votes	%
Republican	Linda Hunt Williams	27,448	52.29%
Democratic	Randy Barrow	22,569	43.00%
Libertarian	Robert Rose	2,474	4.71%
Total votes		52,491	100%
Republican hold			

=== 2014 ===
North Carolina House of Representatives 37th district general election, 2014
Party	Candidate	Votes	%
Republican	Paul Stam (incumbent)	20,972	100%
Total votes		20,972	100%
Republican hold			

=== 2012 ===
North Carolina House of Representatives 37th district general election, 2012
Party	Candidate	Votes	%
Republican	Paul Stam (incumbent)	24,942	57.01%
Democratic	Jason Ora Wunsch	18,809	42.99%
Total votes		43,751	100%
Republican hold			

=== 2010 ===
North Carolina House of Representatives 37th district general election, 2010
Party	Candidate	Votes	%
Republican	Paul Stam (incumbent)	24,937	64.00%
Democratic	Debra McHenry	14,028	36.00%
Total votes		38,965	100%
Republican hold			

=== 2008 ===
North Carolina House of Representatives 37th district general election, 2008
Party	Candidate	Votes	%
Republican	Paul Stam (incumbent)	32,172	53.91%
Democratic	Ed Ridpath	27,503	46.09%
Total votes		59,675	100%
Republican hold			

=== 2006 ===
North Carolina House of Representatives 37th district general election, 2006
Party	Candidate	Votes	%
Republican	Paul Stam (incumbent)	15,459	57.07%
Democratic	Ed Ridpath	11,628	42.93%
Total votes		27,087	100%
Republican hold			

=== 2004 ===
North Carolina House of Representatives 37th district general election, 2004
Party	Candidate	Votes	%
Republican	Paul Stam (incumbent)	29,596	85.39%
Libertarian	H. Wade Minter	5,064	14.61%
Total votes		34,660	100%
Republican hold			

=== 2002 ===
North Carolina House of Representatives 37th district Republican primary election, 2002
Party	Candidate	Votes	%
Republican	Paul Stam	2,457	57.87%
Republican	Kenn Gardner	1,789	42.13%
Total votes		4,246	100%

North Carolina House of Representatives 37th district general election, 2002
Party	Candidate	Votes	%
Republican	Paul Stam	15,647	59.05%
Democratic	J. C. Knowles	9,700	36.61%
Libertarian	Brad Wheeler	1,152	4.35%
Total votes		26,499	100%
Republican gain from Democratic			

=== 2000 ===
North Carolina House of Representatives 37th district Republican primary election, 2000
Party	Candidate	Votes	%
Republican	Cindy Akins	1,144	64.27%
Republican	Isaac "Zach" Wall Sr.	636	35.73%
Total votes		1,780	100%

North Carolina House of Representatives 37th district general election, 2000
Party	Candidate	Votes	%
Democratic	Hugh Holliman	10,676	56.80%
Republican	Cindy Akins	7,783	41.41%
Libertarian	Paul Burks	336	1.79%
Total votes		18,795	100%
Democratic hold			
