= Apex, North Carolina =

- Town
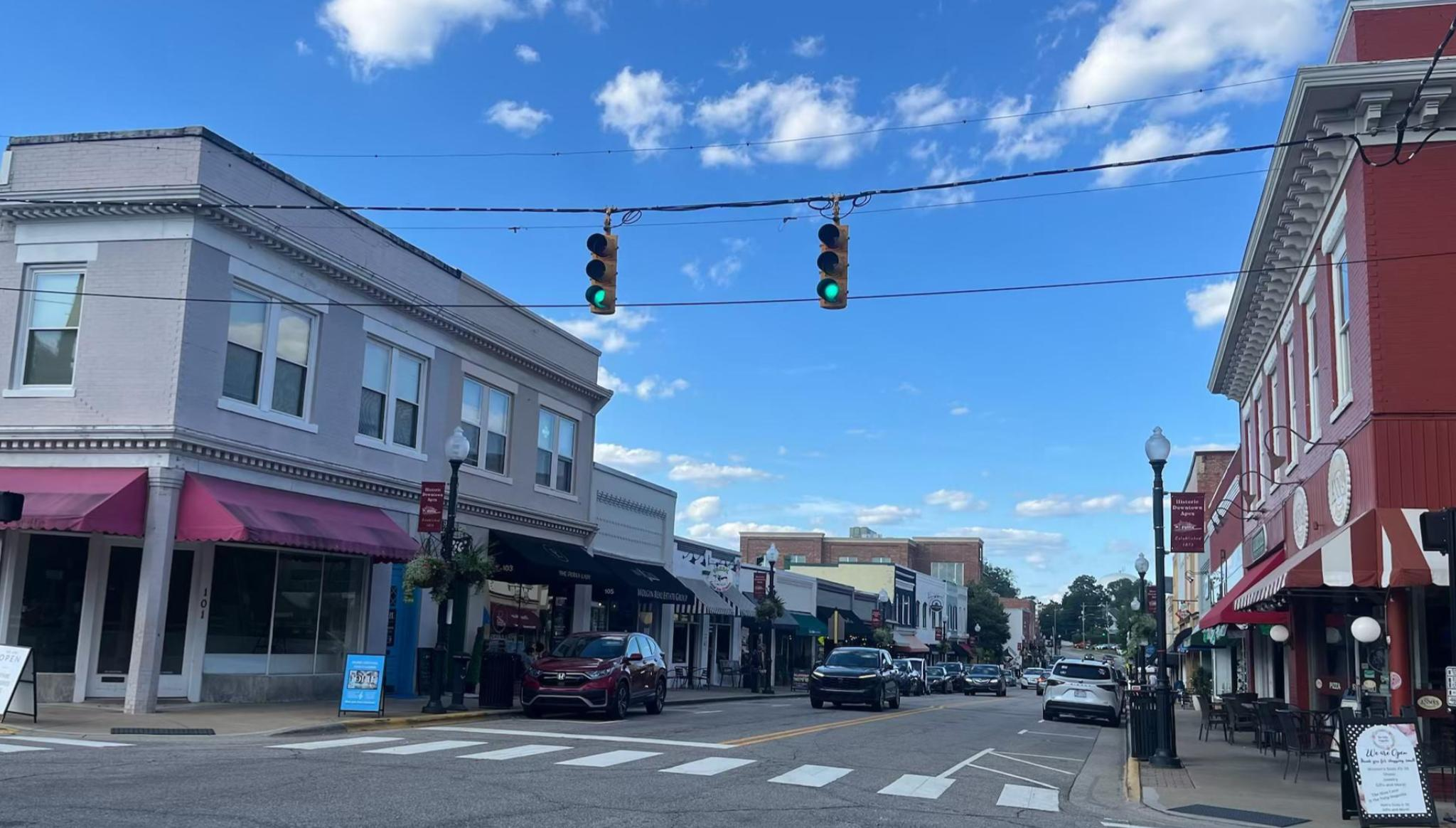
- Apex Historic District

- Flag Seal Logo
- Nickname: Peak City
- Motto: "The Peak of Good Living"
- Location within North Carolina Location within the United States Location within North America
- Coordinates: 35°43′11″N 78°50′38″W
- Country: United States
- State: North Carolina
- County: Chatham; Wake
- Incorporated: 1873
- Named for: Highest point on the Chatham Railroad

Government
  - Type: Council-manager
  - Body: Apex Town Council
  - Mayor: Jacques Gilbert

Area
  - Total: 25.15 sq mi (65.13 km^{2})
  - Land: 25.06 sq mi (64.90 km^{2})
  - Water: 0.089 sq mi (0.23 km^{2}) 0.36%
- Elevation: 390 ft (120 m)

Population (2020)
  - Total: 58,780
  - Estimate (2025): 80,419
  - Density: 2,345.7/sq mi (905.67/km^{2})
- Demonym: Apexian or Apexer
- Time zone: UTC−5 (EST)
  - Summer (DST): UTC−4 (EDT)
- ZIP codes: 27502, 27523, 27539
- Area codes: 919, 984
- FIPS code: 37-01520
- GNIS feature ID: 2405157
- Website: www.apexnc.org

Apex (/ˈeɪ.pɛks/) is a town in Wake and Chatham counties in the U.S. state of North Carolina. At its southern border, Apex encompasses the community of Friendship. In 1994, the downtown area was designated a historic district, and the Apex train depot, built in 1867, was designated a Wake County landmark. The depot location marks the highest point on the old Chatham Railroad, hence the town's name. The town motto is "the Peak of Good Living".

In the late 19th century, a small community developed around the Chatham railroad station, known as Log Pond, and later, Apex. Much of the forest in the surrounding area were cleared for farmland, which was mainly dedicated to tobacco farming. Since Apex was near the state capital, it became a trading center. The railroad shipped products such as lumber, tar, and tobacco. The town was officially incorporated in 1873. By 1900, the town had a population of 349. As of the 2020 census, its population was 58,780, making it the 17th-most-populous municipality in North Carolina.

The population boom occurred primarily in the late 1990s. The Research Triangle Park, established in the 1960s, created strong demand for technology workers, which also drove population growth.

== History ==
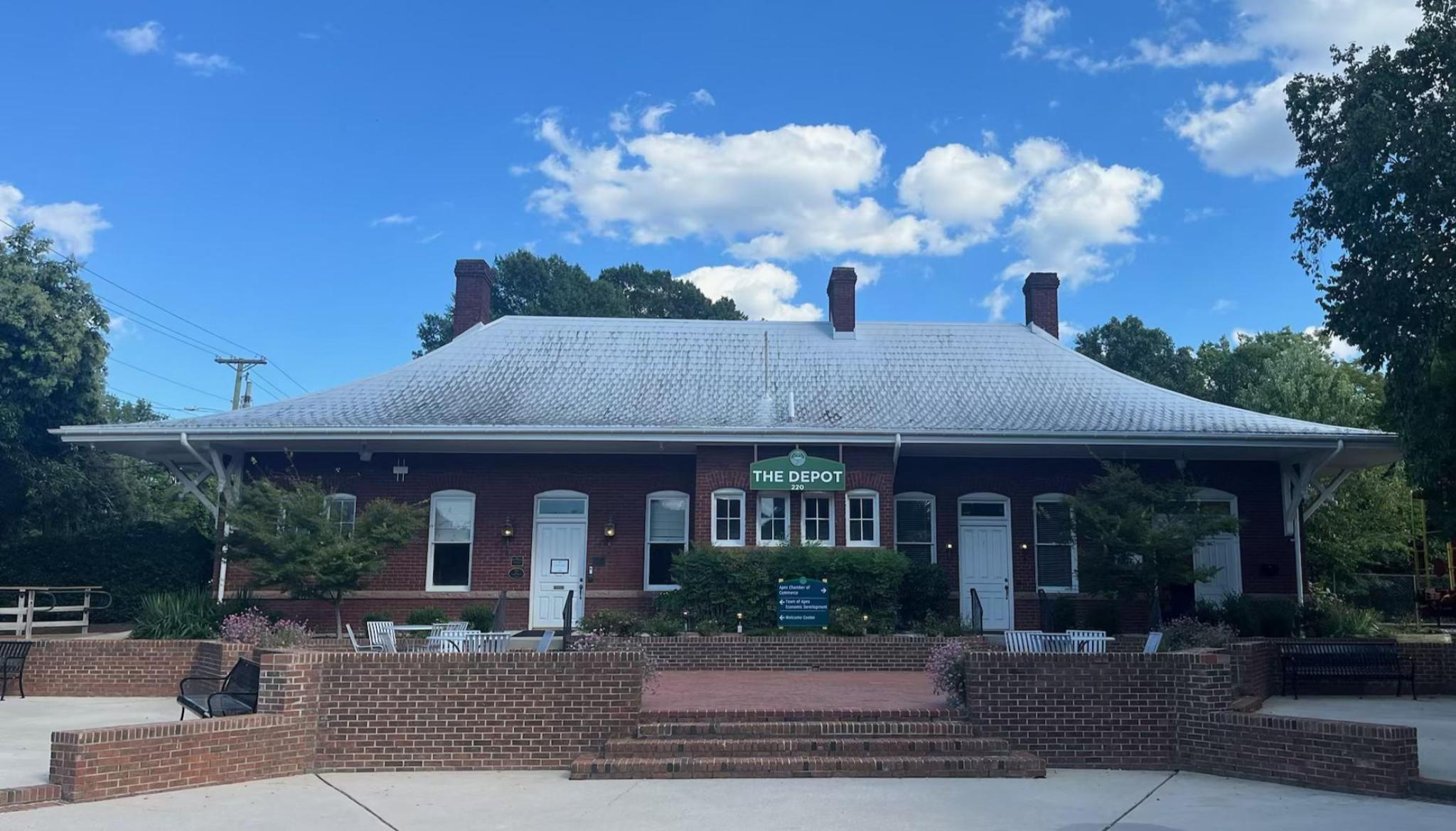
Apex Union Depot, built in 1914

In 1869, the Chatham Railroad, connecting Chatham County with Raleigh, was completed. At the highest point of the line, which railroad workers dubbed the "apex of the grade", existed a pond. Trains leaving out of Chatham would stop at the pond to replenish their water. A community began to grow around the stop. At the time, this community was known as "Log Pond"; the name almost certainly derives from the fact that the pond, which much resembled a small swamp, was covered in trees and vegetation, just like much of the surrounding area. People later called this area Apex, due to its position on the Chatham Railroad. The town of Apex was officially incorporated in 1873. As for the pond, it was eventually drained by culverts and ceased to exist by 1900.

Apex grew slowly through the succeeding decades, despite several devastating fires, including a June 12, 1911, conflagration that destroyed most of the downtown business district. The town center was rebuilt and stands to this day, now one of the most intact railroad towns in the state. At the heart of town stands the Apex Union Depot, originally a passenger station for the Seaboard Air Line Railroad and later home to the locally supported Apex Community Library. The depot now houses the Apex Chamber of Commerce.

Apex suffered mild setbacks during the Great Depression era, but growth began again in earnest in the 1950s. The town's proximity to Research Triangle Park spurred additional residential development, yet the town managed to preserve its small-town character. During the 1990s, the town's population quadrupled to over 20,000, placing new demands upon Apex's infrastructure.

Apex has continued to grow in recent years. A sizable shopping center was built at the intersection of Highway 55 and US 64, and several new neighborhoods have been built as the town grows toward the west.

In October 2006, a chemical explosion and fire in a waste-processing facility prompted the evacuation of over 16,000 residents. There were few serious injuries, and residents were soon able to return home. In 2009, a federal court approved a $7.85M settlement to compensate Apex residents affected by the disaster. Each household received $750. Businesses received $2,200.

In 2015, Apex was named the number-one place to live in America, according to Money.

In addition to the Apex Union Depot, the Apex City Hall, Apex Historic District, Calvin Wray Lawrence House, and Utley-Council House are listed on the National Register of Historic Places.

The $3 billion Veridea development was first proposed in 2009. New York-based RXR bought the first land in 2023, and site preparation began in 2025. The development was predicted to have 8,000 residential units, 3.5 million square feet of retail, and 12 million square feet of commercial space in 2035. Wake Technical Community College is expected to move its Western Wake campus to Veridea by 2029, and the future North Carolina Children's Hospital is also being built within the development.

== Geography ==
Interactive map of Apex

The town is a suburb of both Raleigh and Research Triangle Park (RTP). It is situated to the southwest of Raleigh with direct highway access via US 1. Apex is south of RTP with direct highway access via NC 540. Apex crests the watersheds of both the Neuse and Cape Fear Rivers. According to the United States Census Bureau, the town has a total area of 25.15 square miles (65.1 km^{2}), of which 0.09 sq mi (0.23 km^{2}) (0.36%) is covered by water. Neighboring towns include Cary to the north and northeast, Holly Springs to the south, and Raleigh to the east and northeast.

In April 2022, Apex expanded into neighboring Chatham County for the first time through the annexation of about 132 acres (53 ha) near North Carolina Highway 751.

=== Climate ===
Climate data for Apex, North Carolina, 1991–2020 normals, extremes 1993–present
Month	Jan	Feb	Mar	Apr	May	Jun	Jul	Aug	Sep	Oct	Nov	Dec	Year
Record high °F (°C)	80 (27)	82 (28)	89 (32)	92 (33)	96 (36)	103 (39)	103 (39)	104 (40)	100 (38)	98 (37)	87 (31)	80 (27)	104 (40)
Mean maximum °F (°C)	69.5 (20.8)	73.4 (23.0)	81.6 (27.6)	86.5 (30.3)	90.1 (32.3)	94.9 (34.9)	96.5 (35.8)	95.3 (35.2)	92.3 (33.5)	86.8 (30.4)	77.2 (25.1)	73.3 (22.9)	98.2 (36.8)
Mean daily maximum °F (°C)	50.9 (10.5)	54.4 (12.4)	61.9 (16.6)	71.6 (22.0)	78.7 (25.9)	85.7 (29.8)	89.0 (31.7)	87.4 (30.8)	81.5 (27.5)	71.8 (22.1)	62.2 (16.8)	53.9 (12.2)	70.7 (21.5)
Daily mean °F (°C)	40.9 (4.9)	43.5 (6.4)	50.5 (10.3)	59.6 (15.3)	67.7 (19.8)	75.4 (24.1)	79.2 (26.2)	77.5 (25.3)	71.6 (22.0)	60.7 (15.9)	50.9 (10.5)	44.0 (6.7)	60.1 (15.6)
Mean daily minimum °F (°C)	30.9 (−0.6)	32.6 (0.3)	39.1 (3.9)	47.6 (8.7)	56.7 (13.7)	65.2 (18.4)	69.4 (20.8)	67.7 (19.8)	61.7 (16.5)	49.5 (9.7)	39.5 (4.2)	34.1 (1.2)	49.5 (9.7)
Mean minimum °F (°C)	15.6 (−9.1)	18.5 (−7.5)	24.8 (−4.0)	33.9 (1.1)	44.1 (6.7)	57.1 (13.9)	61.9 (16.6)	61.3 (16.3)	52.3 (11.3)	36.9 (2.7)	26.3 (−3.2)	23.1 (−4.9)	14.3 (−9.8)
Record low °F (°C)	2 (−17)	3 (−16)	15 (−9)	26 (−3)	38 (3)	46 (8)	57 (14)	54 (12)	43 (6)	31 (−1)	20 (−7)	9 (−13)	2 (−17)
Average precipitation inches (mm)	3.65 (93)	3.00 (76)	4.08 (104)	3.63 (92)	3.83 (97)	4.33 (110)	5.07 (129)	4.64 (118)	5.27 (134)	3.71 (94)	3.45 (88)	3.67 (93)	48.33 (1,228)
Average snowfall inches (cm)	2.9 (7.4)	1.0 (2.5)	0.4 (1.0)	0.0 (0.0)	0.0 (0.0)	0.0 (0.0)	0.0 (0.0)	0.0 (0.0)	0.0 (0.0)	0.0 (0.0)	0.3 (0.76)	0.2 (0.51)	4.8 (12)
Average precipitation days (≥ 0.01 in)	10.2	9.5	10.5	9.8	10.2	10.9	11.7	10.3	8.7	7.9	8.4	10.6	118.7
Average snowy days (≥ 0.1 in)	1.4	0.7	0.4	0.0	0.0	0.0	0.0	0.0	0.0	0.0	0.1	0.6	3.2
Source 1: NOAA
Source 2: National Weather Service (mean maxima/minima 2006–2020)

== Government ==
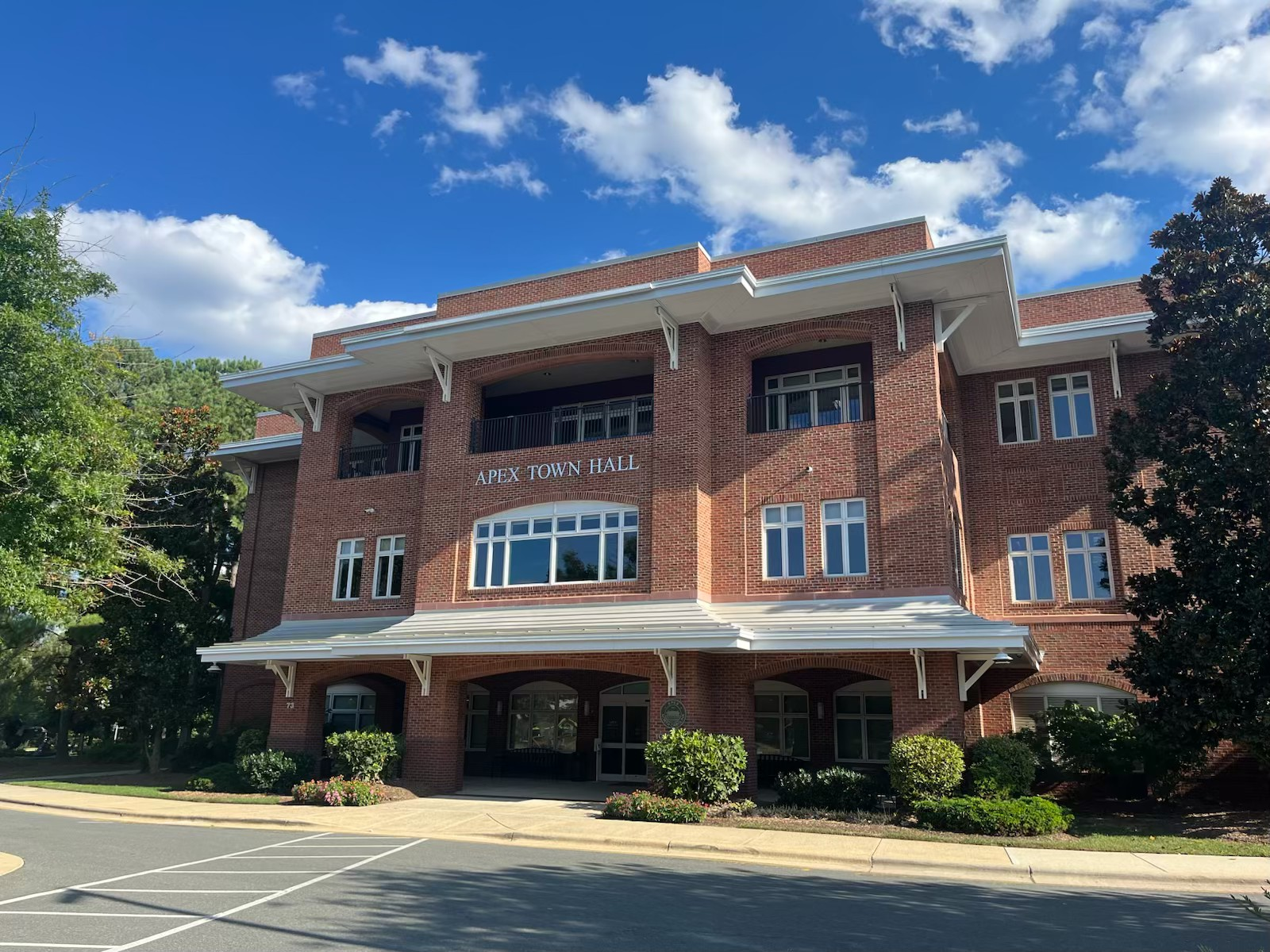
Apex Town Hall

Apex's council–manager form of government has a mayor and five council members (one of whom serves as mayor pro tem), who are each elected at-large in staggered, four-year terms. The town's attorney and manager serve at the pleasure of the council. All the other staff report to the town manager and handle the town's day-to-day business.

The town is led by Mayor Jacques K. Gilbert, elected in 2019. The council members, in order of tenure, are: Terry J. Mahaffey (2019), Ed Gray (2021), Arno Zegerman (2023), Sue Mu (2025), and Shane Reese (2025).

In the North Carolina House of Representatives, Apex is represented by Julie von Haefen (district 36), Erin Paré (district 37), and Gale Adcock (district 41). In the North Carolina Senate, Apex is represented by Sydney Batch (district 17). In the U.S. House of Representatives Apex is represented by Valerie Foushee (NC-04).

== Demographics ==
Historical population
Census	Pop.	Note	%±
1880	228		—
1890	269		18.0%
1900	349		29.7%
1910	681		95.1%
1920	926		36.0%
1930	863		−6.8%
1940	977		13.2%
1950	1,065		9.0%
1960	1,368		28.5%
1970	2,192		60.2%
1980	2,847		29.9%
1990	4,968		74.5%
2000	20,212		306.8%
2010	37,476		85.4%
2020	58,780		56.8%
2025 (est.)	80,419	▲	36.8%
U.S. Decennial Census

=== Racial and ethnic composition ===
Apex town, North Carolina – Racial and ethnic composition Note: the US Census treats Hispanic/Latino as an ethnic category. This table excludes Latinos from the racial categories and assigns them to a separate category. Hispanics/Latinos may be of any race.
Race / Ethnicity (NH = Non-Hispanic)	Pop 2000	Pop 2010	Pop 2020	% 2000	% 2010	% 2020
White alone (NH)	16,861	28,465	39,498	83.42%	75.96%	67.20%
Black or African American alone (NH)	1,510	2,785	3,852	7.47%	7.43%	6.55%
Native American or Alaska Native alone (NH)	43	77	99	0.21%	0.21%	0.17%
Asian alone (NH)	863	2,641	7,295	4.27%	7.05%	12.41%
Native Hawaiian or Pacific Islander alone (NH)	6	16	16	0.03%	0.04%	0.03%
Other race alone (NH)	24	78	297	0.12%	0.21%	0.51%
Mixed race or Multiracial (NH)	257	759	2,820	1.27%	2.03%	4.80%
Hispanic or Latino (any race)	648	2,655	4,903	3.21%	7.08%	8.34%
Total	20,212	37,476	58,780	100.00%	100.00%	100.00%

=== 2020 census ===
As of the 2020 census, 58,780 people and 14,027 families resided in the town. The median age was 36.1 years; 29.3% of the residents were under 18 and 8.9% were 65 or older. The female/male ratio was 1:0.937 overall and for 1:0.903 mfor those 18 and over.

About 97.0% of residents lived in urban areas, while 3.0% lived in rural areas.

Of the 20,851 households in Apex, 46.0% had children under 18 living in them, 62.1% were married-couple households, 11.4% were households with a male householder and no spouse or partner present, and 21.6% were households with a female householder and no spouse or partner present. About 19.0% of all households were made up of individuals, and 6.1% had someone living alone who was 65 or older.

The city had 22,151 housing units, of which 5.9% were vacant. The homeowner vacancy rate was 2.3% and the rental vacancy rate was 8.4%.

=== 2010 census ===
At the 2010 census, 37,476 people, 13,225 households, and 9,959 families lived in the town. The population density was 2,437.9 people per square mile. The 13,922 housing units had an average density of 905.8 per square mile. The racial makeup of the town was 69% White, 7% African American, 12% Asian, 3% from other races, and 9% from two or more races. Hispanics or Latinos of any race were 8% of the population.

=== Demographic estimates ===
In the 2019 ACS estimates, the average household size was 3.12 and the average family size was 2.81.

== Economy ==
=== Top employers ===
According to the 2020 Comprehensive Financial Report for Apex, these were the town's top employers:

Rank	Employer	Number of employees
1	Wake County Public Schools	1,779
2	Town of Apex	506
3	Dell	500
4	Apex Tool Group	425
5	Bland Landscaping	325
6	Costco	290
7	ATI Industrial Automation	275
8	Super Target	250
9	Walmart	243
10	Lowe's Home Improvement	220

== Schools ==
Apex's public schools are operated by the Wake County Public School System.

Over 4,000 students are enrolled in two public high schools in Apex, Apex Friendship High School and Apex High School.

Public middle schools include:

- Apex Friendship Middle School
- Apex Middle School
- Lufkin Road Middle School
- Salem Middle School

Public elementary schools include:

- Apex Elementary School
- Apex Friendship Elementary School
- Baucom Elementary School
- Laurel Park Elementary School
- Olive Chapel Elementary School
- Salem Elementary School
- Scotts Ridge Elementary School

Private schools:

- Peace Montessori School
- St. Mary Magdalene Catholic School
- Thales Academy of Apex

Charter schools:

- Peak Charter Academy
- Triangle Math and Science Academy of Apex

== Infrastructure ==
=== Transportation ===
==== Roads ====
- US 1, US 64, and NC 55 are the major roads through Apex. A short portion of NC 751 also passes through the town's municipal boundaries.
- The Triangle Expressway southwestern section ( NC 540) is a toll road connecting to I-540. This is a partially completed loop road around the greater Raleigh area.
- The Apex Peakway is a loop road orbiting downtown Apex. The peakway was conceived as a means to relieve traffic in the downtown area and provide a bypass for commuters traveling from one side of the town to the other. It is currently the only "peakway" in North Carolina, taking its name from Apex's town motto: "The Peak of Good Living." When finished, the Apex Peakway will be 6 miles (9.7 km) long; so far 5 miles (8.0 km) have been constructed.

==== Transit ====
- Air: – Raleigh–Durham International Airport is on I-40 approximately 12 miles north of downtown Apex. – Raleigh Executive Jetport is to the south on US 1, 22 miles from downtown.
- Rail:Apex is not served directly by passenger trains. Amtrak serves the nearby municipalities of Cary and Raleigh. CSX manages a freight train switch yard in the center of Apex.
- Bus: The Triangle Transit Authority branded as GoTriangle operates buses that serve the region and connect to municipal bus systems in Raleigh, Durham, and Chapel Hill. Greyhound has terminals in Raleigh and Durham. In 2022, GoTriangle launched its first Apex branded bus service, GoApex. GoCary also operates an express route that connects the two communities.

==== Bicycle ====
- U.S. Bicycle Route 1 routes through downtown Apex.
- North Carolina Bicycle Route 5 connects Apex to Wilmington and closely parallels the NCBC Randonneurs 600-kilometer brevet route.
- There are numerous greenway trails including the Beaver Creek Trail and the American Tobacco Trail popular with cyclists.

=== Utilities ===
Apex Utilities provides water/sewer, electricity, garbage, recycling, and yard waste pickup. Natural Gas is provided by PSNC.

=== Health care ===
Emergency, primary, and specialist care is provided at the WakeMed Apex Healthplex.

=== Fire ===
Fire protection is provided by the Apex Fire Department operating from five stations, with a sixth under construction in 2022.

=== Police ===
Police service is provided by the Apex Police Department.

== Parks and recreation ==
The Apex Parks, Recreation, and Cultural Resources Department manages many parks, greenways, and sport programs, including a skate park near downtown.

Major parks include:

- Apex Community Park
- Apex Jaycee Park
- Hunter Street Park and Trackside Skate Plaza
- Kelly Road Park
- Nature Park and Seymour Athletic Fields
- Pleasant Park (opened in November 2023)
- Salem Pond Park

Both youth and adult sport programs are available for:

- Baseball
- Basketball
- Lacrosse
- Soccer
- Softball
- Tennis
- Volleyball

== Arts and culture ==
- Apex PeakFest is the community's annual festival held on the first Saturday in May. The downtown area is closed off and over 200 vendors provide food, arts and crafts, rides, and other entertainment.
- The Halle Cultural Arts Center provides a theater, classroom, and gallery spaces. It was built as the Town Hall in 1912.

== Notable people ==
- Jayson Alexander, racing driver
- Wes Durham, sportscaster
- Matthew Edwards, soccer player
- Tim Federowicz, MLB player
- Seth Frankoff, MLB player
- Randi Griffin, ice hockey player who competed in the 2018 Winter Olympics as part of the Unified Korea women's national team
- Susan Higginbotham, American historical fiction author and attorney
- C. J. Hunter, 1999 World Champion shot putter and later coach
- Silver Iocovozzi, chef
- Justin Jedlica, known as the Human Ken Doll
- Matt Mangini, former MLB player for the Seattle Mariners
- Sio Moore, former NFL player for the Oakland Raiders, Indianapolis Colts, Kansas City Chiefs, and Arizona Cardinals
- Landon Powell, former MLB player for the Oakland Athletics
- Julia Montgomery Street, American poet, playwright, and author
- William Wynn, NFL defensive end
- Sosocamo, rapper

== See also ==
- List of municipalities in North Carolina
