= James Edgar Broyhill =

American industrialist (1892–1988)

James Edgar ("Ed") Broyhill

James Edgar "Ed" Broyhill (May 5, 1892 – July 1, 1988) was an American industrialist and the founder of Broyhill Furniture Industries, Inc.

== Early life ==
Broyhill was born on a small farm in Boomer Township located in Wilkes County, North Carolina. His father, Isaac Broyhill, was born at Moravian Fall, North Carolina, to a family whose origins can be traced back to England. His mother, Margaret Parsons, was also born in Wilkes County, North Carolina. Broyhill's siblings were Thomas Hamilton Broyhill; Gordon A. Broyhill; John M. Broyhill; William C. Broyhill; Mary Broyhill; Isaac Jefferson Broyhill; and Myrtle M. Broyhill.

From an early age Broyhill worked on the family farm. He attended school at a small one-room schoolhouse in Boomer Township from the time he was 6 years old until he was 18. Broyhill supplemented his formal education by serving as a tallyman in his family's lumber business. Broyhill left home to pursue a high school diploma at Appalachian Training School located in Boone, North Carolina. Today, the school is known as Appalachian State University.

Broyhill served in World War I in the Army Corps of Engineers in Washington, D.C.

== Career ==
Following his discharge from the Army, Broyhill went to work for his brother, Tom, owner of a furniture company located in Lenoir, North Carolina. Broyhill served as a clerk and then a salesman.

In 1926, when a key supplier of chairs, rockers and benches, the Bernhardt Chair Company, burned to the ground. Broyhill mortgaged his house for $5,000 to found the Lenoir Chair Company. In June 1927, Broyhill expanded the operation by agreeing to lease a blacksmith and buggy shop adjacent to a Carolina and Northwestern Railway Depot.

In 1929, Ed Broyhill and Tom Broyhill teamed up to purchase Harper Furniture. The stock market crash of 1929 soon followed, bringing about the Great Depression which slowed Broyhill's expansion efforts.

Broyhill's expansion during the Great Depression led to some financial difficulties. A$100,000 consolidation loan that Broyhill secured in 1939 from a local bank helped the company to survive the end of the Depression.

In 1941, Broyhill acquired the McDowell Furniture Company located in Marion, North Carolina, and the Conover Furniture Company. The acquisitions gave Broyhill another 150,000 square feet of floor space, machinery, and a large line of medium-to-low price furniture. Broyhill added a sixth plant in 1942, acquiring The Wrenn Furniture Company at another bankruptcy auction.

In 1954, Broyhill built his first new plant on a 65-acre tract located just outside of Lenoir. In 1957, Broyhill established the Broyhill Premier line. Following the creation of the Premier line, Broyhill grouped the company's remaining products under the label "Lenoir House", which featured more moderately priced furniture. The Premier line began to turn a profit in the 1960s, around the time that Broyhill constructed a new three-story office and showroom building. In 1970, the company opened a facility to manufacture plastic furniture. In the mid-1970s, the company expanded its operations outside of North Carolina for the first time, constructing a large facility in Summerville, South Carolina and acquiring an upholstered furniture manufacturing plant in Arcadia, Louisiana. In 1978, Broyhill launched a line of furniture that customers assembled themselves, a line of wall units, as well as upgraded fabric patterns for its upholstered furniture lines. By the end of the decade, Broyhill operated 20 factories, 60 free standing stores, and 250 Broyhill Showcase stores staffed by more than 7,500 employees, with annual sales of approximately $350 million.

In August 1980, Broyhill was purchased by Interco, Inc., a St. Louis based manufacturer of shoes and clothing, for $151.5 million.

== Political career ==
In the early days of World War II, Broyhill was named to the Furniture Industry Advisory Committee of the Office of Price Administration. In his capacity, Broyhill assisted in the determination of proper allocation of resources between the military and civilians. In 1943, Broyhill was elected to the Southern Furniture Manufacturers Association and helped get price controls on furniture lifted. Broyhill served as the National Committeeman for North Carolina's Republican National Committee from 1948 to 1976, as well as the North Carolina representative to its finance committee.

== Personal life and death ==
Broyhill married Satie Hunt, a former Boone student and aspiring musician, on June 18, 1921. They had four children, including Jim Broyhill.

Broyhill died at age 96, on July 1, 1988, of natural causes. He was buried in the Little Rock Baptist Church Cemetery in North Carolina.

== Broyhill Family Foundation ==
Broyhill founded the Broyhill Family Foundation in 1946. Since its founding, Broyhill and the Foundation have donated over $100 million to many charitable causes. The Foundation primarily supports endowments for programs and scholarships at various colleges, for health care research and programs, and non-profit, charitable organizations. The Foundation funded the construction of the J.E. Broyhill Civic Center, the Broyhill Equestrian Preserve, the Broyhill Chapel & Bentley Fellowship Hall at Mars Hill University, the Broyhill Adventure Course and the Broyhill School of Management at Gardner-Webb University, and the Broyhill Commons and James T. Broyhill Stadium Entrance at Appalachian State University, among others. The Broyhill Home was founded in 1971 in Clyde, North Carolina. It is a residential facility for school-age children that employs live-in childcare workers that provide children with daily support and care.

== Honors and recognition ==
- In 1946, Broyhill was named "Furniture Man of the Year" by the Board of Governors of the American Furniture Mart for industrial, civic, and social service.
- In 1967, Broyhill was named by the Southern Manufacturer's Association to receive the James T. Ryan Award.
- In 1971, Broyhill earned an honorary doctorate, the Doctor of Commercial Science, from Appalachian State University.
- In 1990, Broyhill was inducted into the North Carolina Business Hall of Fame.
