= 1986 North Carolina's 10th congressional district special election =

- November 4, 1986
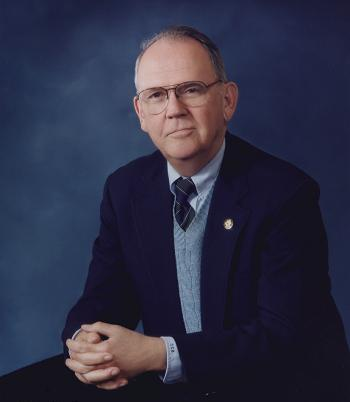

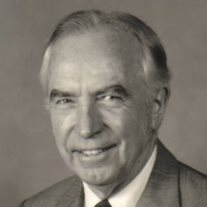
Nominee	Cass Ballenger	Lester D. Roark
Party	Republican	Democratic
Popular vote	82,973	61,204
Percentage	57.55%	42.45%
Representative before election
Jim Broyhill
Elected Representative
Cass Ballenger
Republican

A special election to the United States House of Representatives for North Carolina's 10th congressional district was held November 4, 1986.

The winning candidate would serve briefly in the United States House of Representatives to represent North Carolina in the 99th Congress until the General election on January 3, 1987, however Cass Ballenger won the general election for the seat which occurred on the same day as the special election to win election to a full 2-year term until January 3, 1989.

== Background ==
On July 14, 1986, Incumbent U.S. Representative Jim Broyhill retired after being appointed by then-Governor of North Carolina James G. Martin to the United States Senate succeeding the late-U.S. Senator John Porter East, who died of suicide. A special election was held to fill the vacancy caused by his appointment.

== Democratic primary ==
=== Candidates ===
==== Nominee ====
- Lester D. Roark, former Shelby Mayor and City Council member

==== Eliminated in Primary ====
- Jack L. Rhyne, nominee for this seat in 1974
- Ted A. Poovey, candidate for this seat in 1984
- Denny R. Hickman
- Steve Dolley Jr., lawyer

=== Results ===
Democratic primary results
Party	Candidate	Votes	%
Democratic	Lester D. Roark	14,834	40.06%
Democratic	Jack L. Rhyne	10,865	29.34%
Democratic	Steve Dolley Jr.	7,055	19.05%
Democratic	Ted A. Poovey	2,896	7.82%
Democratic	Denny R. Hickman	1,384	3.74%
Total votes		37,034	100.00%

Democratic primary runoff results
Party	Candidate	Votes	%
Democratic	Lester D. Roark	10,103	65.97%
Democratic	Jack L. Rhyne	5,221	34.03%
Total votes		15,324	100.00%

== Republican primary ==
=== Candidates ===
==== Nominee ====
- Cass Ballenger, former state senator (1977-1985) and former state representative (1975-1977)

==== Eliminated in Primary ====
- George S. Robinson, state representative (1980-1986)
- W. Hall Young, perennial candidate

=== Results ===
Republican primary results
Party	Candidate	Votes	%
Republican	Cass Ballenger	14,703	53.30%
Republican	George S. Robinson	11,654	42.25%
Republican	W. Hall Young	1,288	4.45%
Total votes		27,585	100%

== General election ==
1986 North Carolina's 10th congressional district special election
Party	Candidate	Votes	%	±%
Republican	Cass Ballenger	82,973	57.55%	−15.81%
Democratic	Lester D. Roark	61,205	42.25%	+15.82%
Turnout		144,178	100.00%	
Republican hold				

== See also ==
- United States House of Representatives elections, 1982
- United States House of Representatives elections, 1984
