= John Adcock =

American politician

Representative John Adcock

Member of the North Carolina House of Representatives from the 37th district
- In office September 21, 2018 – January 1, 2019
- Preceded by: Linda Hunt Williams
- Succeeded by: Sydney Batch

Personal details
- Party: Republican

John B. Adcock (born April 1968) is a Republican politician who served in the North Carolina General Assembly representing House District 37 in Wake County. He was appointed in September 2018 and was defeated in the subsequent election by Democrat Sydney Batch.

== Background and professional experience ==
Adcock is a lifelong resident of Southern Wake County and graduated from Fuquay-Varina High School. He received a BA in Community & Regional Planning/Geography from Appalachian State University and then went on to receive his Masters in International Relations from the Catholic University of America and his JD from the University of Memphis.

Adcock is a practicing lawyer in Fuquay-Varina specializing in real estate, civil litigation, estate planning, and land use and zoning issues. Adcock is the manager of three separate LLCs including two real estate holding companies: ADARA Properties (a real estate holding company), Adcock & Adcock LLC, Adcock Hector Creek Farm LLC.

Adcock is a member of three chambers of commerce (Fuquay-Varina, Holly Springs, and Apex). He is a registered Republican and has voted consistently in Wake County since 2000.

== Political career ==
=== 2016 campaign for Wake County Commissioner ===
His first bid for elected office occurred in 2016 when he ran for county commissioner in “super” district B; however, the district was ruled unconstitutional in July by the 4th US district court. Adcock won the GOP primary nomination against former commissioner Phil Matthews after saying he would be more willing to work with Democrats. He also identified himself as a "fresh and positive conservative voice" for Wake County. According to the Raleigh News & Observer, Adcock was a "relative unknown in political circles."

Adcock identified raising teacher pay for teachers with advanced degrees and better equipping roads for growth as key issues when he filed to run for Wake County commissioner. He noted during the campaign, "I am a strong proponent for raising teachers' salaries to national standards and for providing incentives for teachers to seek advanced degrees." However, he opposed a 3.65-cent-per-$100 increase in the property tax rate to raise teacher pay. Instead, he preferred that school systems redirect funds from central administration to teachers.

When asked how he would combat economic inequality in Raleigh, Adcock said he would promote "economic development that provides quality employment opportunities." In the same interview, he described himself as a "strong advocate for the taxpayer," adding that "one of the most important duties of our elected officials is prudent stewardships of the tax payers' dollars."

Additionally, Adcock identified transportation as one of the biggest issues facing Wake County revolving around the impact of major growth. He campaigned on improving roads and cited "horrendous" traffic. However, Adcock later opposed the Wake transit plan, saying it would "only serve the more urban areas of our county." He explicitly stated that he did not support the transit plan or the tax increase to fund it.

When asked how he would combat illegal drugs in Wake County, Adcock said he had "upmost confidence in Sheriff Donnie Harrison." Donnie Harrison's Sheriff Department had previously fallen under scrutiny for keeping a corvette seized in a drug raid.

After the election, when the 3rd District Court ruled that the “super-districts” in Wake County were unconstitutional, Adcock expressed disappointment at the ruling and later published an op-ed in the News & Observer advocating for a combination of countywide and district-only elections for County Commissioner. He also said he disagreed with the proposition of returning to the 2011 maps.

=== 2018 campaign for North Carolina House District 37 ===
Adcock announced he would run for HD37 after Rep. Linda Hunt Williams announced that she would not seek re-election. Adcock ran against Sydney Batch. His campaign for county commissioner funded his campaign for HD37. He lost to Batch by very close margin of 50 percent to 48 percent.

== Electoral history ==
=== 2018 ===
North Carolina House of Representatives 37th district general election, 2018
Party	Candidate	Votes	%
Democratic	Sydney Batch	22,803	49.92%
Republican	John Adcock (incumbent)	21,859	47.85%
Libertarian	Guy Meilleur	1,018	2.23%
Total votes		45,680	100%
Democratic gain from Republican			

=== 2016 ===
Wake County Board of Commissioners district B Republican primary election, 2016
Party	Candidate	Votes	%
Republican	John Adcock	30,344	54.85%
Republican	Phil Matthews	24,980	45.15%
Total votes		55,324	100%

North Carolina House of Representatives
Preceded by Linda Hunt Williams	Member of the North Carolina House of Representatives from the 37th district 2018-2019	Succeeded by Sydney Batch
