= Cass Ballenger =

American politician (1926–2015)

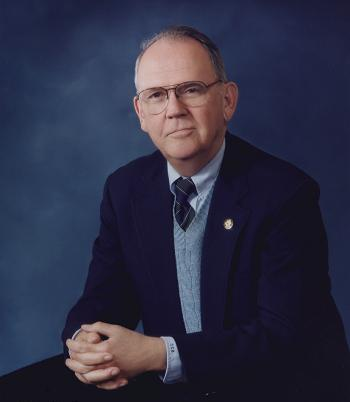

Member of the U.S. House of Representatives from North Carolina's 10th district
- In office November 4, 1986 – January 3, 2005 (Note: Ballenger's official service begins on the date of the special election, while the House was adjourned sine die until the start of the next Congress on January 3, 1987.)
- Preceded by: Jim Broyhill
- Succeeded by: Patrick McHenry

Member of the North Carolina Senate
- In office January 1, 1977 – November 4, 1986
- Preceded by: Pleas Lackey
- Succeeded by: Austin Allran
- Constituency: 23rd district (1977–1983); 26th district (1983–1986)

Member of the North Carolina House of Representatives from the 37th district
- In office January 1, 1975 – January 1, 1977
- Preceded by: Robert Quincy Beard; G. Hunter Warlick
- Succeeded by: Julius Reid Poovey

Personal details
- Born: Thomas Cass Ballenger; December 6, 1926 Hickory, North Carolina, U.S.
- Died: February 18, 2015 (aged 88) Hickory, North Carolina, U.S.
- Party: Republican
- Spouse: Donna Ballenger

Thomas Cass Ballenger (December 6, 1926 – February 18, 2015) was an American politician. A Republican, he represented North Carolina's 10th congressional district, centered in the foothills of North Carolina, in the United States House of Representatives from 1986 to 2005.

== Biography ==
Ballenger represented the 10th congressional district of North Carolina from 1986 to 2005. He was also the founder and former chairman of the board of Plastic Packaging, Inc., a manufacturing company with plants in Hickory and Forest City. He also served in the North Carolina Senate (1977–1986), the North Carolina House of Representatives (1975–1977) and on the Catawba County Board of Commissioners (1966–1974). In 38 consecutive years in elective office, serving at the local, state and federal levels, Ballenger never lost an election.

He was a member of the Republican leadership in the U.S. House of Representatives, serving as a deputy whip and as a member of the House Steering Committee. He was also a member of the board of directors of the National Council on the Arts.

During Ballenger's time in the U.S. Congress, he was a renowned expert on business issues and foreign affairs, especially on issues dealing with Central and South America. Ballenger served on the Committee on Education and the Workforce and as Chairman of the House Subcommittee on Workforce Protections. During his chairmanship, he authored legislation, which was later enacted, to reform the Occupational Safety and Health Administration (OSHA) to make it less adversarial and more collaborative while still ensuring worker safety. It was the first major legislative revision to OSHA workplace rules since the agency was created.

Other notable legislation Ballenger authored included a bill making the use of hypodermic needles safer for healthcare workers and a bill to designate Wilson Creek in Caldwell County a Wild and Scenic River. He secured major funding for the completion of US321 between Hickory and Gastonia, and also established the Future Forward Economic Alliance, a regional economic development initiative serving 11 counties in western North Carolina. Through Future Forward, Ballenger led the effort to secure funding to create the North Carolina Center for Engineering Technologies in Hickory. He was also instrumental in the creation of the Hickory Metro Higher Education Center (now the Appalachian State University Center at Hickory.)

He also served on the International Relations Committee and as Chairman of the Western Hemisphere Subcommittee, where he worked to promote democracy and human rights, fight poverty and improve relations with developing countries in Central and South America.

In 1990, he and his wife Donna founded the Ballenger Foundation to continue their longtime charitable work in Central America. They established several medical clinics in high-poverty locations, sponsored an orphanage, sent school furniture and textbooks and delivered loads of other relief supplies. Their efforts began after the devastating earthquake in Managua, Nicaragua, in 1972 and continued for decades thereafter.

Ballenger prioritized constituent service in the U.S. House of Representatives. A Comprehensive Guide to Constituent Service, his benchmark publication, is still updated for each new Congress and used to train new congressional staff members.

As a member of the North Carolina Senate and former Minority Leader, he introduced the government in the Sunshine Act of 1976, which was enacted into law. It was the first substantive Open Meetings law enacted in North Carolina. He also authored legislation, known as the Ridge Law, to protect scenic vistas in the North Carolina mountains. He was recognized as the Most Effective Republican Legislator by the North Carolina Institute of Government in 1981.

Ballenger previously served as Chairman of the Catawba County Board of Commissioners and was recognized as North Carolina's County Commissioner of the Year in 1974. Both Catawba Memorial Hospital (now Catawba Valley Medical Center) and Catawba Valley Community College (formerly Catawba Valley Technical Institute) were established during his two terms as a County Commissioner.

He was at one time Chairman of the Catawba County Republican Party and also served on the Jim Martin for Governor Steering Committee; the North Carolina Reagan-Bush Campaign (Western Co-Chairman, 1984); and was a co-founder and former chairman of the North Carolina Legislative Forum.

He was active in many community organizations, including the Community Ridge Day Care Center in Hickory (co-founder); Greater Hickory United Fund (Chairman); Western Piedmont Council of Governments (Board Chairman); Greater Hickory Chamber of Commerce (Director); the North Carolina School of the Arts (Sustaining Member); the North Carolina Symphony (Patron) and the North Carolina Arts Society (Patron).

He also served on the board of development and board of directors at Lenoir-Rhyne College; the board of directors for the Salvation Army and the board of trustees for the Florence Crittenton Home.

After graduating from Episcopal High School in Alexandria, Virginia, he attended the University of North Carolina and later received a liberal arts degree from Amherst College in Amherst, Massachusetts, where he was initiated into the Delta Kappa Epsilon (DKE) fraternity. He served in the U.S. Naval Air Corps during World War II. He also volunteered as a lay reader for the Episcopal Diocese of Western North Carolina, traveling to lead services in parishes without rectors. He was a longtime active member of the Episcopal Church of the Ascension in Hickory.

Ballenger retired in 2004 and was succeeded by one-term Republican state representative Patrick McHenry.

Ballenger died on February 18, 2015, aged 88.

Ballenger was the great-great-grandson of Lewis Cass, a former U.S. senator, Secretary of State, and Democratic presidential nominee in 1848.

North Carolina House of Representatives
Preceded by Robert Quincy Beard; G. Hunter Warlick	Member of the North Carolina House of Representatives from the 37th district 1975–1977	Succeeded by Julius Reid Poovey
North Carolina Senate
Preceded by Pleas Lackey	Member of the North Carolina Senate from the 23rd district 1977–1983; Served alongside: Bobby Lee Combs, William Walter Redman Jr.	Succeeded by Jack Cely Childers; Robert Monroe Davis
Preceded by James McClure Clarke; Robert Stringfield Swain	Member of the North Carolina Senate from the 26th district 1983–1986; Served alongside: William Walter Redman Jr.	Succeeded by Austin Allran
U.S. House of Representatives
Preceded by Jim Broyhill	Member of the U.S. House of Representatives from North Carolina's 10th congressional district November 4, 1986 – January 3, 2005	Succeeded by Patrick McHenry
