= Linda Hunt Williams =

American politician

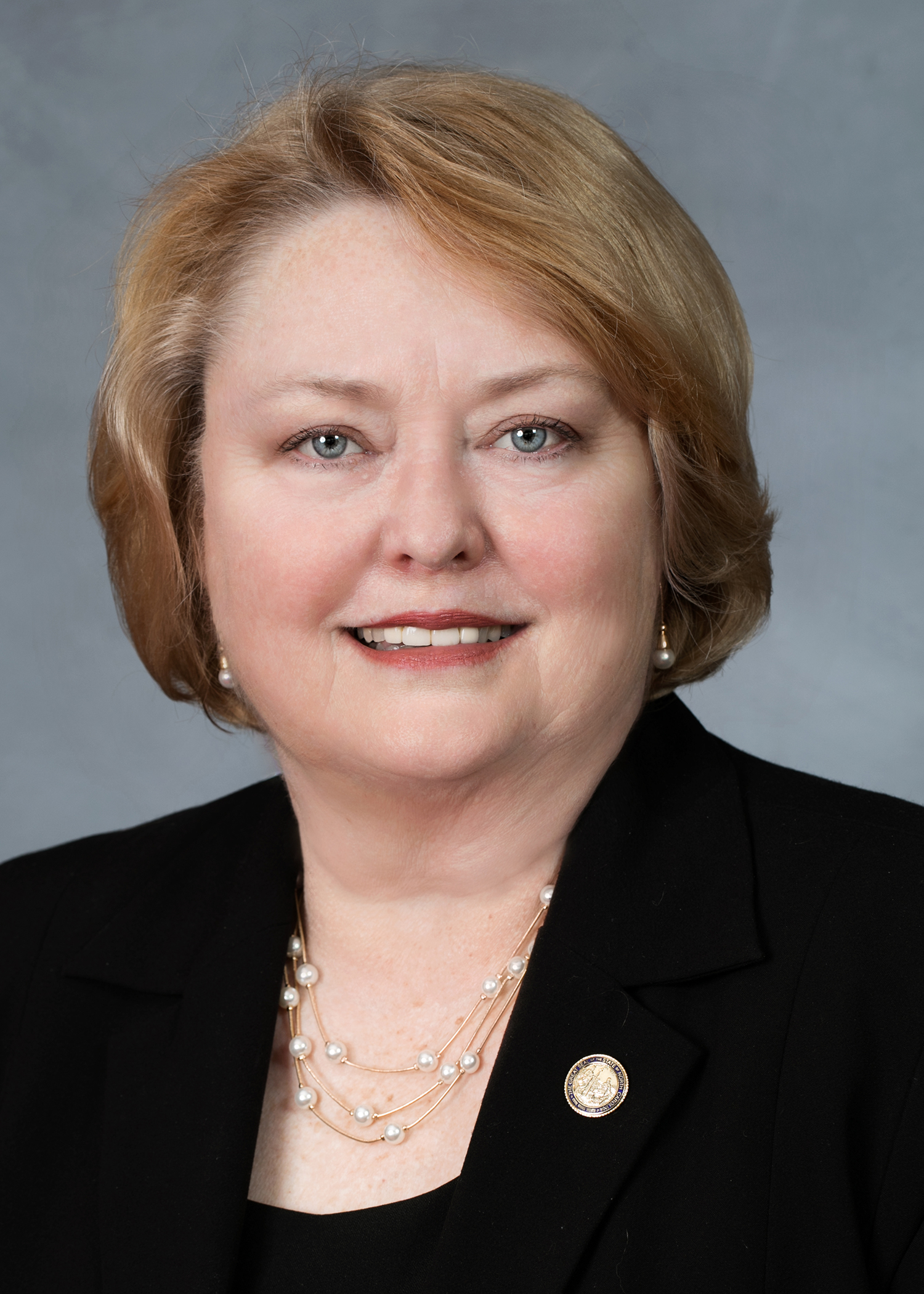

Member of the North Carolina House of Representatives from the 37th district
- In office January 1, 2017 – August 31, 2018
- Preceded by: Paul Stam
- Succeeded by: John Adcock

Personal details
- Born: August 12, 1948 (age 77) New Orleans, Louisiana
- Party: Republican
- Occupation: Not-for-profit developer, consultant

Linda Hunt Williams (born August 12, 1948) is an American politician. She was elected to the North Carolina House of Representatives in 2016 and she served from 2017 until her resignation on August 31, 2018. A Republican, she represented the 37th district (based in southern Wake County).

== Honors ==
In 2018, Williams was listed as a Champion of the Family in the NC Values Coalition Scorecard.

== Committee assignments ==
- Commerce and Job Development
- Education - Community Colleges
- Finance
- Homeland Security, Military, and Veterans Affairs
- Homelessness, Foster Care, and Dependency
- State and Local Government II

== Electoral history ==
North Carolina House of Representatives 37th district general election, 2016
Party	Candidate	Votes	%
Republican	Linda Hunt Williams	27,448	52.29%
Democratic	Randy Barrow	22,569	43.00%
Libertarian	Robert Rose	2,474	4.71%
Total votes		52,491	100%
Republican hold			

North Carolina House of Representatives
Preceded by Paul Stam	Member of the North Carolina House of Representatives from the 37th district 2017-2018	Succeeded by John Adcock
