= Apex Friendship High School =

American public school in North Carolina

Location
- 7801 Humie Olive Road; Apex, North Carolina 27502; United States; 35.7019°N 78.9107°W

Information
- Type: Public
- Established: 2015 (11 years ago)
- CEEB code: 340088
- Principal: Brian Pittman
- Teaching staff: 134.74 (on an FTE basis)
- Grades: 9–12
- Enrollment: 2,761 (2023–2024)
- Student to teacher ratio: 20.49
- Colors: Blue, Red and White
- Athletics: NCHSAA 8A
- Athletics conference: Quad City Seven 8A
- Mascot: Patriots
- Feeder schools: Apex Friendship Middle School, Apex Middle School, Lufkin Road Middle School, Salem Middle School, Holly Ridge Middle School
- Website: Apex Friendship High School

Apex Friendship High School, often referred to as AFHS, is a public high school located in the southwestern corner of Apex, North Carolina near the small community of Friendship, North Carolina. The school was founded in 2015 and is part of the Wake County Public School System.

== History ==
Apex Friendship High School opened at the start of the 2015–2016 school year, to ninth and tenth graders only. During the 2016–2017 school year, it added 11th graders, and the following year in 2017–2018, the school graduated its first senior class.

== Naming ==
The naming of Apex Friendship High School was highly controversial before its opening in 2015. The school board had initially planned to call the school 'West Apex High School' after a vote in 2011, but local Friendship residents, many of whom are minorities, wanted the school to pay tribute to the area's history by including the word ‘Friendship’ in its name. In 2013, the Wake County School Board retracted its 2011 decision, in favor of the current name Apex Friendship High School, to accommodate these residents’ wishes.

After the naming decision, the school board received criticism from many of the incoming students, parents, and staff. Some thought the name 'West Apex' would help students feel more connected, rather than the name Friendship. Others in favor of the name of 'Friendship' thought it would help acknowledge the communities roots. There were two online petitions with hundreds of signatures for each, but the ultimate decision by the school board set in place the name Apex Friendship High School.

== Athletics ==
Apex Friendship High School is a member of the North Carolina High School Athletic Association (NCHSAA) and are classified as a 8A school. The school is a part of the Quad City Seven 8A Conference. The school's team name is the Patriots, with the school colors being blue, red, and white.

== Notable alumni ==
- Macey Bader, professional soccer player
- Marz Josephson, professional soccer player
- Indya Nivar, WNBA player
