= Apex Town Hall (historic) =

Historic town hall in Apex, North Carolina

- Apex City Hall
- U.S. National Register of Historic Places
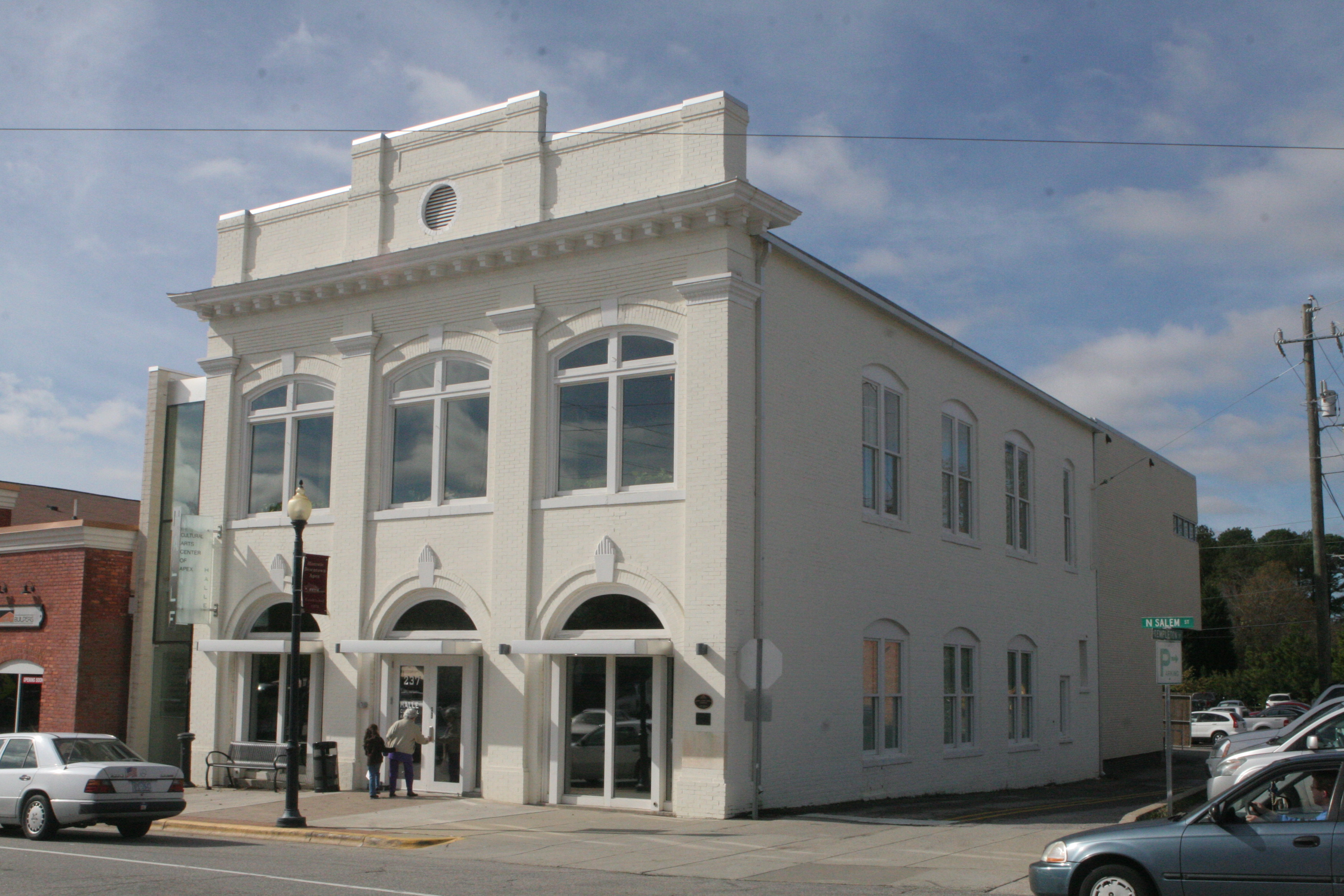
- The Historic Apex Town Hall now houses the Halle Cultural Arts Center

- Location within North Carolina Location within the United States
- Location: Apex, North Carolina
- Coordinates: 35°43′58″N 78°51′02″W
- Built: 1912
- NRHP reference No.: 85003077
- Added to NRHP: December 5, 1985

The Apex Town Hall, called Apex City Hall in the National Register of Historic Places is a historic town hall at 237 N Salem Street in the historic district of downtown Apex, North Carolina. It was built in 1912 after the June 12, 1911, fire destroyed several downtown buildings including the previous home of the town hall, Poe Brother's Store.

The ground floor housed a farmer's market with fresh meat preserved by ice boxes, vegetables, chickens on the sidewalk out front, and two jail cells, segregated by race. Upstairs had an auditorium, opera stage, dressing rooms and the mayor's office. The building was heated by wood stoves and lighted by oil lamps.

The auditorium hosted silent movies, Chautauquas, dramas, and other community cultural events.

The Apex Volunteer Fire Department was formed in 1927 and took its first residence the town hall, parking a fire engine in the left bay of the building, which parked there through 1957. The Fire Department built a separate building across the street in 1958.

Apex had a public works building attached to the back for a time, but it was removed to make parking spaces.

The DMV had an office in the building for a time.

The Town Hall function moved from the building in 1978 to 205 Saunders St. The building was condemned. The town refurbished it and it served as home to the Apex Parks and Recreation department through 2007.

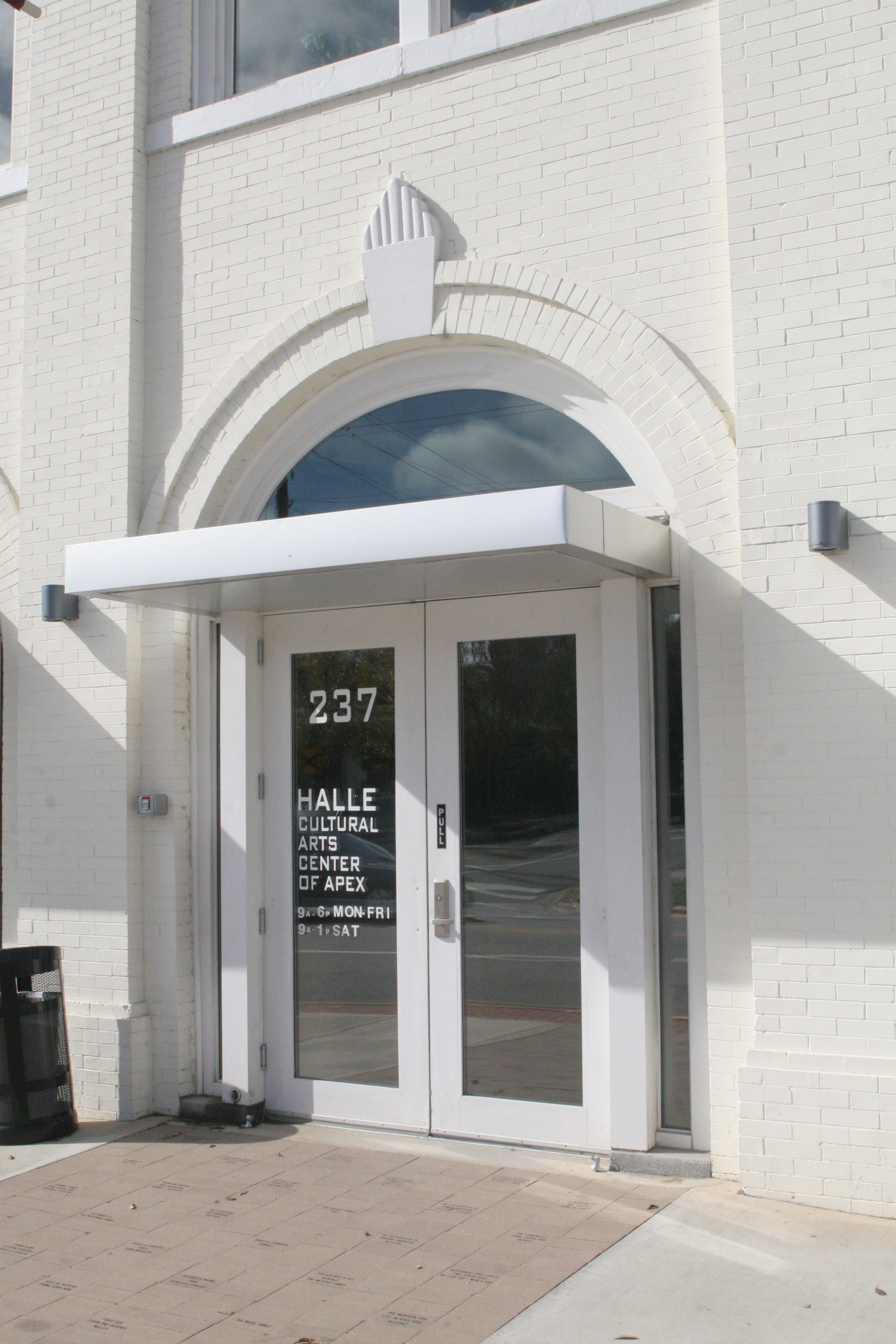
The arches on the front sport a decorative capstone. The town still occupies the building, now with a cultural arts center.

== Halle Cultural Arts Center ==
The Halle Cultural Arts Center has occupied the building since dedication January 10, 2008. It offers an art gallery downstairs and a performance hall upstairs, with the original flooring from the original auditorium.

Additions to the building include a glass-enclosed grand staircase and elevator on the south side and an extension on the back.

The renovations were recognized by the AIA-Triangle Merit Award and the 2008 Anthemion Award from Capital Area Preservation.

== See also ==
- Apex Historic District
- List of Registered Historic Places in North Carolina
