= Utley-Council House =

Historic house in North Carolina, United States

- U.S. National Register of Historic Places
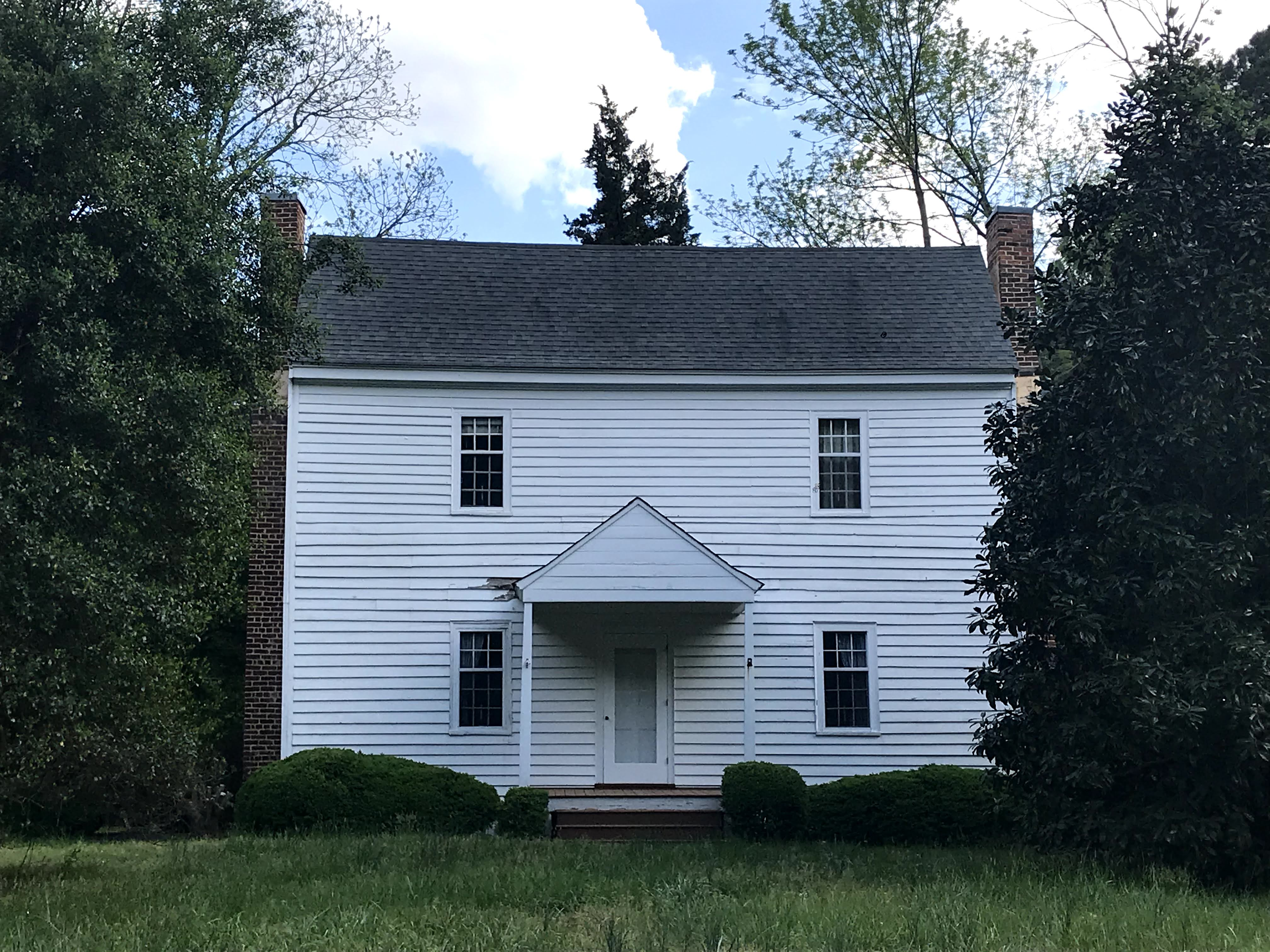

- Location within North Carolina Location within the United States
- Location: 4009 Optimist Farm Road (0.4 miles west of the junction between NC 1390 and NC 1387 on the south side of the road), Apex, North Carolina
- Coordinates: 35°39′48″N 78°46′2″W
- Area: 2 acres (0.81 ha)
- Built: c. 1820
- Architectural style: Federal
- MPS: Wake County MPS
- NRHP reference No.: 02000498
- Added to NRHP: May 16, 2002

Utley-Council House is a historic home located near Apex, Wake County, North Carolina. It was built about 1820, and is an asymmetrical, two-story, three-bay, frame Federal period dwelling. It has a hall-and-parlor plan. Also on the property is a contributing mortise-and-tenon smokehouse (c. 1820s).

It was listed on the National Register of Historic Places (NRHP) in 2002.
