= Calvin Wray Lawrence House =

Historic house in North Carolina, United States

- U.S. National Register of Historic Places
- Location within North Carolina Location within the United States
- Location: 8528 Ragan Rd., near Apex, North Carolina
- Coordinates: 35°43′7″N 78°56′24″W
- Area: 6.7 acres (2.7 ha)
- Built: c. 1880
- Architectural style: I-house
- MPS: Wake County MPS
- NRHP reference No.: 08000937
- Added to NRHP: September 23, 2008

Calvin Wray Lawrence House is a historic home located near Apex, Wake County, North Carolina. The house was built about 1890, and is a two-story, three-bay, single-pile frame I-house with a central hall plan. It has a triple-A-roof; full-width, hip-roof front porch; and a two-story addition and two-story gabled rear ell. Also on the property are the contributing well house, outhouse, and storage barn.

It was listed on the National Register of Historic Places in 2008.
