= Apex Historic District =

Historic district in North Carolina, United States

- U.S. National Register of Historic Places
- U.S. Historic district
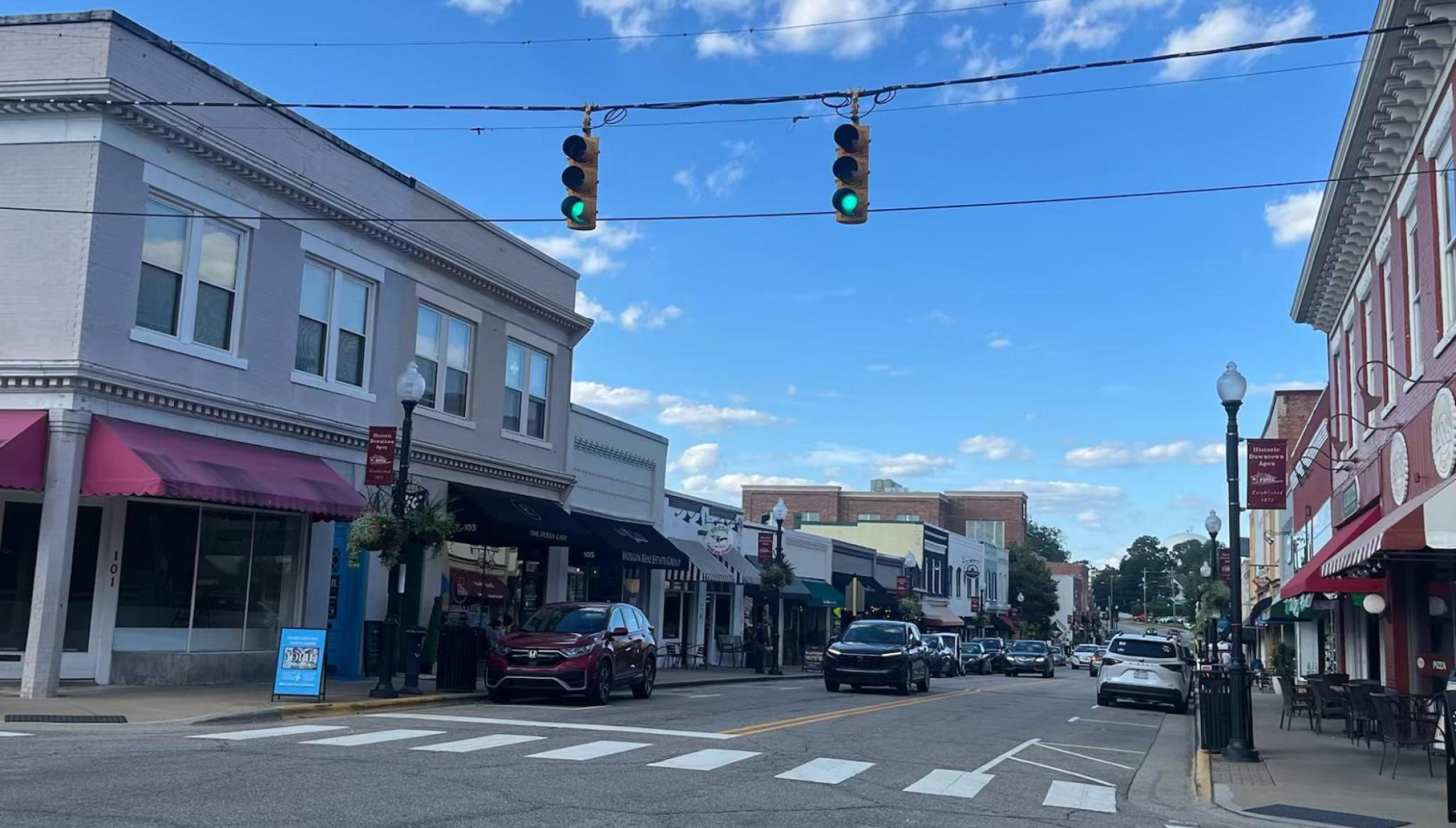
- Historic downtown Apex

- Location within North Carolina Location within the United States
- Location: Apex, North Carolina
- Built: 1873
- Architect: Frank B. Simpson, J.W. Stout, others
- Architectural style: Bungalow/Craftsman, Queen Anne, Classical Revival, Italianate, Modern Movement, Late Victorian, Early Commercial
- MPS: Wake County MPS
- NRHP reference No.: 94000185 (original); 95000210 (increase 1); 02000016 (increase 2); 07001502 (increase 3)

Significant dates
- Added to NRHP: March 17, 1994
- Boundary increases: March 10, 1995; February 14, 2002; January 31, 2008

The Apex Historic District is the historic commercial and residential center of Apex, North Carolina, a satellite town of the state capital Raleigh. The district revolves around Salem Street, the main thoroughfare in downtown Apex. In 2007, CNNMoney.com ranked Apex as the 14th best place to live in the United States. The report cited the Historic District as one reason for the award and described the district as "quaint, impressively intact, and with an array of commercial and residential buildings now serving visitors and residents alike." On March 17, 1994, the Apex Historic District was listed on the National Register of Historic Places. The district boundaries were expanded in 1995, 2002, and 2008, and include Hunter, Center, Chatham, Cunningham, Holleman, and Hughes Streets.

== History ==
The town of Apex was incorporated in 1873, and named for being the highest point on the Chatham Railroad line between Richmond, Virginia and Jacksonville, Florida. The town's residential and commercial buildings were constructed near the Apex Union Depot on Salem Street. During the next several decades, Apex became the rail, trade, and shopping destination for western Wake County. In February 1905, a fire broke out in the commercial area of downtown Apex and destroyed several frame buildings. Owners rebuilt their businesses with fire-proof brick. On June 12, 1911, another fire broke out in Apex's commercial district. The Merchants and Farmer's Bank, Postmaster's house, and many other buildings were destroyed. Townspeople once again rebuilt downtown Apex businesses and a new train station was constructed in 1914.

Like many small U.S. towns, downtown Apex businesses began closing in the 1970s and 1980s. By 1985, half of the buildings in downtown Apex were empty. In 1995 town leaders began improving Salem Street in an effort to increase local business and attract visitors to the historic district. Utilities were placed underground, sidewalks were repaved, and landscaping was added. In 1996, Apex received an award from Wake County's Capital Area Preservation organization for the efforts put forth in revitalizing the historic district. Because of Apex's population boom (1990 population: 4,500; 2008 estimated population: 34,000), further development of the district has begun and includes additional office space, a hotel, theatre, churches, six parks, and over 800 homes.

== Architecture ==
Apex Historic District contains 60 buildings that were constructed from 1870 to 1940, and has been described as a "Gucci Mayberry." Architectural designs of the district include: Bungalow, Craftsman, Queen Anne, Classical Revival, Italianate, Modern Movement, Late Victorian, and Early Commercial. Salem Street is lined with one-and two-story brick buildings, such as the Town Hall and the Union Depot The retail section of the district includes art galleries, bakeries, restaurants, and boutique stores.

== See also ==
- National Register of Historic Places listings in Wake County, North Carolina
