= Julia Montgomery Street =

American poet

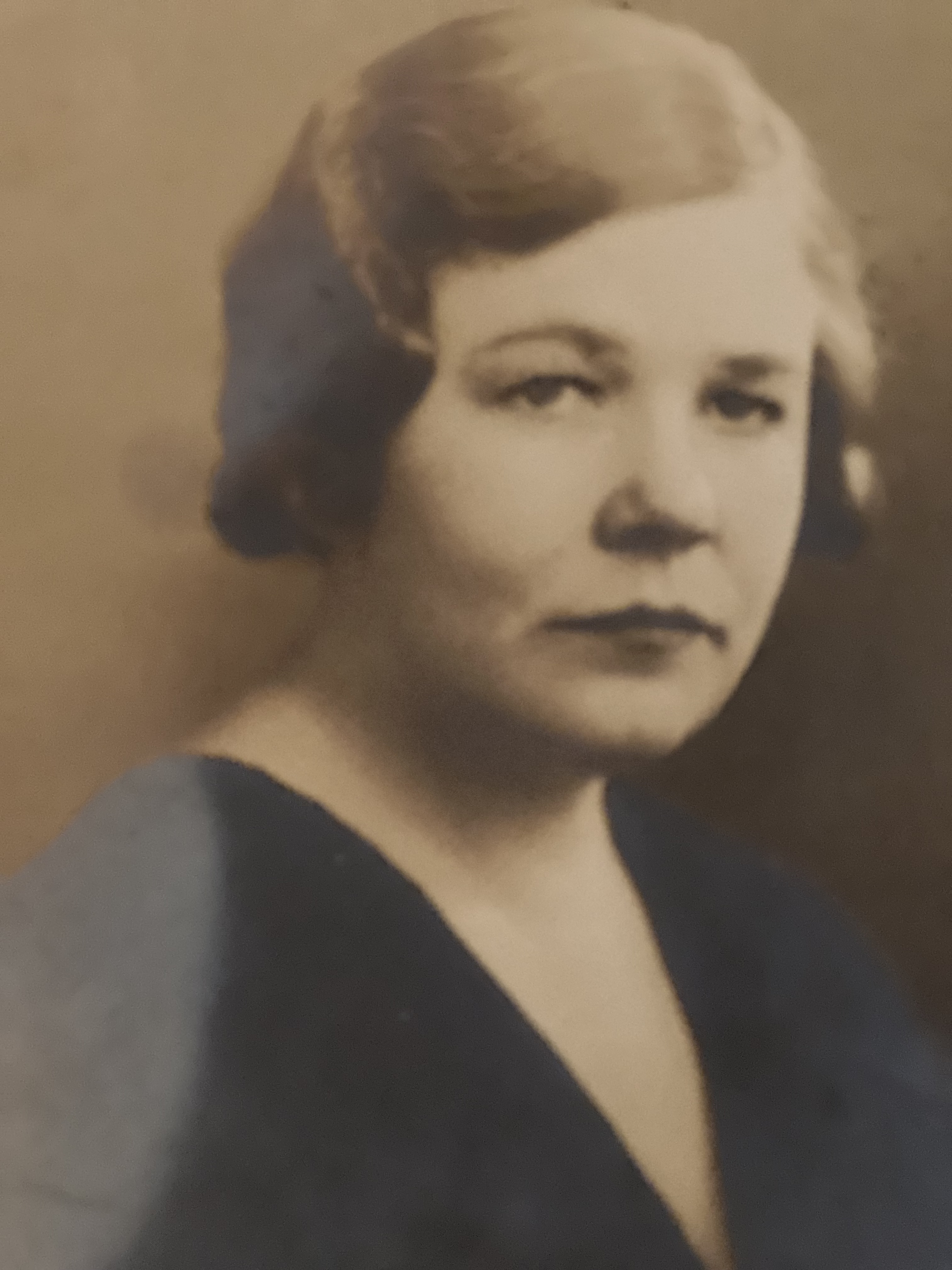

Julia Montgomery Street (January 19, 1898 – September 1993) was an American poet, playwright and author.

== Biography ==
Street was born in Concord, North Carolina and was raised in Apex and Raleigh. She graduated from Woman's College, now the University of North Carolina at Greensboro, in 1923 with a degree in English. She went on to complete graduate studies in child psychology at the University of North Carolina at Chapel Hill. She taught elementary school and summer school courses at Woman's College, and briefly worked for the Children's Home Society of North Carolina. In 1924, she married Dr. C. A. Street. Dr. Claudius Augustus Street was a pediatrician in Winston Salem, North Carolina.

== Career ==
After her two children, Carol Montgomery Street McMillan and Claudius Augustus Street Jr., entered school, Street began writing poetry, children's stories, journal articles, and radio plays. Her short story "Hoecake and Buttermilk" was published in 1939. Her first children's novel, Fiddler's Fancy," was published in 1955. Street's other works include: Moccasin Tracks (1955), Candle Love Feast (1959), Drover's Gold (1961), Dulcie's Whale (1963), North Carolina Parade: Stories of History and People (1966) and Judaculla's Handprint (1976). Many of her stories were based on carefully researched North Carolina historical subjects. Street died in 1993. Street's writing is featured in Our Words Our Ways: Reading and Writing in North Carolina by Sally Buckner. "Sequoyah's Gift" from Moccasin Tracks is the featured story. It is found on page 100. She is also featured in Something About the Author/ Vol 11/ Commire on page 218. Street is cited in Contemporary Authors Gale Research, vol 5-6 on page 397. and vols 5-8 First Revision on page 1108. A still active book club in Apex, North Carolina, is named for her: 'The Julia Montgomery Street Book Club,"

== Awards and honors ==
- American Association of University Women Juvenile Literature Award. North Carolina
- 1956 "Fiddler's Fancy"
- 1963 "Dulcie's Whale"
- 1966 "North Carolina Parade: Stories of History and People" (with Richard Walser)
- North Carolina Historian of the Year West, awarded posthumously in November 1993
