= Safiyah Jackson =

American politician and early childhood education administrator

Member of the Wake County Board of Commissioners from the 2nd district
- Incumbent
- Assumed office February 2025
- Preceded by: Matt Calabria

Personal details
- Party: Democratic
- Education: Florida A&M University; National Louis University (M.Ed)
- Occupation: Early childhood education administrator, politician

Safiyah Jackson (born 1977 or 1978) is an American politician and early childhood education administrator serving as a member of the Wake County Board of Commissioners for the 2nd district since 2025. A member of the Democratic Party, she was appointed to the board in August 2025 to fill a vacancy and was elected vice chair of the board later that year. She won election to a full term in 2026.

Jackson worked for two decades in early childhood education and nonprofit administration in Chicago and North Carolina. In 2024, she was the Democratic nominee for the North Carolina House of Representatives in District 37, losing to incumbent Erin Paré.

== Early life and education ==
Jackson earned her Bachelor of Science degree in Business Administration and a Master of Business Administration in Marketing from Florida A&M University. She received a Master of Education (M.Ed) in early childhood administration and educational psychology from National Louis University.

== Career ==
=== Early childhood education and nonprofit work ===
Jackson began her career as a zone manager at the Ford Motor Company from 2001 to 2007. She then moved into arts, culture, and education administration in Chicago, serving as an education fellow at The Chicago Community Trust and as an assistant director of education and later director of learning programs at the Shedd Aquarium. From 2012 to 2018, Jackson worked at the McCormick Center for Early Childhood Leadership, first as director of training and later as a program officer for early childhood education. She also served as an adjunct professor at National Louis University from 2016 to 2017.

In 2018, Jackson joined the North Carolina Partnership for Children, a statewide early childhood organization, as early childhood systems director. She became the organization's chief strategy officer in 2020, working with a statewide network of county-based early childhood organizations.

=== 2024 North Carolina House of Representatives campaign ===
In 2024, Jackson ran as the Democratic nominee for the North Carolina House of Representatives in District 37, which includes Fuquay-Varina and parts of Holly Springs and Garner in southern Wake County. Her campaign centered on education and early childhood development. The district was considered one of a handful of competitive races that could affect the Republican supermajority in the state House.

In the general election on November 5, 2024, incumbent Republican Erin Paré defeated Jackson and Libertarian candidate Christopher Robinson. Paré received 51.5% of the vote to Jackson's 45.2%.

=== Wake County Board of Commissioners ===
The Wake County Democrats nominated Jackson in January 2025 to fill the open District 2 seat created when Matt Calabria resigned to lead Governor Josh Stein's recovery office in Western North Carolina. In February, the Wake County Board of Commissioners unanimously appointed Jackson to represent the district. She was sworn in the same day as the board's approval vote. Upon taking office, Jackson said she took the seat "as an advocate for the early years," arguing that a strong community "starts with happy kids, good schools and support for families and teachers."

In December 2025, the board elected Jackson as vice chair for 2026, alongside chair Don Mial. As a commissioner, she chairs the board's Affordable Housing Committee and is a liaison to the Wake County Housing Authority and Passage Home boards. Jackson was unopposed in the Democratic primary for a full term in 2026, and went on to win the general election in 2026.

== Personal life ==
Jackson lives in unincorporated Wake County, in the Raleigh, North Carolina metropolitan area. She has described herself as the granddaughter of a domestic worker and as having grown up in a family with working parents. She is involved in the Raleigh Little Theatre and has said that her personal interests include theater, live jazz, community festivals, and children's literature.
