= Jim Broyhill =

American politician (1927–2023)

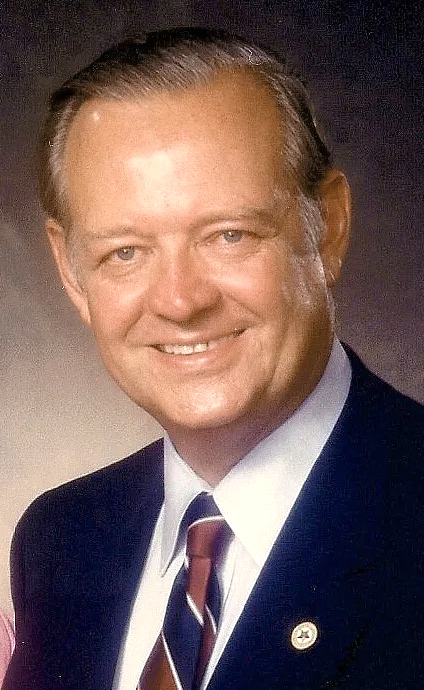
- Official portrait, 1986

Secretary of Commerce of North Carolina
- In office 1989–1990
- Governor: James G. Martin
- Preceded by: Claude E. Pope
- Succeeded by: Estell C. Lee

United States Senator from North Carolina
- In office July 14, 1986 – November 4, 1986
- Appointed by: James G. Martin
- Preceded by: John P. East
- Succeeded by: Terry Sanford

Member of the U.S. House of Representatives from North Carolina
- In office January 3, 1963 – July 14, 1986
- Preceded by: Hugh Quincy Alexander
- Succeeded by: Cass Ballenger
- Constituency: 9th district (1963–1969); 10th district (1969–1986)

Personal details
- Born: James Thomas Broyhill; August 19, 1927 Lenoir, North Carolina, U.S.
- Died: February 18, 2023 (aged 95) Winston-Salem, North Carolina, U.S.
- Party: Republican
- Spouse: Louise Robbins (m. 1951)
- Children: 3
- Parent: James Edgar Broyhill (father)
- Education: University of North Carolina at Chapel Hill
- Profession: Businessman

James Thomas "Jim" Broyhill (August 19, 1927 – February 18, 2023) was an American businessman and politician who served as a member of the United States House of Representatives from 1963 to 1986 and briefly served in the United States Senate in 1986. He represented much of the Foothills region of the state in the U.S. House of Representatives from 1963 to 1986, and served in the U.S. Senate for nearly four months in 1986. He had a career in the furniture industry before entering politics.

== Biography ==
Broyhill was born in Lenoir, North Carolina, the second youngest of four children born to furniture magnate James Edgar Broyhill and the former Satie Hunt. The senior Broyhill was a member of the Republican National Committee for 28 years. However, for most of that time the party was sparsely supported within the Southern United States, including North Carolina. After attending the University of North Carolina at Chapel Hill, Jim Broyhill joined his father's company in 1945 and served in various capacities there until 1962. He was also active in several state industry associations, as well as a civic leader in Lenoir.

=== U.S. House of Representatives ===
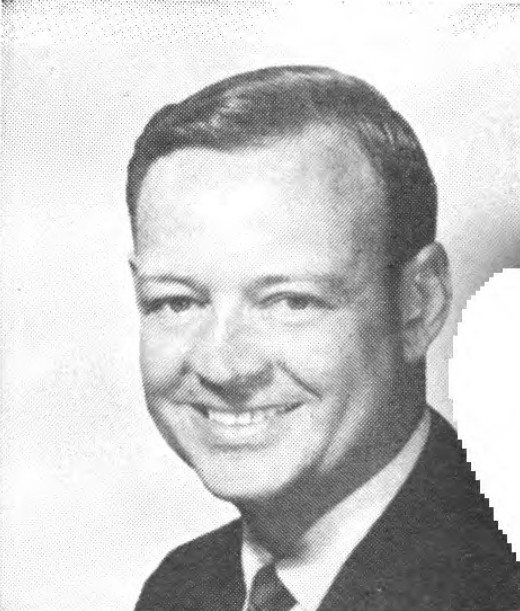
Jim Broyhill in 1971 as U.S. Representative

Broyhill believed there needed to be a more competitive election landscape in North Carolina, and that he could play a role in strengthening the Republican Party by running for office himself.

Broyhill made his first run for elected office in 1962 for North Carolina's 9th congressional district. Broyhill was the unexpected beneficiary of redistricting after the 1960 census, which cost North Carolina a congressional district. The Democratic-controlled North Carolina General Assembly saw a chance to get rid of the then lone Republican in the congressional delegation, Charles R. Jonas of the Charlotte, North Carolina area, by re-drawing his district from under him. In the process, they shifted some strongly Republican areas into the 9th, a district where growing Republican influence had kept five-term Democratic Party member Hugh Quincy Alexander from establishing a foothold. At the same time, they shifted some strongly Democratic areas of the 9th into the new 8th district designed to defeat Jonas. However, the plan backfired disastrously when Jonas handily defeated 8th district incumbent A. Paul Kitchin and Broyhill defeated Alexander by just under one percentage point in an upset.

Broyhill never faced another contest nearly that close again. Due to his very conservative stances on nearly all issues and an emphasis on taking good care of his constituents (most of whom had never been represented by a Republican before), he became very popular in his district. He won reelection by 11 points in the midst of the gigantic Democratic landslide victory of 1964, in which Lyndon B. Johnson carried 87 of North Carolina's 100 counties. Broyhill won reelection 10 times thereafter, never receiving less than 54 percent of the vote and only winning by less than 10 points twice in what became the most Republican district in North Carolina. His district was renumbered the 10th in 1969.

A highlight of his long service in the House was his leadership role in creating the U.S. Consumer Product Safety Commission.

==== U.S. Senate ====
On June 29, 1986, U.S. Senate member John P. East, who was not seeking re-election, committed suicide. Broyhill already had won the Republican nomination for the race to succeed East, and Governor of North Carolina James G. Martin appointed Broyhill to the seat for the remainder of the term. The plan was to give Broyhill an incumbency advantage over the Democratic nominee, former governor of North Carolina Terry Sanford. However, Sanford narrowly defeated Broyhill in November and took office immediately.

=== Later career ===
Broyhill later served as chairman of the North Carolina Economic Development Commission and then as secretary of the North Carolina Department of Commerce.

He retired from politics in 1991 but was appointed to the board of trustees of Appalachian State University two years later.

Broyhill was inducted into the North Carolina Republican Party Hall of Fame and the Lenoir, North Carolina Post Office was renamed in his honor. At the time of his death, he resided in Winston-Salem, North Carolina with his wife of 71 years, Louise Robbins Broyhill, who he married in June 1951. He had a daughter, Marilyn Beach, and two sons, Ed and Phillip (died March 1, 2014). His daughter Marilyn and his son Ed also resided in Winston-Salem. He had six grandchildren. His son Ed was a candidate for the Republican nomination in the 5th congressional district in 2004.

=== Death ===
Broyhill died at Arbor Acres United Methodist Retirement Community from complications of congestive heart failure in Winston-Salem, North Carolina, on February 18, 2023, age 95.

== Works cited ==
- Covington, Howard E.; Ellis, Marion A., eds. (2002). The North Carolina Century: Tar Heels who Made a Difference, 1900–2000. Levine Museum of the New South. ISBN 9780807827574.

Party political offices
Preceded by John P. East	Republican nominee for U.S. Senator from North Carolina (Class 3); 1986 (special and regular)	Succeeded by Lauch Faircloth
U.S. House of Representatives
Preceded by Hugh Quincy Alexander	Member of the U.S. House of Representatives from North Carolina's 9th congressional district January 3, 1963 – January 3, 1969	Succeeded by Charles R. Jonas
Preceded by Basil Whitener	Member of the U.S. House of Representatives from North Carolina's 10th congressional district January 3, 1969 – July 14, 1986	Succeeded by Cass Ballenger
U.S. Senate
Preceded by John P. East	U.S. senator (Class 3) from North Carolina; July 14, 1986 – November 4, 1986; Served alongside: Jesse Helms	Succeeded by Terry Sanford
