= Sydney Batch =

American politician

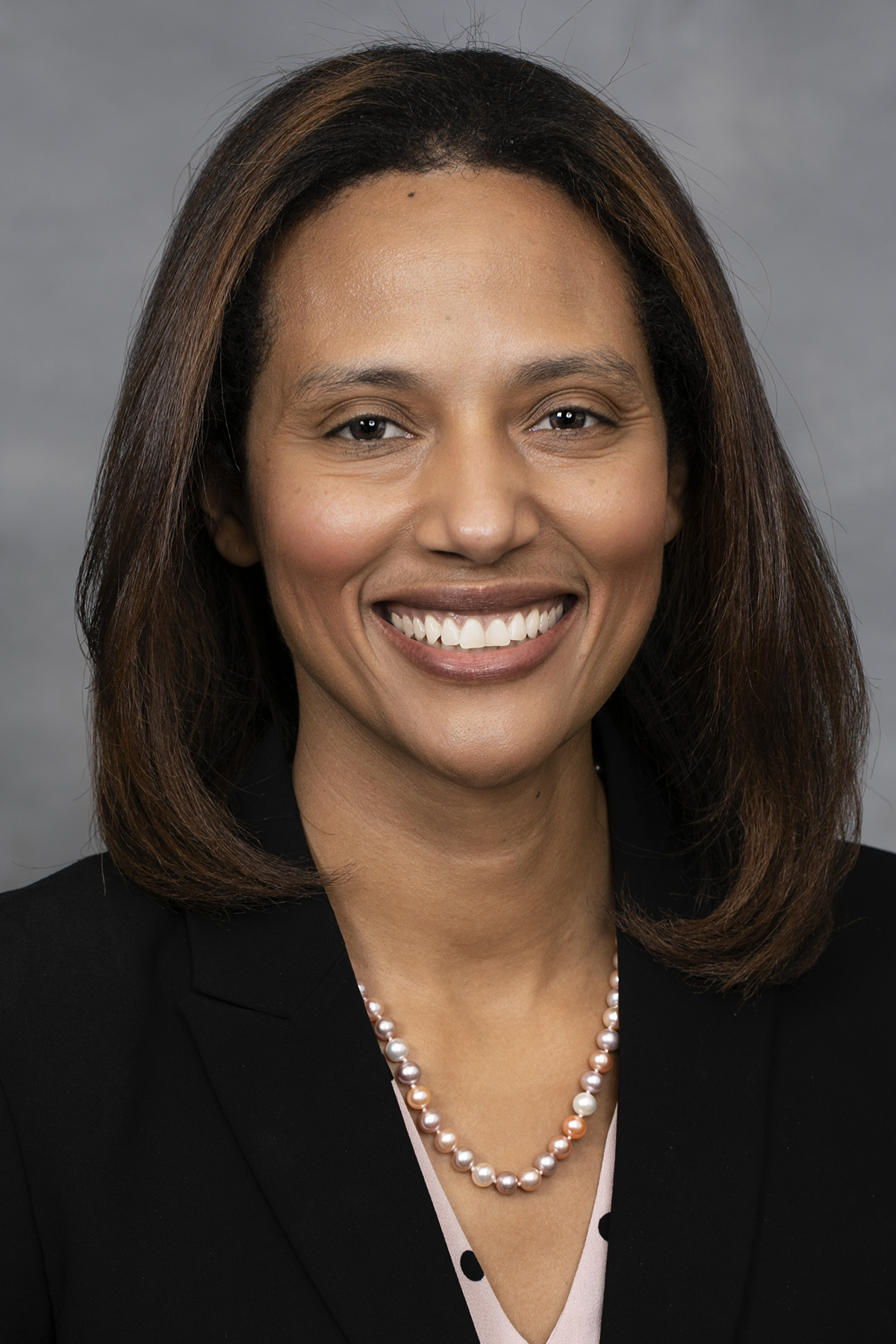

Minority Leader of the North Carolina Senate
- Incumbent
- Assumed office January 1, 2025
- Preceded by: Dan Blue

Member of the North Carolina Senate from the 17th district
- Incumbent
- Assumed office January 11, 2021
- Preceded by: Sam Searcy

Member of the North Carolina House of Representatives from the 37th district
- In office January 1, 2019 – January 1, 2021
- Preceded by: John Adcock
- Succeeded by: Erin Paré

Personal details
- Born: March 1, 1979 (age 47) Chapel Hill, North Carolina, U.S.
- Party: Democratic
- Spouse: Patrick
- Education: University of North Carolina, Chapel Hill (BA, JD, MSW)
- Website: Campaign website

Sydney Jeanene Batch (born March 1, 1979) is an American politician who is a Democratic member of the North Carolina General Assembly, representing the state's 17th Senate district since 2021 and formerly represented the State's 37th House district from 2019 until 2021.

She has served as the Minority Leader of the North Carolina Senate since 2025.

== Education and legal career ==
Batch received her B.A. Degree in English, her Juris Doctor Degree, and a master's degree in social work all from the University of North Carolina at Chapel Hill.

Batch has practiced law since 2005 at her firm in Raleigh, North Carolina. Batch practices divorce law, child custody law, and child welfare law. In 2019, Batch was recognized by Super Lawyers as a top attorney in family law in Raleigh, North Carolina.

== Political career ==
Batch defeated John Adcock in the November 2018 general election. Batch won by a margin of 50 percent to 48 percent. She lost her 2020 reelection race to Erin Pare. On January 11, 2021, Batch was appointed to the North Carolina Senate for District 17. She was elected as minority leader in December 2024, replacing senator Dan Blue.

In 2025, Batch proposed a bill to provide coverage parity for breast cancer diagnostic imaging. She had herself been diagnosed with breast cancer several years earlier, at the age of 39.

== Election history ==
=== 2024 ===
N.C. Senate 17th district General Election
Party	Candidate	Votes	%
Democratic	Sydney Batch	71,610	74.38%
Libertarian	Patrick J. Bowersox	24,661	25.62%
Total votes		96,271	100%

=== 2022 ===
N.C. Senate 17th district General Election
Party	Candidate	Votes	%
Democratic	Sydney Batch (incumbent)	45,279	51.83%
Republican	Mark Cavaliero	40,167	45.97%
Libertarian	Patrick J. Bowersox	1,922	2.20%
Total votes		87,368	100%

=== 2020 ===
N.C. House of Representatives 37th district General Election
Party	Candidate	Votes	%
Republican	Erin Paré	35,136	50.06%
Democratic	Sydney Batch (incumbent)	32,842	46.79%
Libertarian	Liam Leaver	2,208	3.15%
Total votes		70,186	100%
Republican gain from Democratic			

=== 2018 ===
N.C. House of Representatives 37th district General Election
Party	Candidate	Votes	%
Democratic	Sydney Batch	22,803	49.92%
Republican	John Adcock	21,859	47.85%
Libertarian	Guy Meilleur	1,018	2.23%
Total votes		45,680	100%
Democratic gain from Republican			

North Carolina Senate
Preceded by Dan Blue	Minority Leader of the North Carolina Senate; 2025–present	Incumbent
