= Hugh E. Alexander =

Scottish minister (1884 - 1957)

Hugh Edward Alexander (1884–1957) was a Scottish minister who worked mostly in Switzerland.

Alexander was trained in as a minister in Glasgow and highly influenced by Reuben A. Torrey, Dwight L. Moody and the Keswick movement, but also the 1904–1905 Welsh Revival.

He launched missions to Switzerland, and was the founder of the Geneva Bible Society, Geneva Bible School and Action Biblique.

He is the author of Manne du matin.
