= Boomer Township, Wilkes County, North Carolina =

Township in North Carolina, United States

Coordinates: 36°04′02″N 81°15′13″W

Boomer Township
- Township
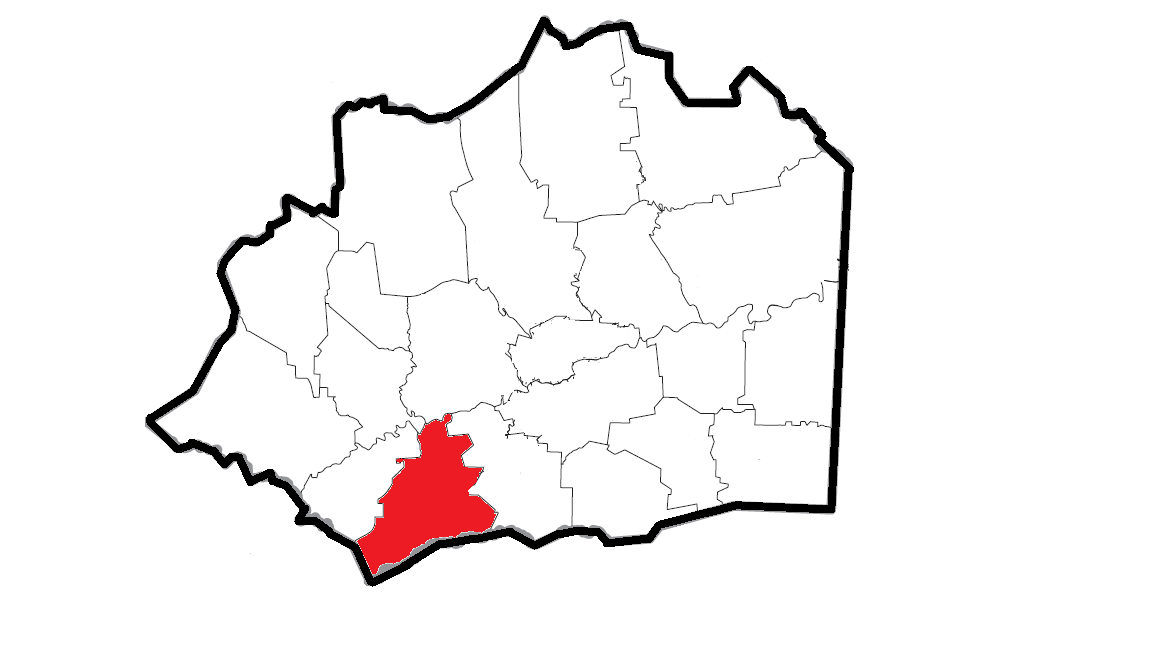
- Location of Boomer Township within Wilkes County

- Location of Wilkes County within North Carolina
- Country: United States
- State: North Carolina
- County: Wilkes

Population
  - Estimate (2023): 1,279
- Time zone: UTC-5 (EST)
  - Summer (DST): UTC-4 (EDT)
- ZIP Codes: 28606, 28654
- Area codes: 336, 743

Boomer Township is a township in Wilkes County, North Carolina, United States.

== Geography ==
Boomer Township is one of 21 townships in Wilkes County. The township is located in the southwestern portion of the county. It is bordered to the southwest by Caldwell County and to the south by Alexander County.

== Population ==
In 2023, the population estimate was 1,279.
