= Friendship, Wake County, North Carolina =

Unincorporated community in North Carolina, US

Coordinates: 35°41′56″N 78°53′59″W

Friendship (formerly, Jordans) is an unincorporated community in Wake County, North Carolina, United States. It lies at an elevation of 390 feet (119 m).

== History ==
Friendship was named for a Native American pow wow in the early 20th century, in which African-Americans, whites, and Native Americans agreed to live in peace.

== Education ==
Apex Friendship High School is located in the community. The naming of the high school was marked by some controversy, as local residents wanted to preserve the communities' history of the area by adding the name "Friendship", while many others thought "Friendship" was an inappropriate name for a high school and that "West Apex High School" would help students feel more connected. Ultimately, the Wake County School Board voted in favor of the name Apex Friendship High School.

The affiliated schools in the community that cater for the other age groups include Apex Friendship Elementary School and Apex Friendship Middle School.
