= Hugh Quincy Alexander =

American politician (1911–1989)

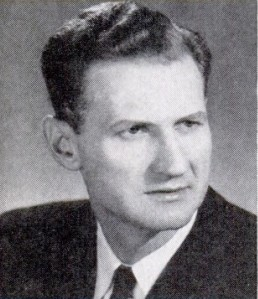

Member of the U.S. House of Representatives from North Carolina's 9th district
- In office January 3, 1953 – January 3, 1963
- Preceded by: Robert L. Doughton
- Succeeded by: Jim Broyhill

Member of the North Carolina House of Representatives
- In office 1947–1949

Personal details
- Born: Hugh Quincy Alexander; August 7, 1911 Glendon, North Carolina, U.S.
- Died: September 17, 1989 (aged 78) Kannapolis, North Carolina, U.S.
- Party: Democratic
- Education: Duke University; UNC Chapel Hill
- Profession: Attorney

Military service
- Branch: United States Navy
- Service years: 1942–1946
- Conflict: World War II

Hugh Quincy Alexander (August 7, 1911 – September 17, 1989) was a Democratic U.S. representative from North Carolina between 1953 and 1963.

Born on a farm near Glendon, North Carolina in Moore County, in 1911, Alexander attended local public schools and then Duke University, graduating in 1932. He later studied law at the University of North Carolina at Chapel Hill and was admitted to the bar in 1937. Practicing law in Kannapolis, North Carolina for several years, Alexander then served in the United States Navy during World War II from 1942 to 1946, including thirty-four months of duty overseas.

In 1947 and 1949, Alexander served in the North Carolina House of Representatives. He was a solicitor for the Cabarrus County Recorders Court from 1950 to 1952 and a state commander for the American Legion in 1951.

In 1952, Alexander was elected to the 83rd U.S. Congress, succeeding former Ways and Means chairman Robert Doughton. He was reelected four times, but never was able to establish a secure foothold in his district due to a somewhat liberal voting record and growing Republican influence in the district.

He was a signatory to the 1956 Southern Manifesto that opposed the desegregation of public schools ordered by the Supreme Court in Brown v. Board of Education.

North Carolina lost a congressional district after the 1960 census, and the state legislature saw a chance to get rid of Charlotte-area congressman Charles R. Jonas, then the only Republican in the North Carolina delegation. In the process, however, they added several Republican-leaning areas to Alexander's district. The plan backfired disastrously in the 1962 elections, in which Jonas won easily in his new district and Alexander lost by less than a percentage point to Republican furniture executive Jim Broyhill. Alexander was the last Democrat has represented North Carolina's 9th district until the 2026 elections when Richard Ojeda was elected.

After leaving Congress, he was chief counsel to the Senate Rules and Administration Committee from 1963 to 1976. Alexander died in Kannapolis in 1989.

U.S. House of Representatives
Preceded by Robert L. Doughton	Member of the U.S. House of Representatives from North Carolina's 9th congressional district 1953–1963	Succeeded by Jim Broyhill
