= Erin Paré =

American politician from North Carolina

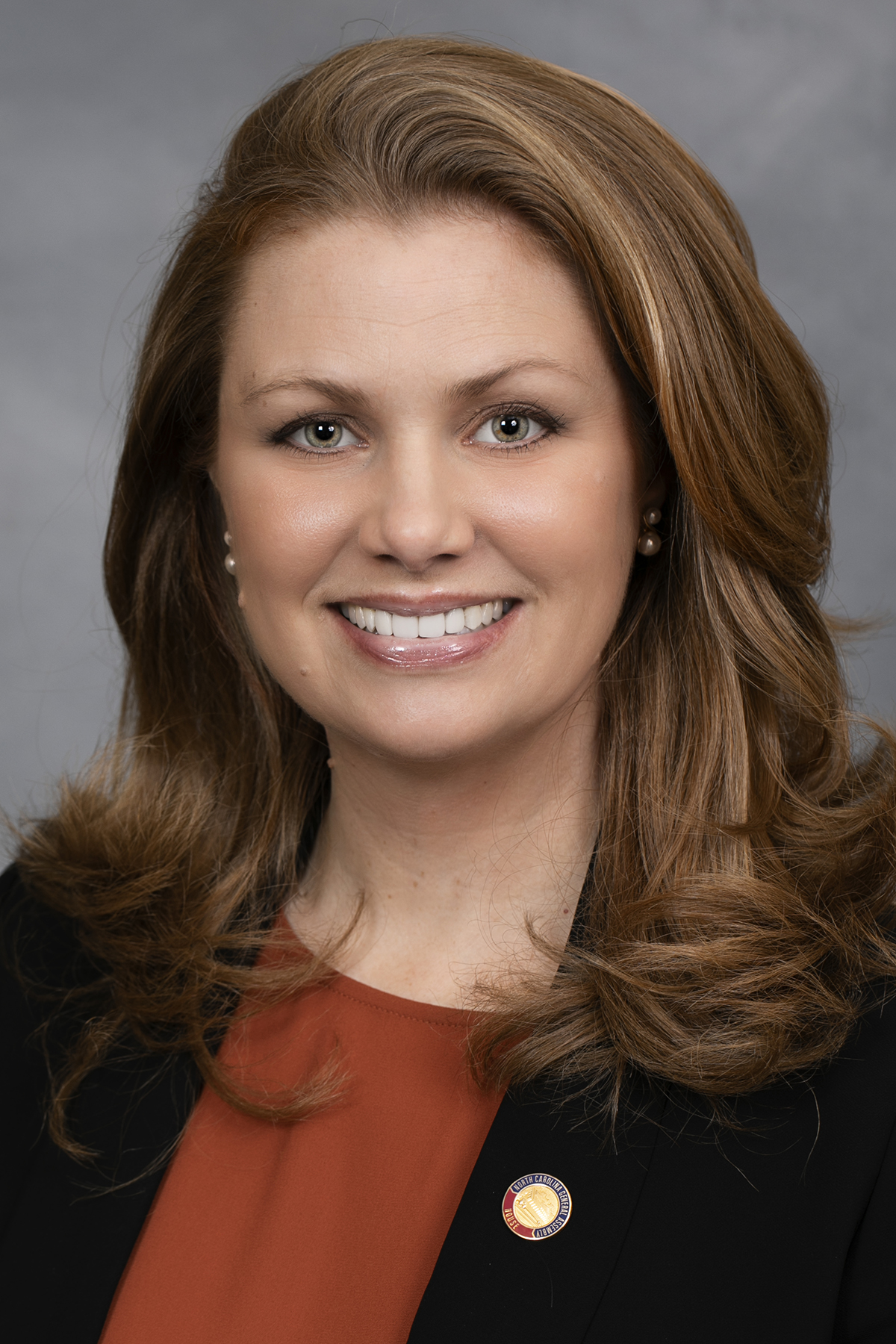

Member of the North Carolina House of Representatives from the 37th district
- Incumbent
- Assumed office January 1, 2021
- Preceded by: Sydney Batch
- Succeeded by: Winn Decker

Personal details
- Party: Republican
- Education: George Mason University (BA, MA)

Erin Pauling Paré is an American politician who is a Republican member of the North Carolina General Assembly. Paré represents the state's 37th House district.

== Early life and education ==
Paré who grew up in Herndon, Virginia. She has a B.A. in government and international politics and an M.A. in international commerce and policy from George Mason University.

== Career ==
Paré served as a lobbyist for a political consulting firm in Washington D.C. from 2000–2006, specializing in government regulation reform. She served as the senior account executive and director of the Regulatory Improvement Council, which represented small and large business coalitions.

== Political career ==
Following her campaign for representative of the 37th district, Paré won the 2020 general election, representing the Republican Party. She secured fifty percent of the vote while her closest rival, Democrat Sydney Batch, secured forty-seven percent. Paré raised $223,269 in defeating the incumbent Batch, who raised $1,109,417.

Paré is a member of the Intellectual and Developmental Disabilities (I/DD) Caucus, the Life Science Caucus, and the Joint Bipartisan Arts Caucus. In 2026, Paré announced on Facebook and X that she was "considering legislation to regulate what transgender school employees wear in school". In the post, she did not identify the teacher by name, but said she, "had contacted the Wake school system to raise concerns about the teacher’s attire on campus".

During her third term in office from 2025–2026, Paré was a chair of the Appropriations Committee, vice chair of the Appropriations General Government and Rules Committees, and a member of the Energy & Public Utilities, Health, Homeland Security & Military & Veterans Affairs, and Transportation Committees.

Paré was unseated by Democrat Winn Decker during the 2026 mid-term elections.

== Personal life ==
Paré and her husband are the owners of Play It Again Sports in Holly Springs, North Carolina, where she has lived with her family since 2012. Paré is a violinist and the founder and president of a local non-profit youth orchestra, Holly Strings Youth Orchestra, founded in 2018.

North Carolina House of Representatives
Preceded by Sydney Batch	Member of the North Carolina House of Representatives from the 37th district 2021–2026	Succeeded by Winn Decker
