= Robert Quincy Beard =

American politician and Lutheran minister

Member of the North Carolina House of Representatives
- In office 1969–1973
- Constituency: Catawba County

Personal details
- Born: December 7, 1929 Statesville, Iredell County, North Carolina, U.S.
- Died: March 8, 2021 (aged 91) Statesville, North Carolina, U.S.
- Party: Republican
- Spouse: Carrie Stewart Beard
- Children: 3
- Education: Lenoir–Rhyne College (BA); Lutheran Theological Southern Seminary (MDiv); Lenoir–Rhyne University (DD, honorary)
- Occupation: Lutheran minister; politician; elder care executive

Robert Quincy Beard (December 7, 1929 – March 8, 2021) was an American Lutheran minister, politician, and elder care executive from North Carolina. A Republican, he represented Catawba County in the North Carolina House of Representatives for three terms from 1969 to 1973. Outside of politics, he had a long career in the Evangelical Lutheran Church in America and served as president and CEO of Lutheran Services for the Aging in Salisbury, from 1978 to 1992.

== Early life and education ==
Beard was born in Statesville, North Carolina, on December 7, 1929, the only child of Robert E. Beard and Nola Jane Hoover Beard. He grew up in the Mount Hermon community of Iredell County and was baptized and confirmed at Mount Hermon Lutheran Church.

Beard was an honor graduate of Statesville High School. He then served four years in the United States Marine Corps, attaining the rank of staff sergeant. After his military service, he enrolled at Lenoir–Rhyne College in Hickory, where he earned a Bachelor of Arts degree in 1955, graduating cum laude and as a member of the Mu Sigma Epsilon scholastic society. In 1958, he graduated from Lutheran Theological Southern Seminary with a Master of Divinity and was ordained into the Evangelical Lutheran Church, North Carolina Synod.

== Ministry ==
After his ordination, Beard served as pastor of several Lutheran congregations in North Carolina: Grace Lutheran Church in Liberty; Faith Lutheran Church in Conover; and St. Paul's Lutheran Church in Startown, near Newton.

After leaving the legislature in 1973, Beard returned to active parish ministry at Alamance Lutheran Church from 1976 to 1978. Following his retirement from Lutheran Services for the Aging in 1992, he served as interim pastor at Holy Trinity Lutheran Church in Troutman, St. John's Lutheran Church in Lenoir, and St. Mark's Lutheran Church near Blowing Rock, continuing through 2007.

Beard retained his status as an ordained minister of the ELCA, North Carolina Synod, throughout his career and served as a guest minister at churches across the state. His active ministry spanned more than 62 years, from 1958 through 2021. In 2010, Lenoir–Rhyne University awarded him an honorary Doctor of Divinity degree.

== Political career ==
While serving as pastor of St. Paul's Lutheran Church in Startown, Beard was elected to the North Carolina House of Representatives as a Republican representing Catawba County. He served three terms beginning in 1969.

In July 1973, Beard resigned from both the state legislature and his pastorate at St. Paul's to accept an appointment as head of the North Carolina Office for the Aging in Raleigh, a state government agency. He served in that position from 1973 to 1976.

== Elder care leadership ==
In 1978, Beard became president and CEO of Lutheran Services for the Aging, Inc. (now Lutheran Services Carolinas) in Salisbury, a position he held until his retirement in 1992. During his tenure, he was inducted into the Joe Keppler Hall of Fame in Washington State and received a Distinguished Citizen's Award from Lenoir–Rhyne University.

== Personal life and death ==
Beard was married to Carrie Stewart Beard for more than 70 years. They had three daughters.

Beard died on March 8, 2021, at Gordon Hospice House in Statesville, North Carolina, at the age of 91. His funeral was held at Holy Trinity Lutheran Church in Troutman, with burial at St. Martin's Cemetery with full military honors.
