= 1972 United States Senate elections =

- November 7, 1972
- Class 2

33 (Note: Including both the concurrent special and regular elections in Georgia. Does not count the Vermont special election.) of the 100 seats in the United States Senate 51 seats needed for a majority
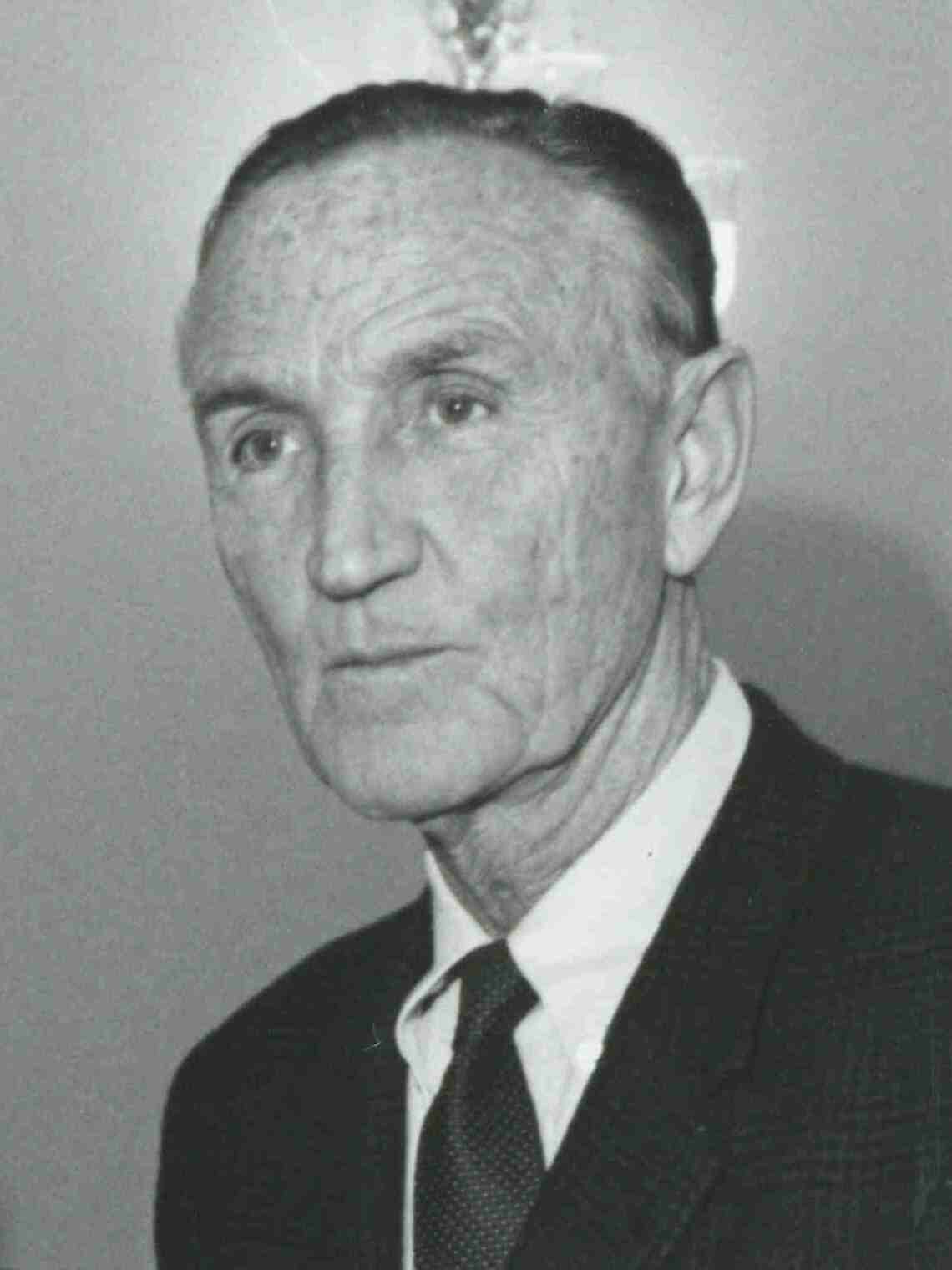

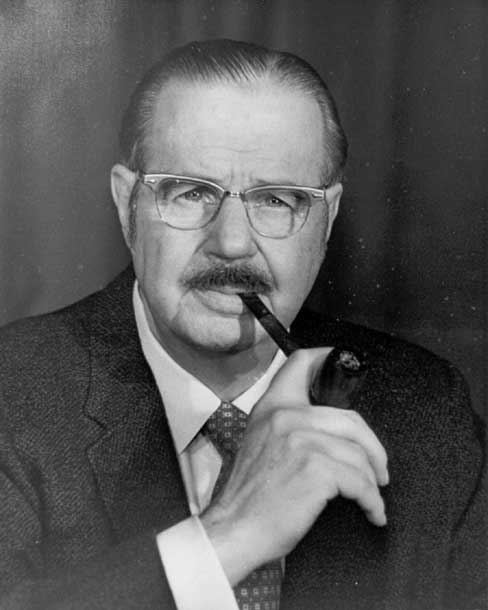
	Majority party	Minority party
Leader	Mike Mansfield	Hugh Scott
Party	Democratic	Republican
Leader since	January 3, 1961	September 24, 1969
Leader's seat	Montana	Pennsylvania
Seats before	54	44
Seats after	56	42
Seat change	▲2	▼2
Popular vote	17,199,567	19,821,203
Percentage	45.5%	52.4%
Seats up	14	19
Races won	16	17
	Third party	Fourth party
Party	Independent	Conservative
Seats before	1	1
Seats after	1	1
Seat change	Steady	Steady
Seats up	0	0
Races won	0	0
- Results of the elections: Democratic gain Republican gain Democratic hold Republican hold No election
Majority Leader before election
Mike Mansfield
Democratic
Elected Majority Leader
Mike Mansfield
Democratic

The 1972 United States Senate elections were held on November 7, with the 33 seats of Class 2 contested in regular elections. They coincided with the landslide re-election of Republican President Richard Nixon. Despite Nixon's landslide victory, Democrats increased their majority by two seats. The Democrats picked up open seats in Kentucky and South Dakota, and defeated four incumbent senators: Gordon Allott of Colorado, J. Caleb Boggs of Delaware, Jack Miller of Iowa, and Margaret Chase Smith of Maine. The Republicans picked up open seats in New Mexico, North Carolina, and Oklahoma, and defeated one incumbent, William B. Spong Jr. of Virginia.

After the elections, Democrats held 56 seats, and Republicans held 42 seats, with one Conservative and one independent senator in the chamber as well. These were the first elections in which all citizens at least 18 years of age (instead of 21 and older) could vote, due to the 1971 passage of the 26th Amendment.

As of 2025, this is the last time a Republican was elected to a Senate seat in New Jersey. This is also the earliest Senate election cycle where at least one first-elected member is still alive, with two from the 1972 freshman class still being alive. One of them, and the most notable, is Joe Biden, the 46th president of the United States (2021–2025) and 47th vice president (2009–2017), who defeated J. Caleb Boggs in the election in Delaware. The other is Sam Nunn, who defeated appointed senator David H. Gambrell in the Democratic primary and won in the dual special and regular elections in Georgia.

== Results summary ==
↓
56	1	1	42
Democratic	I	C	Republican

Parties						Total
Parties	Democratic	Republican	Conservative	Independent	Other	Total
Last elections (1970) Before these elections	54	44	1	1	0	100
Not up	40	25	1	1	—	67
Up Class 2 (1966→1972)	14	19	0	0	—	33
Incumbent retired	3	3	—	—	—	6
Held by same party	1	1	—	—	—	2
Replaced by other party	▼2 Republicans replaced by ▲2 Democrats ▼2 Democrats replaced by ▲2 Republicans		—	—	—	4
Result	3	3	0	0	0	6
Incumbent ran	11	16	—	—	—	27
Won re-election	8	12	—	—	—	20
Lost re-election	▼4 Republicans replaced by ▲4 Democrats ▼1 Democrat replaced by ▲1 Republican		—	—	—	5
Lost renomination, but held by same party	1	0	—	—	—	1
Lost renomination, and party lost	▼1 Democrat replaced by ▲1 Republican		—	—	—	1
Result	13	14	0	0	0	27
Total elected	16	17	0	0	0	33
Net gain/loss	▲2	▼2	Steady	Steady	Steady	2
Nationwide vote	17,199,567	19,821,203	42,348	318,238	427,742	37,809,098
Share	45.49%	52.42%	0.11%	0.84%	1.13%	100%
Result	56	42	1	1	0	100

Source: Clerk of the U.S. House of Representatives (1973). "Statistics of the Presidential and Congressional Election of November 7, 1972" (PDF). U.S. Government Printing Office.

== Gains, losses, and holds ==
=== Retirements ===
Three Republicans and three Democrats retired instead of seeking re-election.

State	Senator	Replaced by
Idaho	Len Jordan	Jim McClure
Kentucky	John Sherman Cooper	Walter Dee Huddleston
Louisiana	Elaine Edwards	J. Bennett Johnston
New Mexico	Clinton Anderson	Pete Domenici
Oklahoma	Fred R. Harris	Dewey F. Bartlett
South Dakota	Karl Mundt	James Abourezk

=== Defeats ===
Four Republicans and three Democrats sought re-election but lost in the primary or general election.

State	Senator	Replaced by
Colorado	Gordon Allott	Floyd Haskell
Delaware	J. Caleb Boggs	Joe Biden
Georgia	David H. Gambrell	Sam Nunn
Iowa	Jack Miller	Dick Clark
Maine	Margaret Chase Smith	William Hathaway
North Carolina	B. Everett Jordan	Jesse Helms
Virginia	William Spong Jr.	William L. Scott

=== Post-election changes ===
State	Senator	Replaced by
Ohio (Class 3)	William B. Saxbe	Howard Metzenbaum

== Change in composition ==
=== Before the elections ===
After the January 7, 1972, Vermont special election.

D_{1}	D_{2}	D_{3}	D_{4}	D_{5}	D_{6}	D_{7}	D_{8}	D_{9}	D_{10}
D_{20}	D_{19}	D_{18}	D_{17}	D_{16}	D_{15}	D_{14}	D_{13}	D_{12}	D_{11}
D_{21}	D_{22}	D_{23}	D_{24}	D_{25}	D_{26}	D_{27}	D_{28}	D_{29}	D_{30}
D_{40}	D_{39}	D_{38}	D_{37}	D_{36}	D_{35}	D_{34}	D_{33}	D_{32}	D_{31}
D_{41} Ala. Ran	D_{42} Ark. Ran	D_{43} Ga. (sp); Ga. (reg); Ran	D_{44} La. Retired	D_{45} Minn. Ran	D_{46} Miss. Ran	D_{47} Mont. Ran	D_{48} N.H. Ran	D_{49} N.M. Ran	D_{50} N.C. Ran
Majority →									D_{51} Okla. Ran
R_{41} S.D. Ran	R_{42} Tenn. Ran	R_{43} Texas; Retired	R_{44} Wyo. Ran	C_{1}	I_{1}	D_{54} W.Va. Ran	D_{53} Va. Ran	D_{52} R.I. Ran	D_{51} Okla. Ran
R_{40} S.C. Ran	R_{39} Ore. Ran	R_{38} N.J. Ran	R_{37} Neb. Ran	R_{36} Mich. Ran	R_{35} Mass. Ran	R_{34} Maine; Ran	R_{33} Ky. Retired	R_{32} Kan. Ran	R_{31} Iowa; Ran
R_{21}	R_{22}	R_{23}	R_{24}	R_{25}	R_{26} Alaska; Ran	R_{27} Colo. Ran	R_{28} Del. Ran	R_{29} Idaho; Ran	R_{30} Ill. Ran
R_{20}	R_{19}	R_{18}	R_{17}	R_{16}	R_{15}	R_{14}	R_{13}	R_{12}	R_{11}
R_{1}	R_{2}	R_{3}	R_{4}	R_{5}	R_{6}	R_{7}	R_{8}	R_{9}	R_{10}

=== Elections results ===
D_{1}	D_{2}	D_{3}	D_{4}	D_{5}	D_{6}	D_{7}	D_{8}	D_{9}	D_{10}
D_{20}	D_{19}	D_{18}	D_{17}	D_{16}	D_{15}	D_{14}	D_{13}	D_{12}	D_{11}
D_{21}	D_{22}	D_{23}	D_{24}	D_{25}	D_{26}	D_{27}	D_{28}	D_{29}	D_{30}
D_{40}	D_{39}	D_{38}	D_{37}	D_{36}	D_{35}	D_{34}	D_{33}	D_{32}	D_{31}
D_{41} Ala. Re-elected	D_{42} Ark. Re-elected	D_{43} Ga. (sp); Ga. (reg); Hold	D_{44} La. Hold	D_{45} Minn. Re-elected	D_{46} Miss. Re-elected	D_{47} Mont. Re-elected	D_{48} N.H. Re-elected	D_{49} R.I. Re-elected	D_{50} W.Va. Re-elected
Majority →									D_{51} Colo. Gain
R_{41} Okla. Gain	R_{42} Va. Gain	C_{1}	I_{1}	D_{56} S.D. Gain	D_{55} Maine; Gain	D_{54} Ky. Gain	D_{53} Iowa; Gain	D_{52} Del. Gain	D_{51} Colo. Gain
R_{40} N.C. Gain	R_{39} N.M. Gain	R_{38} Wyo. Re-elected	R_{37} Texas; Re-elected	R_{36} Tenn. Re-elected	R_{35} S.C. Re-elected	R_{34} Ore. Re-elected	R_{33} N.J. Re-elected	R_{32} Neb. Re-elected	R_{31} Mich. Re-elected
R_{21}	R_{22}	R_{23}	R_{24}	R_{25}	R_{26} Alaska; Re-elected	R_{27} Idaho; Hold	R_{28} Ill. Re-elected	R_{29} Kan. Re-elected	R_{30} Mass. Re-elected
R_{20}	R_{19}	R_{18}	R_{17}	R_{16}	R_{15}	R_{14}	R_{13}	R_{12}	R_{11}
R_{1}	R_{2}	R_{3}	R_{4}	R_{5}	R_{6}	R_{7}	R_{8}	R_{9}	R_{10}

Key:

C_{#}	Conservative
D_{#}	Democratic
R_{#}	Republican
I_{#}	Independent

== Race summaries ==
=== Special elections during the 92nd Congress ===
In these special elections, the winner was seated during 1972 or before January 3, 1973; ordered by election date, then state.

State (linked to summaries below)	Incumbent			Results	Candidates
State (linked to summaries below)	Senator	Party	Electoral history	Results	Candidates
Vermont (Class 1)	Robert Stafford	Republican	1971 (Appointed)	Interim appointee elected January 7, 1972.	▌ ✓ Robert Stafford (Republican) 64.4%; ▌Randolph T. Major (Democratic) 33.4%; ▌Bernie Sanders (Liberty Union) 2.2%
Georgia (Class 2)	David H. Gambrell	Democratic	1971 (Appointed)	Interim appointee lost nomination. New senator elected November 7, 1972 and was seated the next day. Democratic hold. Winner also elected to the next term, see below.	▌ ✓ Sam Nunn (Democratic) 52.0%; ▌Fletcher Thompson (Republican) 46.5%; ▌Alice Conner (Independent) 1.0%; ▌George Schmidt (Independent) 0.5%

=== Elections leading to the next Congress ===
In these general elections, the winners were elected for the term beginning January 3, 1973; ordered by state.

All of the elections involved the Class 2 seats.

State (linked to summaries below)	Incumbent			Results	Candidates
State (linked to summaries below)	Senator	Party	Electoral history	Results	Candidates
Alabama	John Sparkman	Democratic	1946 (special); 1948; 1954; 1960; 1966	Incumbent re-elected.	▌ ✓ John Sparkman (Democratic) 62.3%; ▌Winton M. Blount (Republican) 33.1%; ▌John L. LeFlore (National Democratic) 3.0%; ▌Jerome Couch (Prohibition) 1.0%; ▌Herbert Stone (Conservative) 0.6%
Alaska	Ted Stevens	Republican	1968 (Appointed); 1970 (special)	Incumbent re-elected.	▌ ✓ Ted Stevens (Republican) 77.3%; ▌Gene Guess (Democratic) 22.7%
Arkansas	John L. McClellan	Democratic	1942; 1948; 1954; 1960; 1966	Incumbent re-elected.	▌ ✓ John L. McClellan (Democratic) 60.8%; ▌Wayne H. Babbitt (Republican) 39.1%
Colorado	Gordon Allott	Republican	1954; 1960; 1966	Incumbent lost re-election. Democratic gain.	▌ ✓ Floyd Haskell (Democratic) 49.4%; ▌Gordon Allott (Republican) 48.4%; ▌Secundion Salazar (Raza Unida) 1.4%; ▌Henry Olshaw (American) 0.8%
Delaware	J. Caleb Boggs	Republican	1960; 1966	Incumbent lost re-election. Democratic gain.	▌ ✓ Joe Biden (Democratic) 50.5%; ▌J. Caleb Boggs (Republican) 49.1%
Georgia	David H. Gambrell	Democratic	1971 (Appointed)	Interim appointee lost nomination. Democratic hold. Winner also elected to finish the term, see above.	▌ ✓ Sam Nunn (Democratic) 54.0%; ▌Fletcher Thompson (Republican) 46.0%
Idaho	Len Jordan	Republican	1962 (Appointed); 1962 (special); 1966	Incumbent retired. Republican hold.	▌ ✓ Jim McClure (Republican) 52.3%; ▌William E. Davis (Democratic) 45.5%
Illinois	Charles H. Percy	Republican	1966	Incumbent re-elected.	▌ ✓ Charles H. Percy (Republican) 62.2%; ▌Roman Pucinski (Democratic) 37.4%
Iowa	Jack Miller	Republican	1960; 1966	Incumbent lost re-election. Democratic gain.	▌ ✓ Dick Clark (Democratic) 55.1%; ▌Jack Miller (Republican) 44.1%
Kansas	James B. Pearson	Republican	1962 (Appointed); 1962 (special); 1966	Incumbent re-elected.	▌ ✓ James B. Pearson (Republican) 71.4%; ▌Arch Tetzlaff (Democratic) 23.0%
Kentucky	John Sherman Cooper	Republican	1946 (special); 1948 (Lost); 1952 (special); 1954 (Lost); 1956 (special); 1960; 1966	Incumbent retired. Democratic gain.	▌ ✓ Walter Dee Huddleston (Democratic) 50.9%; ▌Louie Nunn (Republican) 47.6%
Louisiana	Elaine Edwards	Democratic	1972 (Appointed)	Interim appointee ineligible to run. Democratic hold. Interim appointee resigned November 13, 1972, to give successor preferential seniority. Winner appointed November 14, 1972.	▌ ✓ J. Bennett Johnston (Democratic) 55.2%; ▌John McKeithen (Independent) 23.1%; ▌Ben Toledano (Republican) 16.1%; ▌Hall M. Lyons (American) 2.7%
Maine	Margaret Chase Smith	Republican	1948; 1954; 1960; 1966	Incumbent lost re-election. Democratic gain.	▌ ✓ William Hathaway (Democratic) 53.2%; ▌Margaret Chase Smith (Republican) 46.8%
Massachusetts	Edward Brooke	Republican	1966	Incumbent re-elected.	▌ ✓ Edward Brooke (Republican) 63.5%; ▌John J. Droney (Democratic) 34.7%; ▌Donald Gurewitz (Socialist Workers) 1.7%
Michigan	Robert P. Griffin	Republican	1966 (Appointed); 1966	Incumbent re-elected.	▌ ✓ Robert P. Griffin (Republican) 52.3%; ▌Frank J. Kelley (Democratic) 46.3%
Minnesota	Walter Mondale	DFL	1964 (Appointed); 1966	Incumbent re-elected.	▌ ✓ Walter Mondale (DFL) 56.7%; ▌Phil Hansen (Republican) 42.9%
Mississippi	James Eastland	Democratic	1942; 1948; 1954; 1960; 1966	Incumbent re-elected.	▌ ✓ James Eastland (Democratic) 58.1%; ▌Gil Carmichael (Republican) 38.7%
Montana	Lee Metcalf	Democratic	1960; 1966	Incumbent re-elected.	▌ ✓ Lee Metcalf (Democratic) 52.0%; ▌Henry S. Hibbard (Republican) 48.0%
Nebraska	Carl Curtis	Republican	1954; 1960; 1966	Incumbent re-elected.	▌ ✓ Carl Curtis (Republican) 53.1%; ▌Terry Carpenter (Democratic) 46.8%
New Hampshire	Thomas J. McIntyre	Democratic	1962 (special); 1966	Incumbent re-elected.	▌ ✓ Thomas J. McIntyre (Democratic) 56.9%; ▌Wesley Powell (Republican) 43.1%
New Jersey	Clifford P. Case	Republican	1954; 1960; 1966	Incumbent re-elected.	▌ ✓ Clifford P. Case (Republican) 62.5%; ▌Paul J. Krebs (Democratic) 34.5%
New Mexico	Clinton Anderson	Democratic	1948; 1954; 1960; 1966	Incumbent retired. Republican gain.	▌ ✓ Pete Domenici (Republican) 54.0%; ▌Jack Daniels (Democratic) 46.0%
North Carolina	B. Everett Jordan	Democratic	1958 (Appointed); 1958 (special); 1960; 1966	Incumbent lost renomination. Republican gain.	▌ ✓ Jesse Helms (Republican) 54.0%; ▌Nick Galifianakis (Democratic) 46.0%
Oklahoma	Fred R. Harris	Democratic	1964 (special); 1966	Incumbent retired. Republican gain.	▌ ✓ Dewey F. Bartlett (Republican) 51.4%; ▌Ed Edmondson (Democratic) 47.6%
Oregon	Mark Hatfield	Republican	1966	Incumbent re-elected.	▌ ✓ Mark Hatfield (Republican) 53.7%; ▌Wayne Morse (Democratic) 46.2%
Rhode Island	Claiborne Pell	Democratic	1960; 1966	Incumbent re-elected.	▌ ✓ Claiborne Pell (Democratic) 53.7%; ▌John Chafee (Republican) 45.7%
South Carolina	Strom Thurmond	Republican	1954 (write-in) (Note: Senator Strom Thurmond was originally elected as a Democrat in 1954, but as a write-in candidate, a special election in 1956 and 1960 before switching to a Republican in 1964. Thurmond won re-election as a Republican in 1966.); 1954 (Appointed); 1956 (Resigned); 1956 (special); 1960; 1966	Incumbent re-elected.	▌ ✓ Strom Thurmond (Republican) 63.3%; ▌Eugene N. Zeigler (Democratic) 36.7%
South Dakota	Karl Mundt	Republican	1948; 1948 (Appointed); 1954; 1960; 1966	Incumbent retired. Democratic gain.	▌ ✓ James Abourezk (Democratic) 57.0%; ▌Robert W. Hirsch (Republican) 42.9%
Tennessee	Howard Baker	Republican	1966	Incumbent re-elected.	▌ ✓ Howard Baker (Republican) 61.6%; ▌Ray Blanton (Democratic) 37.9%
Texas	John Tower	Republican	1961 (special); 1966	Incumbent re-elected.	▌ ✓ John Tower (Republican) 53.4%; ▌Barefoot Sanders (Democratic) 44.3%
Virginia	William Spong Jr.	Democratic	1966	Incumbent lost re-election. Republican gain.	▌ ✓ William L. Scott (Republican) 51.5%; ▌William Spong Jr. (Democratic) 46.1%
West Virginia	Jennings Randolph	Democratic	1958 (special); 1960; 1966	Incumbent re-elected.	▌ ✓ Jennings Randolph (Democratic) 66.5%; ▌Louise Leonard (Republican) 33.6%
Wyoming	Clifford Hansen	Republican	1966	Incumbent re-elected.	▌ ✓ Clifford Hansen (Republican) 71.3%; ▌Mike Vinich (Democratic) 28.7%

== Closest races ==
Seventeen races had a margin of victory under 10%:

State	Party of winner	Margin
Colorado	Democratic (flip)	1.0%
Delaware	Democratic (flip)	1.4%
Kentucky	Democratic (flip)	3.3%
Oklahoma	Republican (flip)	3.8%
Montana	Democratic	3.9%
Virginia	Republican (flip)	5.4%
Georgia (special)	Democratic	5.5%
Michigan	Republican	6.0%
Nebraska	Republican	6.3%
Maine	Democratic (flip)	6.4%
Idaho	Republican	6.8%
Oregon	Republican	7.5%
Georgia	Democratic	7.95% (Note: Georgia was the "tipping-point state".)
Rhode Island	Democratic	8.0%
New Mexico	Republican (flip)	8.0%
North Carolina	Republican (flip)	8.0%
Texas	Republican	9.1%

== Alabama ==
Alabama election
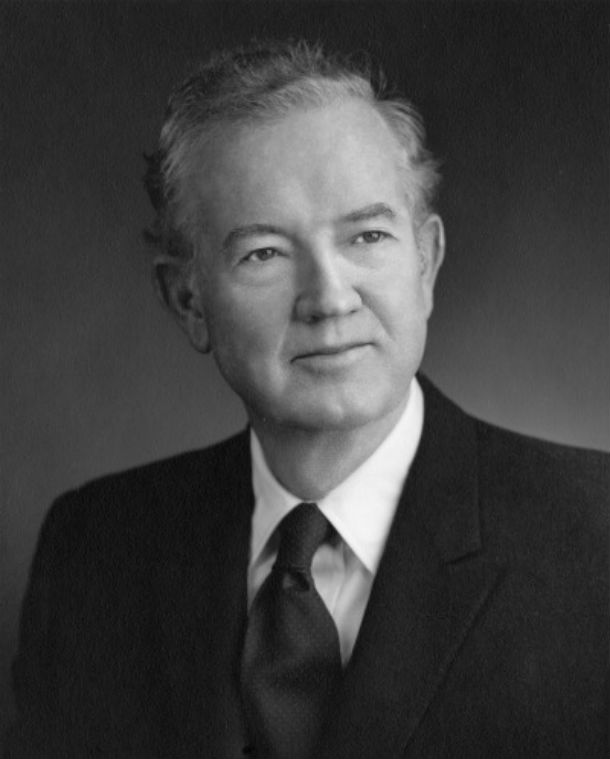

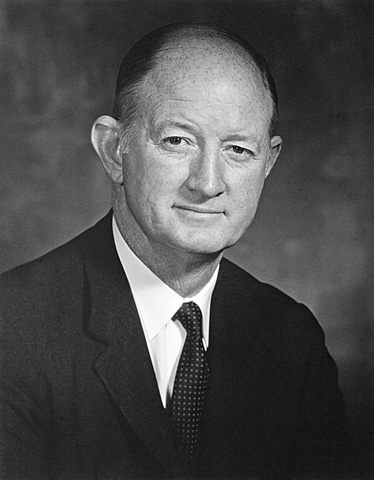
Nominee	John Sparkman	Winton Blount
Party	Democratic	Republican
Popular vote	654,491	347,523
Percentage	62.27%	33.06%
- County results Sparkman: 40–50% 50–60% 60–70% 70–80% Blount: 50–60% LeFlore: 40–50% 60–70%
U.S. senator before election
John Sparkman
Democratic
Elected U.S. Senator
John Sparkman
Democratic

In 1946, John H. Bankhead II suffered a stroke during a U.S. Senate hearing and died three weeks later. John Sparkman, who had served as U.S. representative since 1937 and was House Majority Whip, secured the endorsements of party leaders and ran unopposed to win the remainder of Bankhead's term. Sparkman was then re-elected in 1948, 1954, 1960, and 1966 all by wide margins. At the time, the Democratic Party was dominant in Alabama; winning the Democratic primary virtually guaranteed a general election victory. Until 1966, Sparkman never faced an opponent in the general election who garnered more than 30% of the vote. Sparkman also served as the running mate of Adlai Stevenson II in an unsuccessful 1952 presidential campaign.

However, in 1966, the Democratic Party began to feel the backlash of civil rights legislation in the South, and Sparkman faced his closest political contest to date. He defeated John Grenier with just 60% of the vote. Richard Nixon's election in 1968 also helped Republicans gain recognition in Alabama. In 1972, Sparkman faced Winton M. Blount, who was serving as postmaster general.

Sparkman ultimately increased his vote share in a lopsided victory over Blount, who won just two counties, Houston county and, fittingly, the phonetically similar Winston county. This would be Sparkman's final term as U.S. senator. He retired in 1979 and was succeeded by Howell Heflin.

1972 U.S. Senate election in Alabama
Party	Candidate	Votes	%
Democratic	John Sparkman (incumbent)	654,491	62.27
Republican	Winton M. Blount	347,523	33.06
NDPA	John L. LeFlore	31,421	2.99
Prohibition	Jerome B. Couch	10,826	1.03
Conservative	Herbert W. Stone	6,838	0.65
Majority		306,968	29.21
Turnout		1,051,099	
Democratic hold			

== Alaska ==
Alaska election
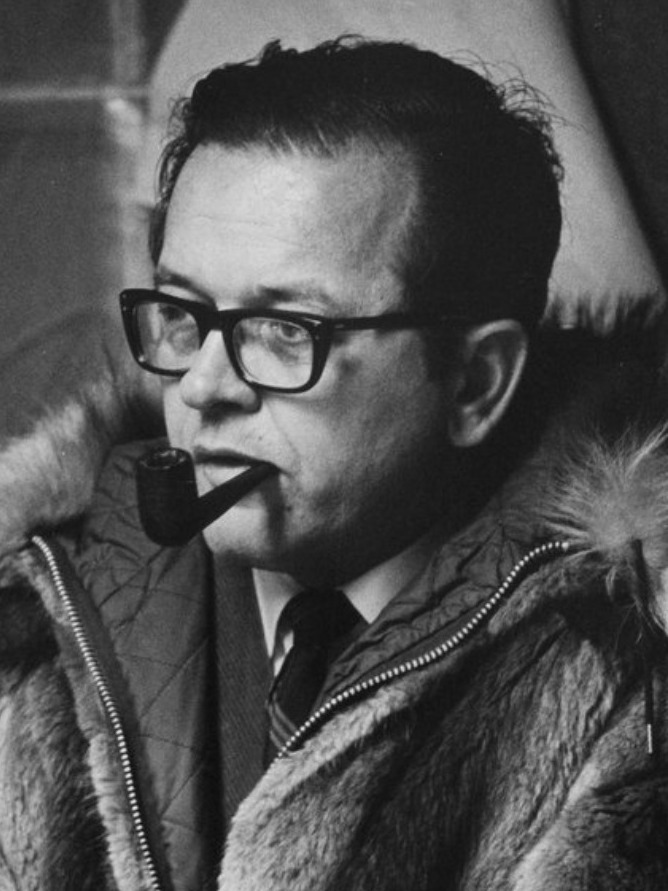

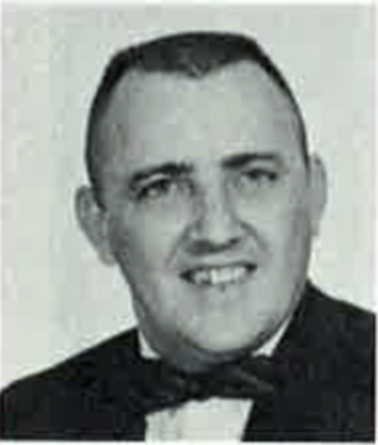
Nominee	Ted Stevens	Gene Guess
Party	Republican	Democratic
Popular vote	74,216	21,791
Percentage	77.30%	22.70%
- Results by state house district Stevens: 60–70% 70–80% 80–90%
U.S. senator before election
Ted Stevens
Republican
Elected U.S. Senator
Ted Stevens
Republican

Republican Ted Stevens was originally elected to the U.S. Senate in 1970, succeeding Democrat Bob Bartlett. He won election to the remainder of Barlett's term with nearly 60% of the vote.

In 1972, he faced Democrat Gene Guess in the general election. Stevens won re-election in a landslide even as Democrat Mike Gravel served as the state's other senator. On election day, Stevens won re-election to a second term (his first full term) against Guess, 77–23%. Stevens would be re-elected in 1978, 1984, 1990, 1996, and 2002 with at least 66% of the vote, before losing re-election in 2008 amid criminal charges.

1972 U.S. Senate election in Alaska
Party	Candidate	Votes	%
Republican	Ted Stevens (incumbent)	74,216	77.30
Democratic	Gene Guess	21,791	22.70
Majority		52,425	54.60
Turnout		96,007	
Republican hold			

== Arkansas ==
Arkansas election
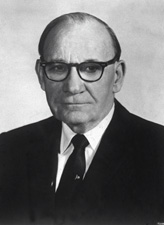

Nominee	John L. McClellan	Wayne Babbitt
Party	Democratic	Republican
Popular vote	386,398	248,238
Percentage	60.89%	39.12%
- County results McClellan: 50–60% 60–70% 70–80% Babbitt: 50–60%
U.S. senator before election
John L. McClellan
Democratic
Elected U.S. Senator
John L. McClellan
Democratic

Incumbent Democrat John Little McClellan was re-elected.

1972 U.S. Senate election in Arkansas
Party	Candidate	Votes	%
Democratic	John Little McClellan (incumbent)	386,398	60.88
Republican	Wayne H. Babbitt	248,238	39.12
Majority		138,160	21.76
Turnout		634,636	
Democratic hold			

== Colorado ==
Colorado election
- November 7, 1972
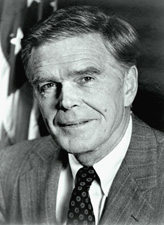

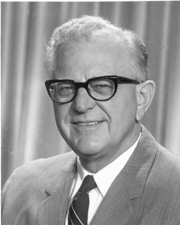
Nominee	Floyd Haskell	Gordon Allott
Party	Democratic	Republican
Popular vote	457,545	447,957
Percentage	49.41%	48.37%
- County results Haskell: 40–50% 50–60% 60–70% Allott: 40-50% 50-60% 60-70%
U.S. senator before election
Gordon Allott
Republican
Elected U.S. Senator
Floyd Haskell
Democratic

Incumbent Republican Senator Gordon Allott was defeated by Floyd K. Haskell.

1972 U.S. Senate election in Colorado
Party	Candidate	Votes	%
Democratic	Floyd K. Haskell	457,545	49.41
Republican	Gordon L. Allott (incumbent)	447,957	48.37
Raza Unida	Secundion 'Sal' Salazar	13,228	1.43
American	Henry Olshaw	7,353	0.79
Majority		9,588	1.04
Turnout		926,083	
Democratic gain from Republican			

== Delaware ==
Delaware election
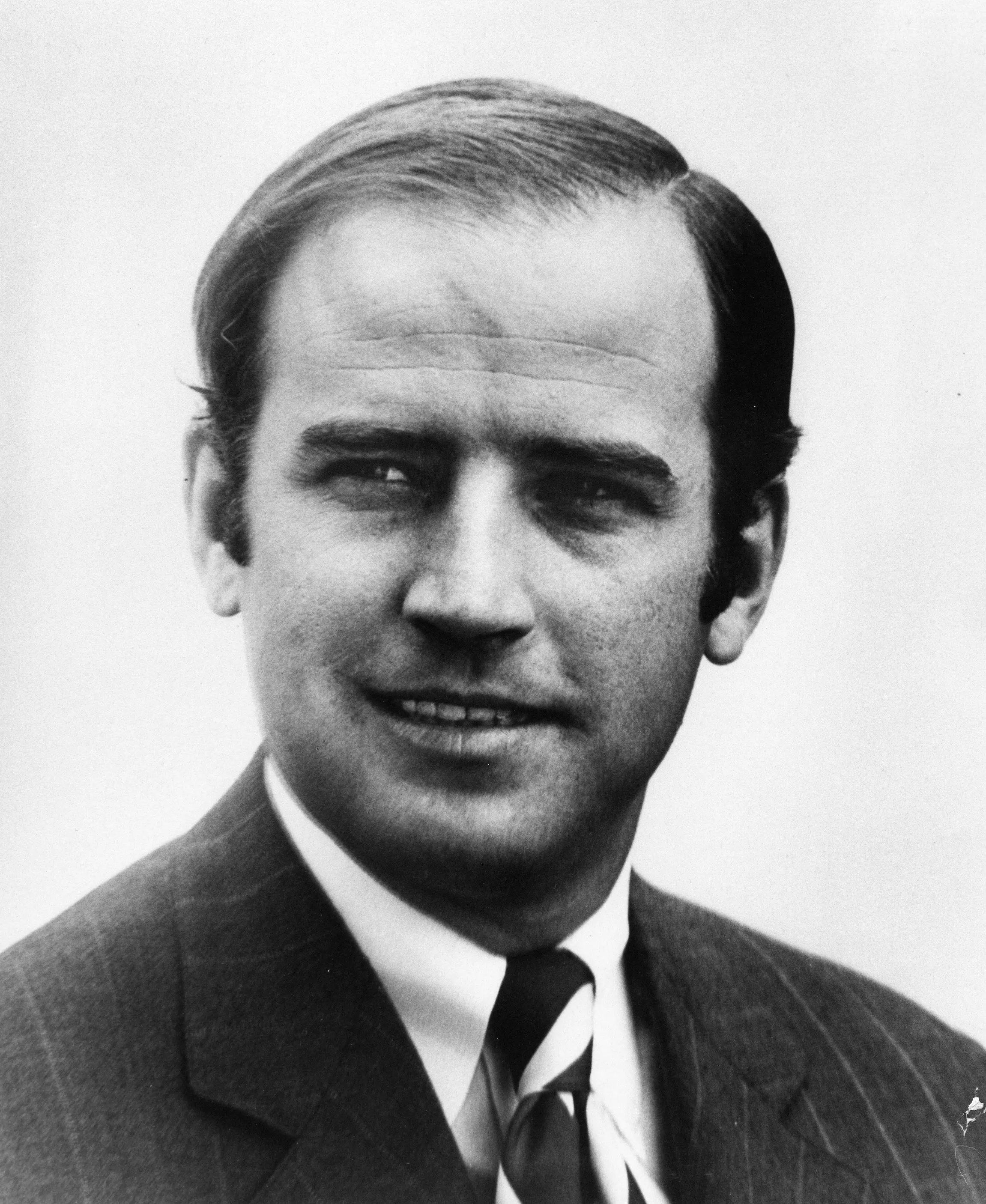

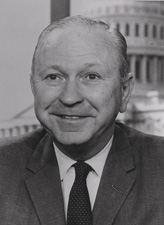
Nominee	Joe Biden	J. Caleb Boggs
Party	Democratic	Republican
Popular vote	116,006	112,844
Percentage	50.5%	49.1%
- Map key Biden: 40–50% 50–60% 60–70% 70–80% Boggs: 40–50% 50–60% 60–70%
U.S. senator before election
J. Caleb Boggs
Republican
Elected U.S. senator
Joe Biden
Democratic

Incumbent Republican Senator J. Caleb Boggs, running for a third term, faced off against future President Joe Biden, then a New Castle County councilman. Though Boggs was expected to easily win a third term over the then-unknown Biden, it ended up being the closest Senate election in 1972, and Biden narrowly beat out Boggs by a little over three thousand votes, winning what would be his first of seven terms.

Boggs, a longtime Delaware political figure, was considering retirement, which would likely have led to a primary campaign between two Republicans, U.S. Representative Pete du Pont and Wilmington Mayor Harry G. Haskell Jr. To avoid the anticipated divisive primary fight, President Richard M. Nixon helped convince Boggs to run again with full party support.

No other Democrat wanted to run against Boggs besides Biden. Biden's campaign had virtually no money and was given no chance of winning. It was managed by his sister Valerie Biden Owens (who would manage his future campaigns as well) and staffed by other members of his family, and relied on handed-out newsprint position papers. Biden did receive some assistance from the AFL–CIO and Democratic pollster Patrick Caddell. Biden's campaign issues focused on withdrawal from Vietnam, the environment, civil rights, mass transit, more equitable taxation, health care, the public's dissatisfaction with politics-as-usual, and "change".

During the summer, Biden trailed by almost 30 percentage points, but his energetic campaign, attractive young family, and ability to connect with voters' emotions gave the surging Biden an advantage over the ready-to-retire Boggs. Biden won the November 7, 1972, election in an upset by a margin of 3,162 votes.

At the time of the election, Biden was a little less than 30 years old; age 30 is a constitutional requirement for the U.S. Senate, and he reached that on November 20, in time for the Senate term beginning January 3. After his election he became the sixth-youngest senator in history.

1972 U.S. Senate election in Delaware
Party	Candidate	Votes	%	±%
Democratic	Joe Biden	116,006	50.48	+9.59%
Republican	J. Caleb Boggs (incumbent)	112,844	49.10	−10.02%
American	Henry Majka	803	0.35	
Prohibition	Herbert B. Wood	175	0.07	
Majority		3,162	1.38	−16.86%
Turnout		229,828		
Democratic gain from Republican				

== Georgia ==
Seven-term Democrat Richard Russell Jr. had served as U.S. senator since 1933, but he died on January 21, 1971, while serving as president pro tempore. Russell had supported segregation in the South and opposed civil rights legislation, as was common among Southern Democrats of the time. Governor of Georgia Jimmy Carter appointed Democrat David H. Gambrell, the chair of the Georgia Democratic Party, as interim senator, pending a special election.

=== Georgia (special) ===
Georgia special election
- November 7, 1972
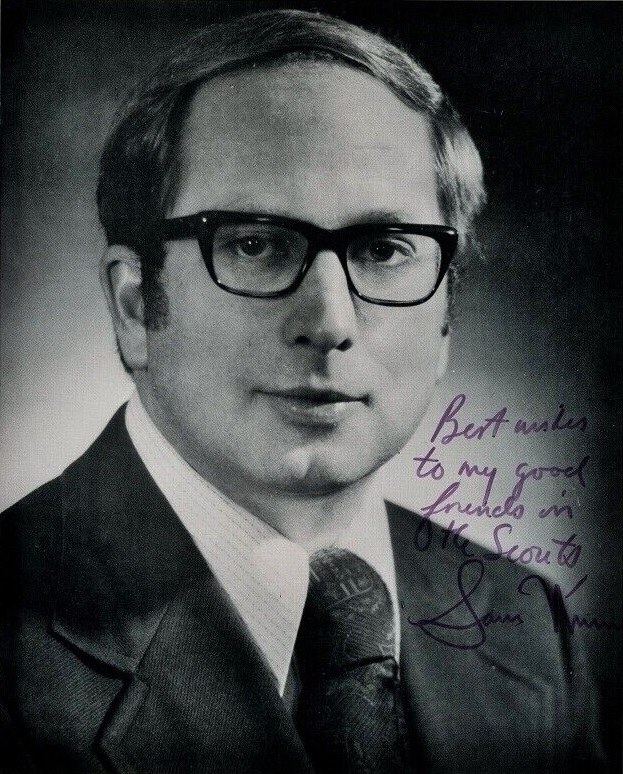

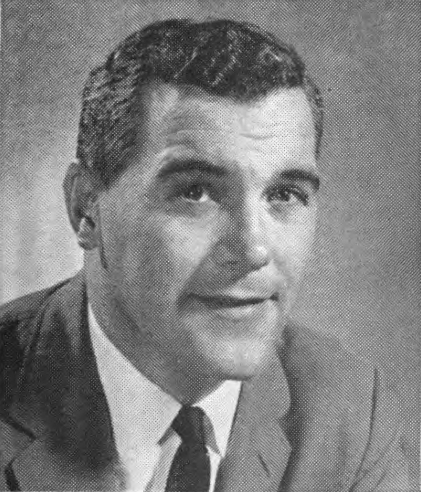
Nominee	Sam Nunn	Fletcher Thompson
Party	Democratic	Republican
Popular vote	404,890	362,501
Percentage	51.98%	46.54%
- Nunn: 40–50% 50–60% 60–70% 70–80% >90% Thompson: 40–50% 50–60% 60–70% 70–80% No vote
U.S. senator before election
David H. Gambrell
Democratic
Elected U.S. senator
Sam Nunn
Democratic

Sam Nunn, a Democratic member of the Georgia House of Representatives, won both the special and the regular elections. Nunn beat Gambrell in the August 29 special and regular primary run-off elections, despite trailing Gambrell initially 31-23% in the first round of voting.

In the special election to fill the remainder of Russell's term, Nunn faced Republican Congressman Fletcher Thompson. Nunn's campaign was noted to be more organized than was Thompson's. Nunn had support from numerous prominent Georgia Democrats, including Gambrell and Carter. Thompson's campaign was "almost literally a one-man effort", and he started the race with almost no footprint outside of his own district. Thompson was endorsed by Barry Goldwater, James L. Buckley, and Spiro Agnew.

On the day of the special election, Nunn defeated Thompson 52-47%. Though Thompson performed well in the Atlanta metro area, Nunn swept most rural counties en route to a victory.

Georgia special election
Party	Candidate	Votes	%
Democratic	Sam Nunn	404,890	51.98
Republican	Fletcher Thompson	362,501	46.54
Independent	Alice Conner	7,587	0.97
Independent	George E. Schmidt	3,932	0.51
Majority		42,389	7.94
Turnout			25.69%
Democratic hold			

=== Georgia (regular) ===
Georgia regular election
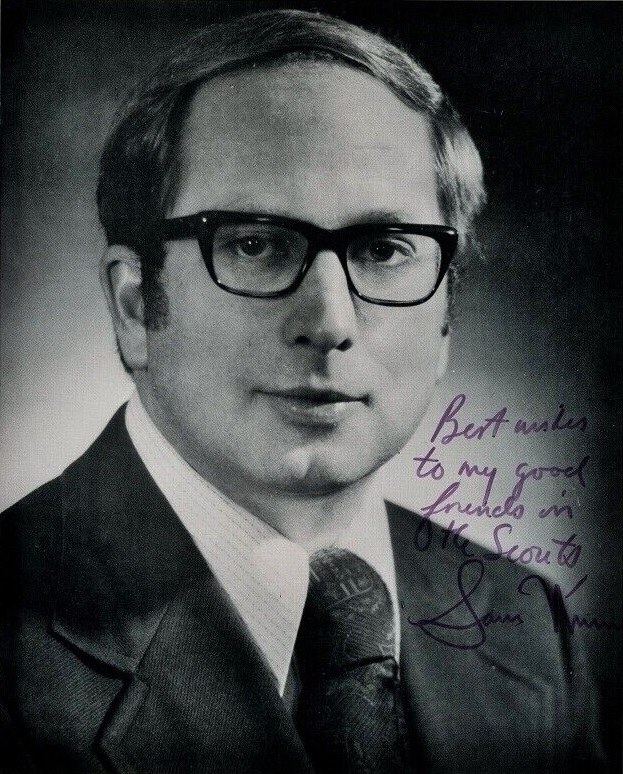

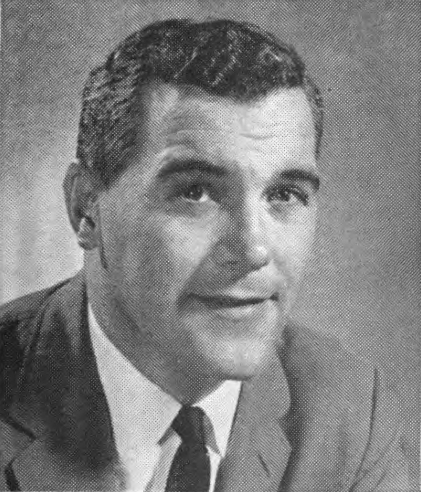
Nominee	Sam Nunn	Fletcher Thompson
Party	Democratic	Republican
Popular vote	636,060	542,291
Percentage	53.96%	46.01%
- Nunn: 50–60% 60–70% 70–80% 80–90% >90% Thompson: 50–60% 60–70%
U.S. senator before election
David H. Gambrell
Democratic
Elected U.S. senator
Sam Nunn
Democratic

In the general election held later that year, Nunn again defeated Thompson this time by almost 8 percentage points. Nonetheless, this marked a turning point in Georgia electoral politics: Nunn became the first Democrat to win a Senate race in Georgia despite losing the white vote. Nunn also proved to be more moderate than his predecessor Russell, voting in favor of abortion rights, gun control, affirmative action, and environmental regulations. Nunn would be re-elected in 1978, 1984, and 1990 before retiring in 1997. This was the last time he won less than 79% of the vote in a U.S. Senate election. In 1996, he was succeeded by Democrat Max Cleland.

Georgia regular election
Party	Candidate	Votes	%
Democratic	Sam Nunn	635,970	53.96
Republican	Fletcher Thompson	542,331	46.01
None	Write-ins	407	0.03
Majority		93,639	7.94
Turnout		1,178,708	25.69%
Democratic hold			

== Idaho ==
1972 United States Senate election in Idaho
- November 7, 1972
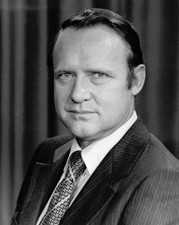

Nominee	Jim McClure	William E. Davis
Party	Republican	Democratic
Popular vote	161,804	140,915
Percentage	52.26%	45.52%
- County results McClure: 50–60% 60–70% Davis: 40–50% 50–60% 60–70%
U.S. senator before election
Len Jordan
Republican
Elected U.S. Senator
Jim McClure
Republican

The incumbent Republican Senator Len Jordan retired, and was succeeded by Jim McClure.

1972 U.S. Senate election in Idaho
Party	Candidate	Votes	%
Republican	Jim McClure	161,804	52.26
Democratic	William E. Davis	140,913	45.51
American	Jean L. Stoddard	6,885	2.22
Majority		20,891	6.75
Turnout		309,602	
Republican hold			

== Illinois ==
1972 United States Senate election in Illinois
- November 7, 1972
- Turnout: 51.24%
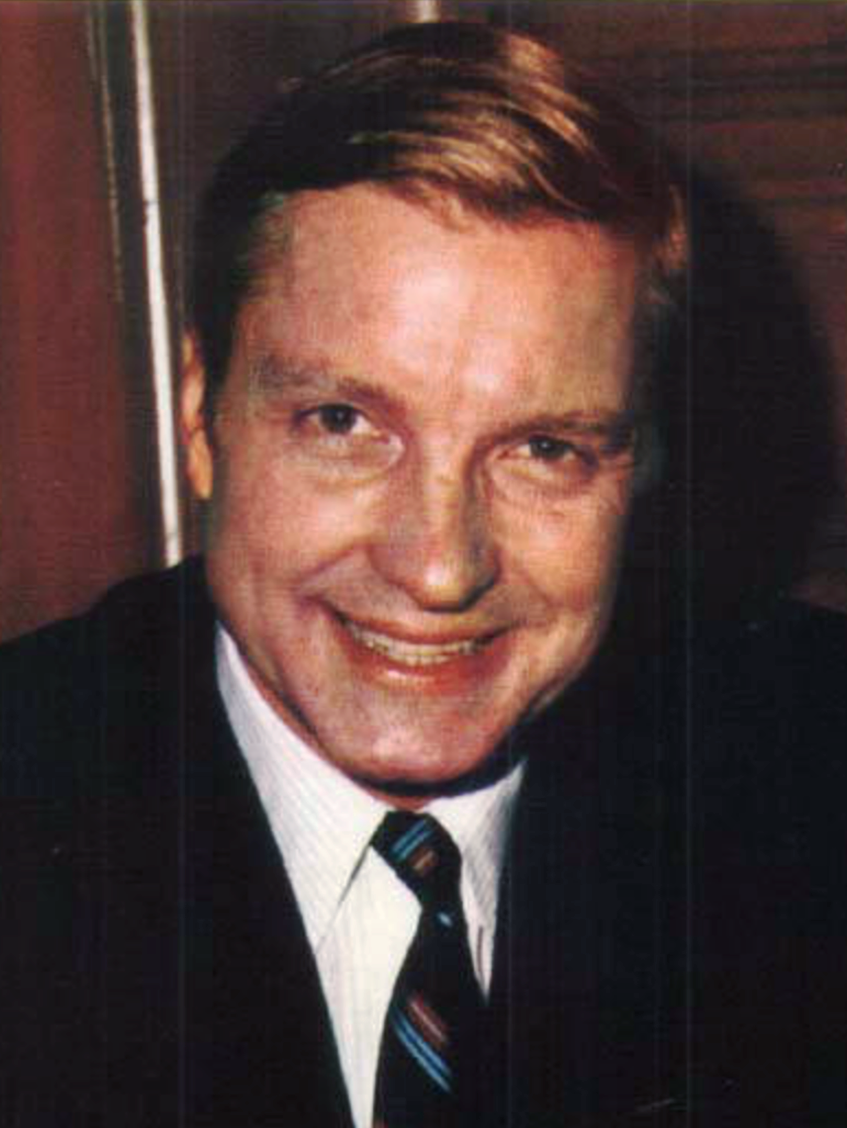

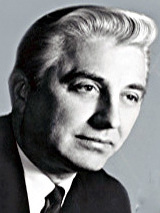
Nominee	Charles Percy	Roman Pucinski
Party	Republican	Democratic
Popular vote	2,867,078	1,721,031
Percentage	62.21%	37.35%
- County results Percy: 50-60% 60-70% 70-80%
U.S. senator before election
Charles H. Percy
Republican
Elected U.S. Senator
Charles H. Percy
Republican

Incumbent Republican Senator Charles H. Percy sought re-election. Percy was opposed by Democratic nominee Roman Pucinski, a Congressman from Illinois's 11th congressional district, Edward C. Gross (SL) and Arnold Becchetti (C). Percy handily won a second term.

1972 U.S. Senate election in Illinois
Party	Candidate	Votes	%	±%
Republican	Charles H. Percy (incumbent)	2,867,078	62.21	+7.27%
Democratic	Roman Pucinski	1,721,031	37.35	−6.55%
Socialist Labor	Edward C. Gross	13,384	0.29	
Communist	Arnold Becchetti	6,103	0.13	
Write-in		784	0.02	
Majority		1,146,047	24.87	+13.82%
Turnout		4,608,380		
Republican hold				

== Iowa ==
1972 United States Senate election in Iowa
- November 7, 1972
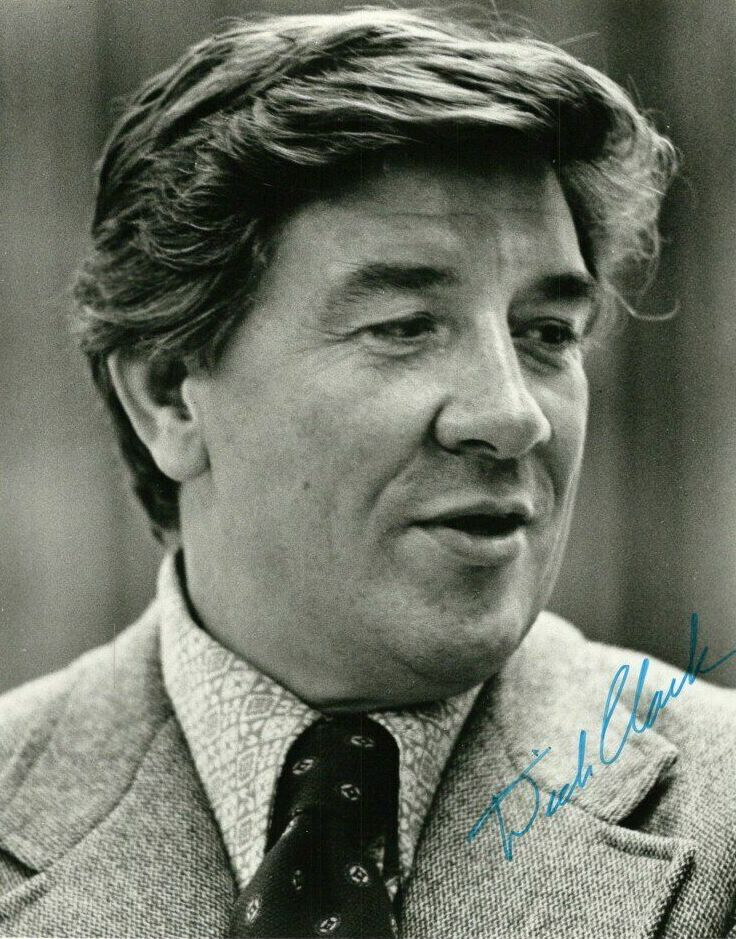

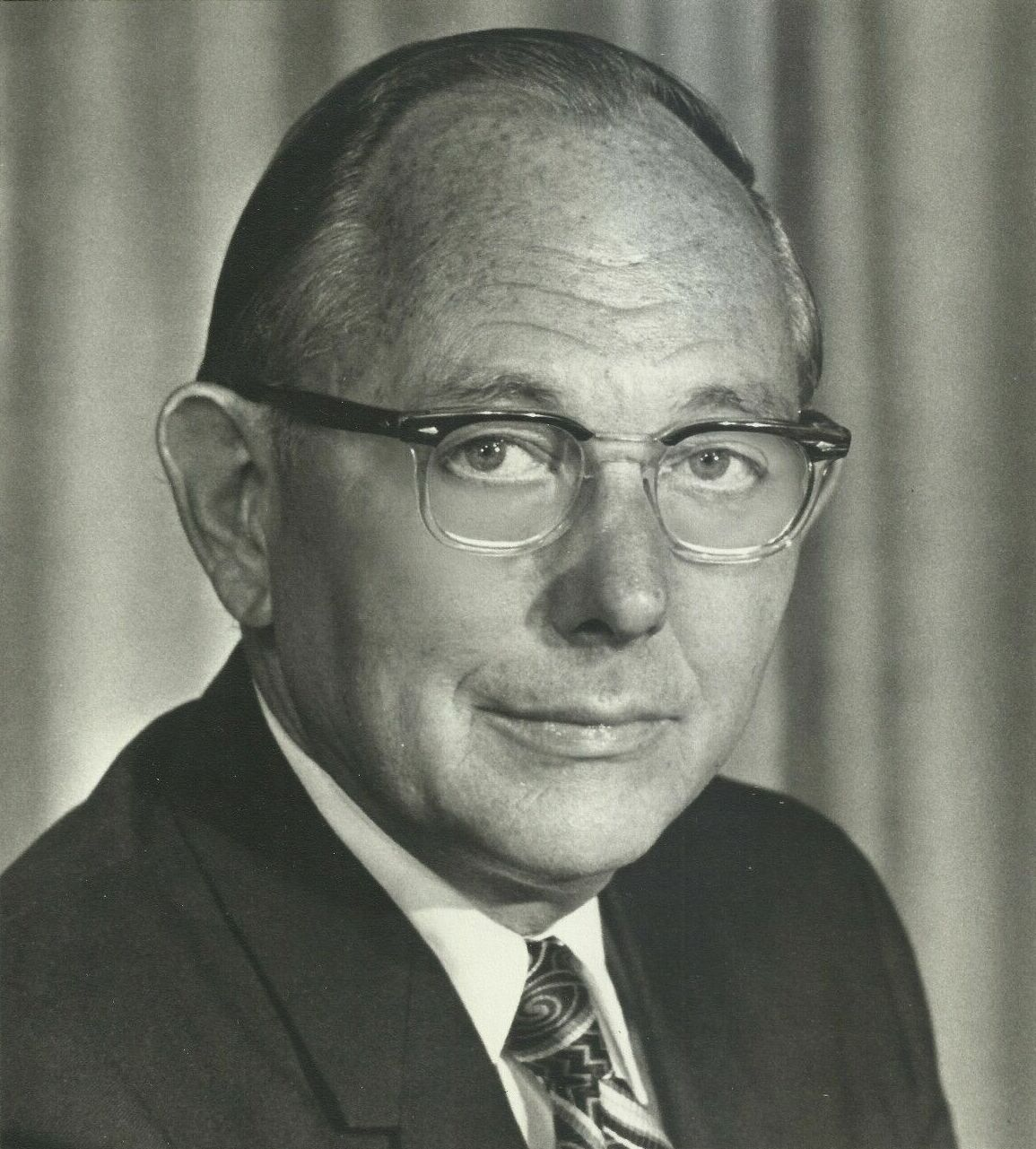
Nominee	Dick Clark	Jack Miller
Party	Democratic	Republican
Popular vote	662,637	530,525
Percentage	55.07%	44.09%
- County results Clark: 50–60% 60–70% 70–80% Miller: 50–60% 60–70%
U.S. senator before election
Jack Miller
Republican
Elected U.S. Senator
Dick Clark
Democratic

The incumbent Republican Senator Jack Miller was defeated by Dick Clark.

1972 U.S. Senate election in Iowa
Party	Candidate	Votes	%
Democratic	Dick Clark	662,637	55.07
Republican	Jack Miller (incumbent)	530,525	44.09
American	William A. Rocap Jr.	8,954	0.74
By Petition	Fred Richard Benton	1,203	0.10
None	Scattering	14	0.00
Majority		132,112	10.98
Turnout		1,203,333	
Democratic gain from Republican			

== Kansas ==
1972 United States Senate election in Kansas
- November 7, 1972
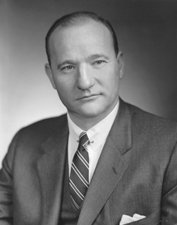

Nominee	James B. Pearson	Archibald O. Tetzlaff
Party	Republican	Democratic
Popular vote	622,591	200,764
Percentage	71.42%	23.03%
- County results Pearson: 60-70% 70-80% 80-90%
U.S. senator before election
James B. Pearson
Republican
Elected U.S. Senator
James B. Pearson
Republican

The incumbent Republican Senator James B. Pearson was re-elected.

1972 U.S. Senate election in Kansas
Party	Candidate	Votes	%
Republican	James B. Pearson (incumbent)	622,591	71.42
Democratic	Archibald O. Tetzlaff	200,764	23.03
Conservative	Gene F. Miller	35,510	4.07
Prohibition	Howard Hadin	12,857	1.47
Majority		421,827	48.39
Turnout		871,722	
Republican hold			

== Kentucky ==
1972 United States Senate election in Kentucky
- November 7, 1972
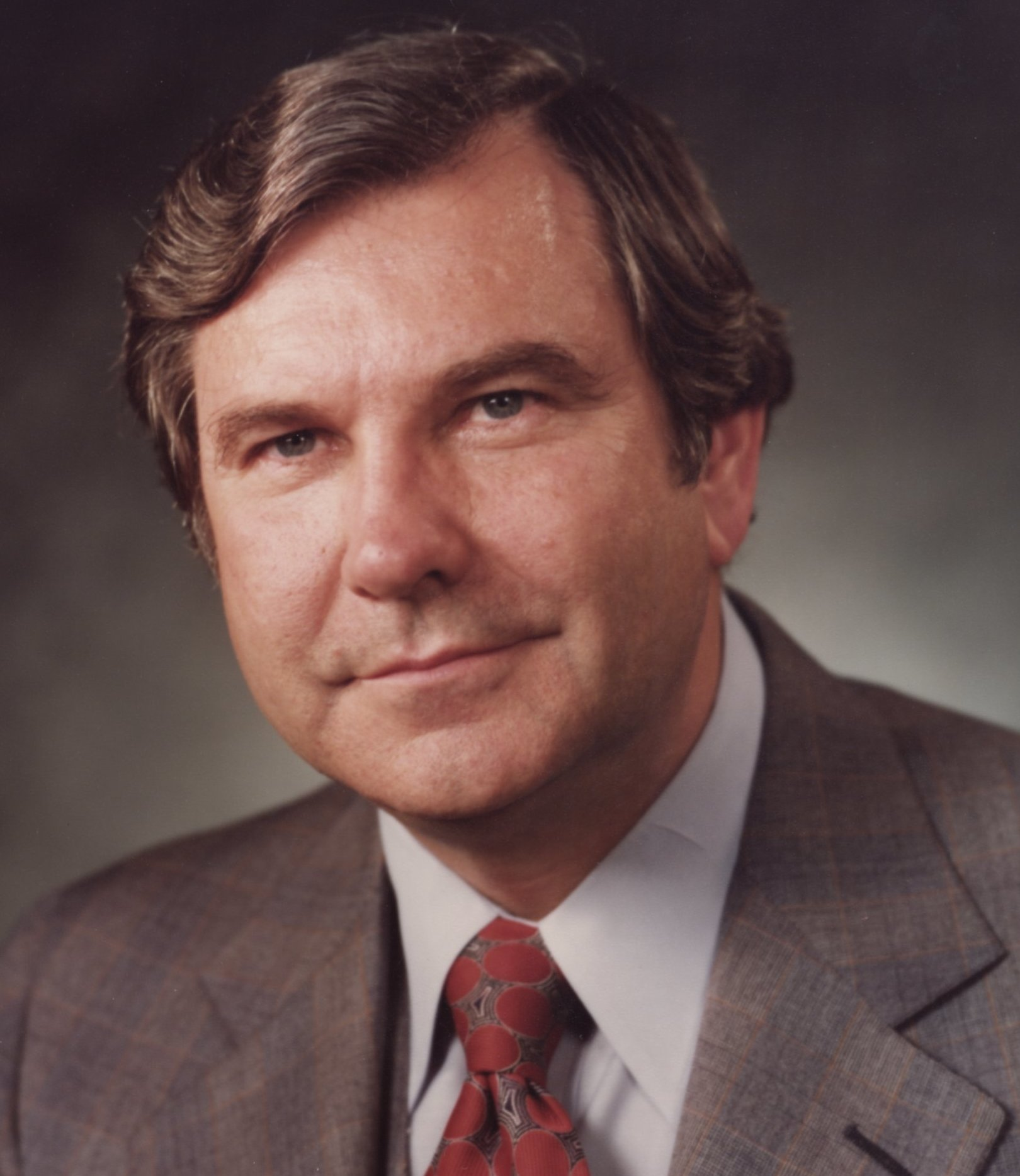

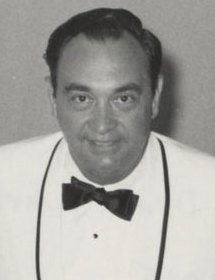
Nominee	Walter Huddleston	Louie Nunn
Party	Democratic	Republican
Popular vote	528,550	494,337
Percentage	50.93%	47.63%
- County results Huddleston: 50–60% 60–70% 70–80% Nunn: 50-60% 60-70% 70–80% 80–90%
U.S. senator before election
John Sherman Cooper
Republican
Elected U.S. Senator
Walter Huddleston
Democratic

The incumbent Republican Senator John Sherman Cooper retired, and was succeeded by Democrat Walter Dee Huddleston.

1972 U.S. Senate election in Kentucky
Party	Candidate	Votes	%
Democratic	Walter D. Huddleston	528,550	50.93
Republican	Louie B. Nunn	494,337	47.63
American	Helen Breeden	8,707	0.84
Populist	William E. Bartley Jr.	6,267	0.60
Majority		34,223	3.30
Turnout		1,037,861	
Democratic gain from Republican			

== Louisiana ==
In the midst of his campaign for a seventh term, Allen J. Ellender, the president pro tempore and chairman of the Appropriations Committee, suffered a fatal heart attack on July 27, 23 days prior to the Democratic primary. Ellender, first elected in 1936 as the permanent successor to the assassinated Huey P. Long, was slated to face former state senator and 1971 gubernatorial candidate J. Bennett Johnston and minor candidate Frank Allen in the primary.

Governor Edwin Washington Edwards, who had defeated Johnston by less than 4,500 votes in the 1971 Democratic runoff, nominated his wife, Elaine Edwards, to fill the remainder of Ellender's term, with the agreement that she would resign immediately following the general election, to allow the winner to gain seniority over other new senators.

On the same day as Edwards' inauguration on Capitol Hill, the Louisiana Democratic Party rejected a challenge by former Governor John McKeithen to reopen qualifying following Ellender's death, ordering the primary to be held August 19 as scheduled, ignoring an opinion to the contrary by Louisiana Attorney General William J. Guste Jr. Ellender's name was not removed from the ballot, and he received 10 percent of the primary vote as a tribute. McKeithen, whose eight-year gubernatorial tenure ended May 9, 1972, ran as an independent with support of the Ellender family, incensed by Johnston's primary challenge.

Johnston easily won the Democratic primary, nullifying the need for a September 30 runoff. In the general election, the Shreveport native trounced McKeithen by 32 points to win the first of his four terms. He was sworn in on November 13, 1972.

Louisiana election
- November 7, 1972
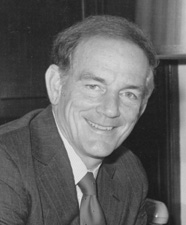

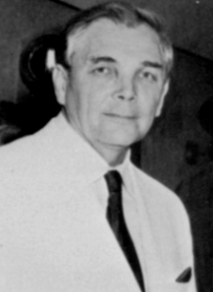

Nominee	J. Bennett Johnston	John McKeithen	Ben Toledano
Party	Democratic	Independent	Republican
Popular vote	598,987	250,161	206,846
Percentage	55.21%	23.06%	19.07%
- Parish results Johnston: 30–40% 40–50% 50–60% 60–70% McKeithen: 40-50% 50-60% 60-70%
U.S. senator before election
Elaine Edwards
Democratic
Elected U.S. Senator
J. Bennett Johnston
Democratic

1972 U.S. Senate election in Louisiana
Party	Candidate	Votes	%
Democratic	J. Bennett Johnston	598,987	55.21
Independent	John McKeithen	250,161	23.06
Republican	Ben C. Toledano	206,846	19.07
American	Hall M. Lyons	28,910	2.66
Majority		348,826	32.15
Turnout		1,084,904	
Democratic hold			

== Maine ==
1972 United States Senate election in Maine
- November 7, 1972
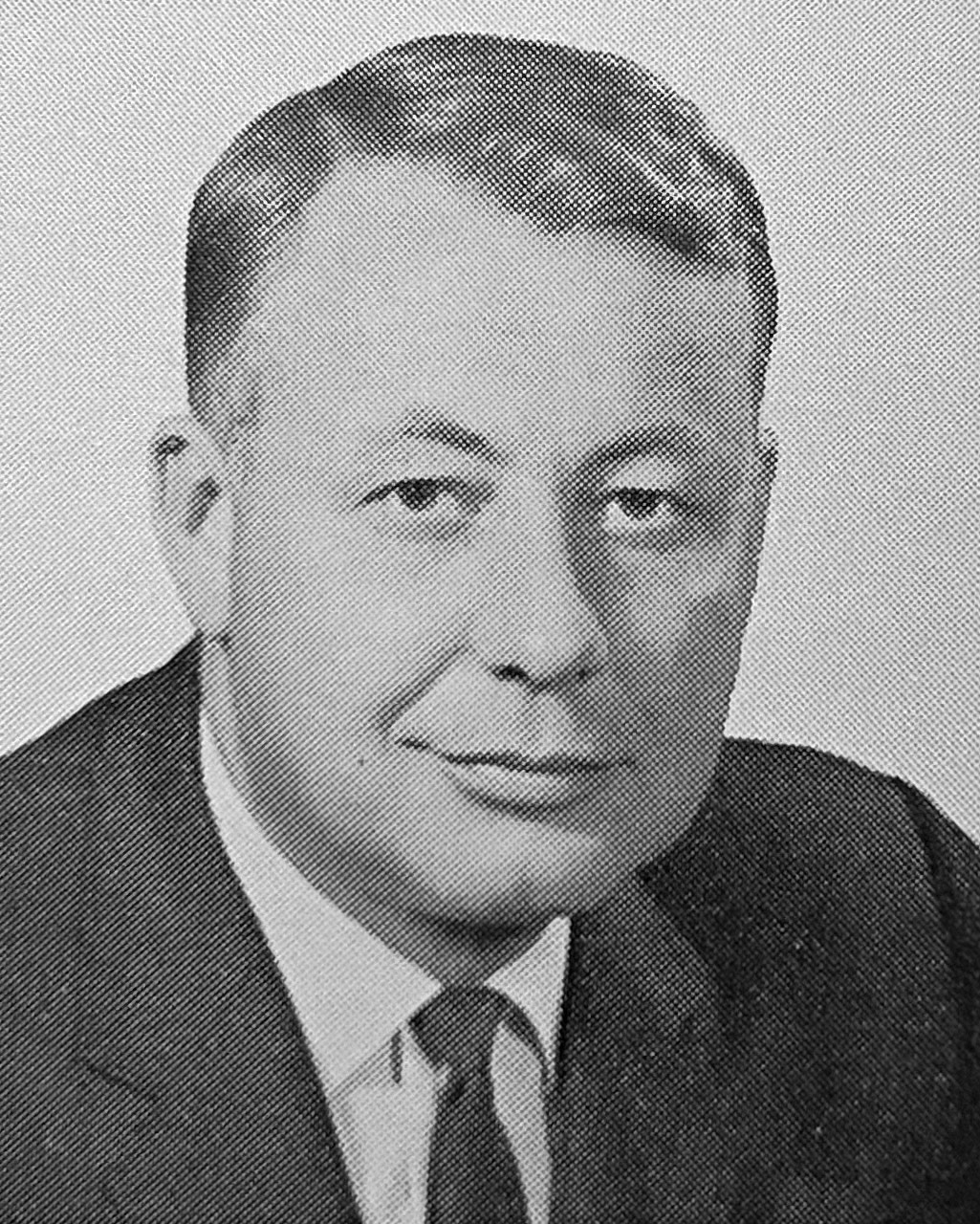

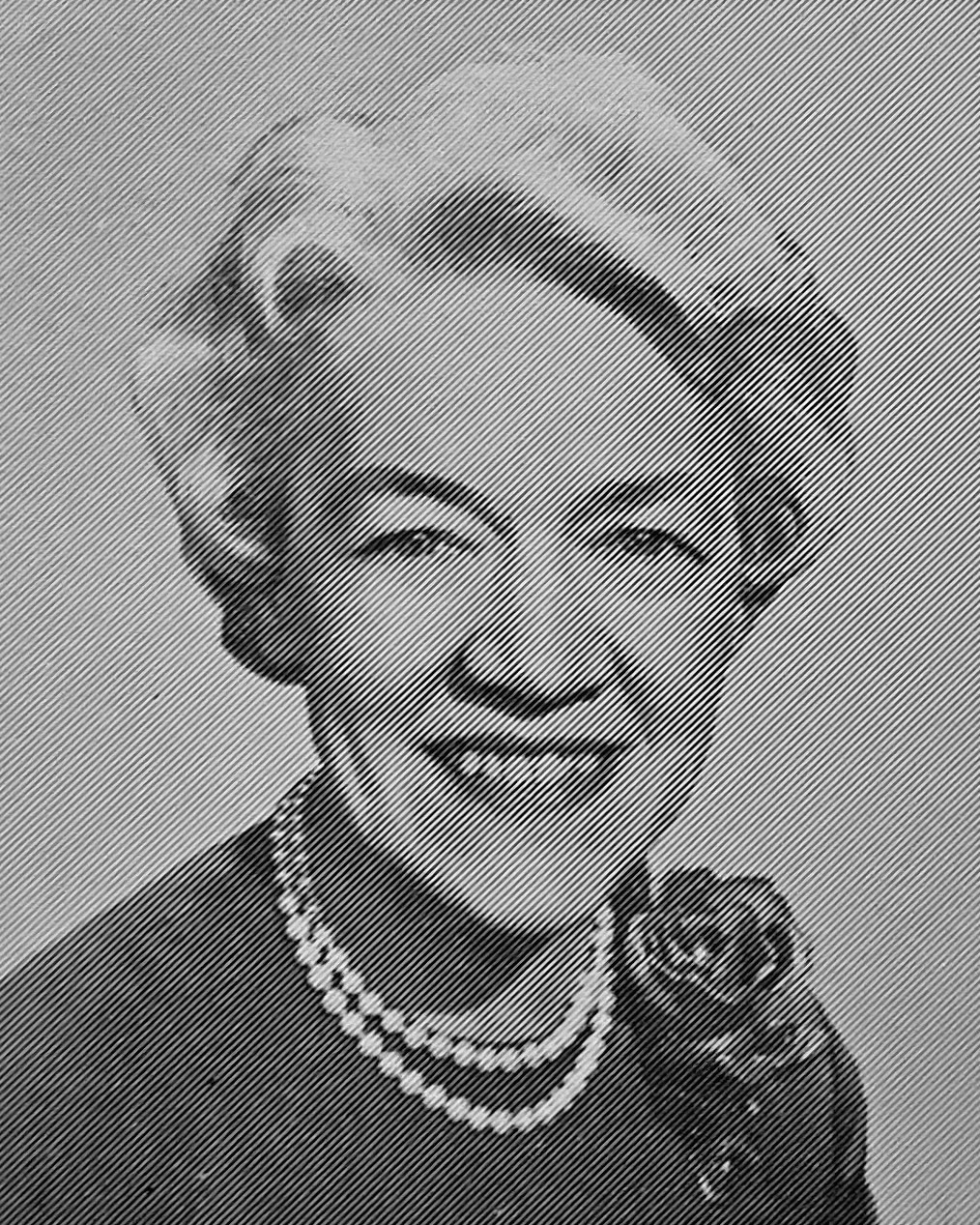
Nominee	William Hathaway	Margaret Chase Smith
Party	Democratic	Republican
Popular vote	224,270	197,040
Percentage	53.2%	46.8%
- County results Hathaway: 50–60% 60–70% Smith: 50–60% 60–70%
U.S. senator before election
Margaret Chase Smith
Republican
Elected U.S. Senator
William Hathaway
Democratic

Incumbent Republican Senator Margaret Chase Smith ran for re-election to a fifth term, but was defeated by Democrat William Hathaway, member of the U.S. House of Representatives from Maine's 2nd congressional district.

General election results
Party	Candidate	Votes	%
Democratic	William Hathaway	224,270	53.23
Republican	Margaret Chase Smith (incumbent)	197,040	46.77
Majority		27,230	6.46
Turnout		421,310	
Democratic gain from Republican			

== Massachusetts ==
Massachusetts election
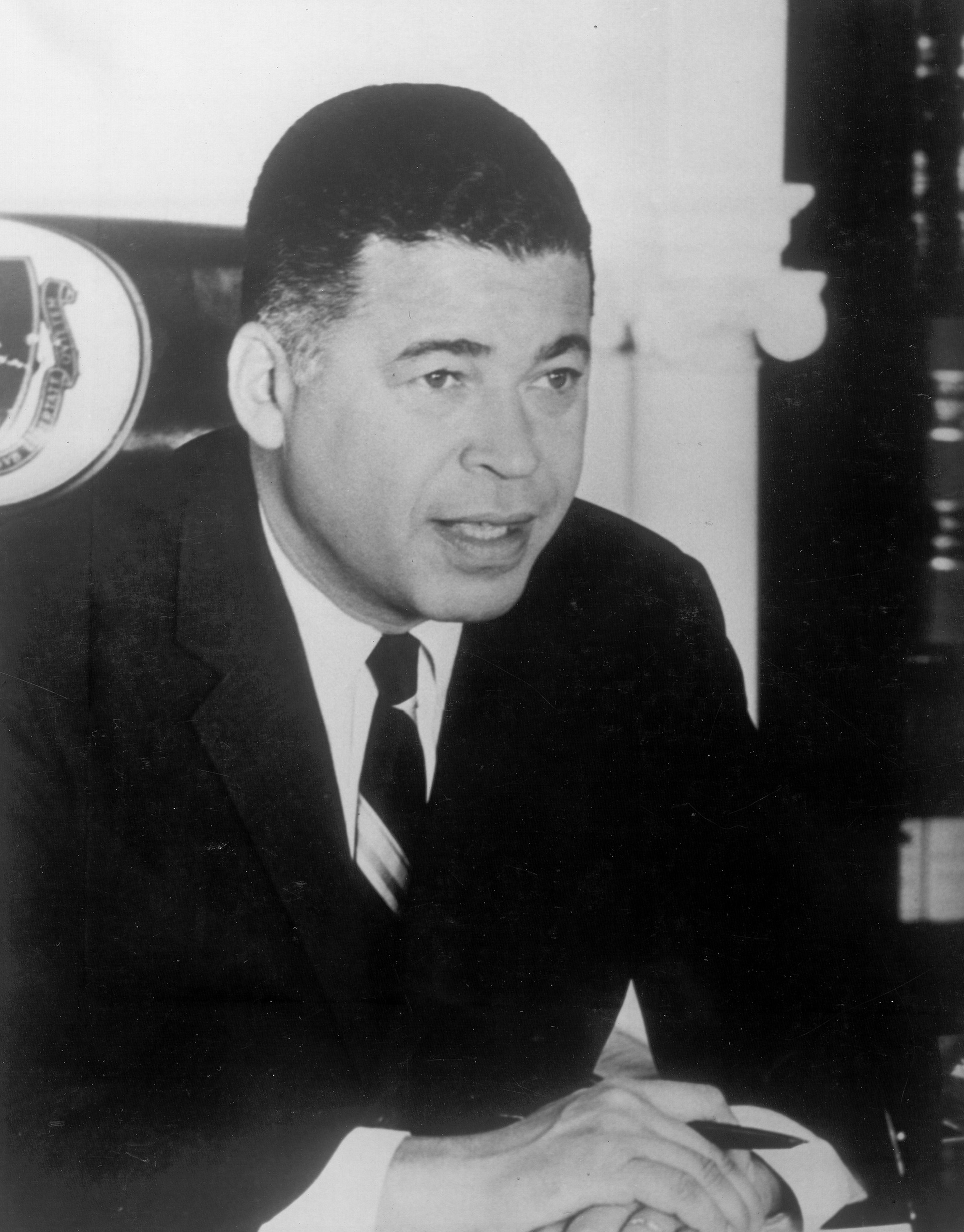

Nominee	Edward Brooke	John J. Droney
Party	Republican	Democratic
Popular vote	1,505,932	823,278
Percentage	63.53%	34.73%

Brooke
40–50%
50–60%
60–70%
70–80%
80–90%
90–100%
Droney
40–50%
50–60%
U.S. senator before election
Edward Brooke
Republican
Elected U.S. senator
Edward Brooke
Republican

Incumbent Republican Senator Edward Brooke, first elected in 1966 as the first African-American elected to the Senate by popular vote, defeated his challengers, among them: John J. Droney, the Middlesex County district attorney.

Democratic Primary
Party	Candidate	Votes	%
Democratic	John J. Droney	215,523	45.05
Democratic	Gerald O'Leary	169,876	35.51
Democratic	John P. Lynch	92,979	19.43

General election
Party	Candidate	Votes	%
Republican	Edward Brooke (incumbent)	1,505,932	63.53
Democratic	John J. Droney	823,278	34.73
Socialist Workers	Donald Gurewitz	41,369	1.75
None	Scattering	97	0.00
Majority		682,654	28.80
Turnout		2,370,676	
Republican hold			

== Michigan ==
1972 United States Senate election in Michigan
- November 7, 1972
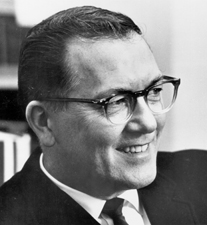

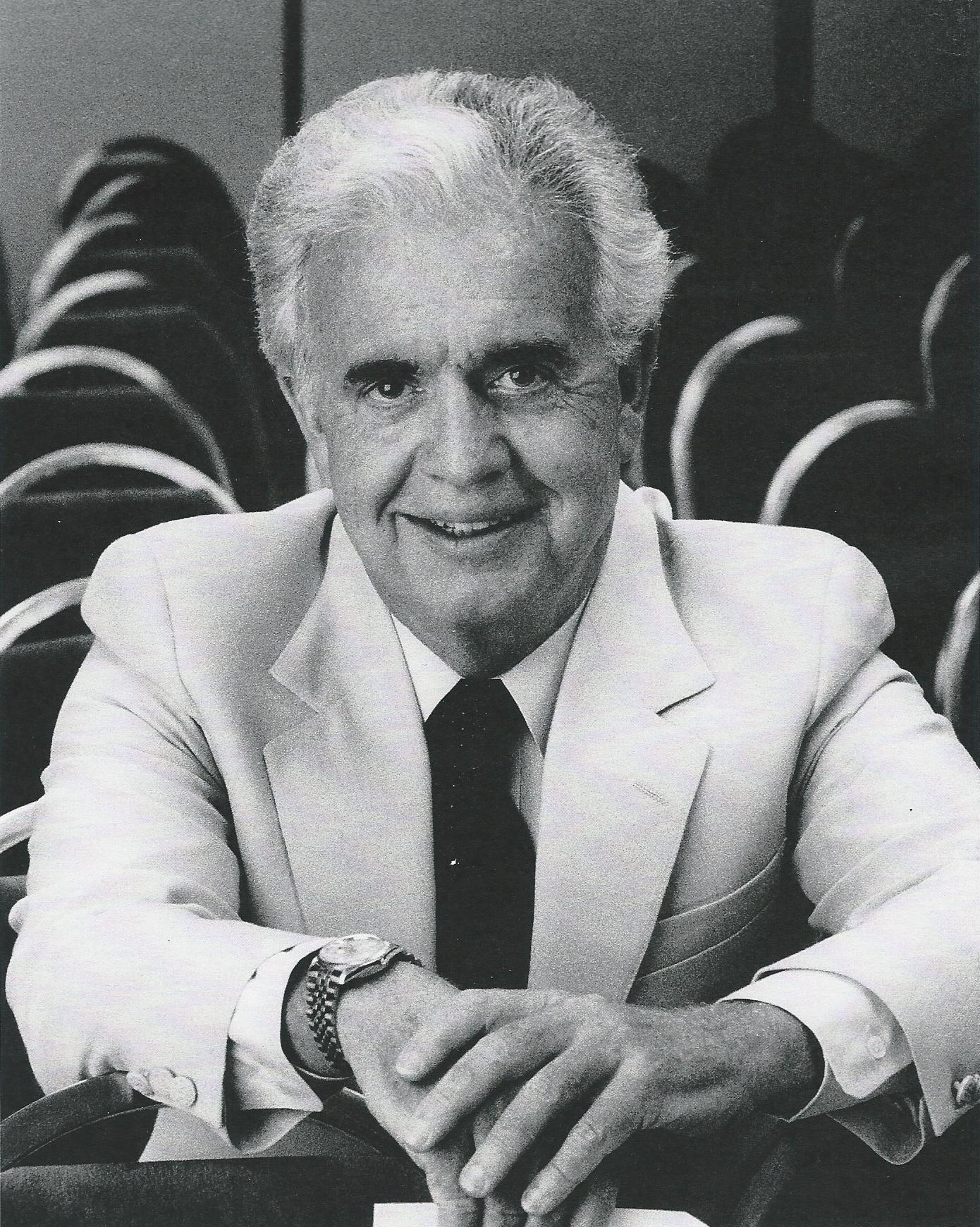
Nominee	Robert P. Griffin	Frank J. Kelley
Party	Republican	Democratic
Popular vote	1,781,065	1,577,178
Percentage	52.28%	46.29%
- County results Griffin: 50-60% 60-70% 70-80% Kelley: 50–60%
U.S. senator before election
Robert P. Griffin
Republican
Elected U.S. Senator
Robert P. Griffin
Republican

The incumbent Republican Senator Robert P. Griffin was re-elected.

1972 U.S. Senate election in Michigan
Party	Candidate	Votes	%
Republican	Robert P. Griffin (incumbent)	1,781,065	52.28
Democratic	Frank J. Kelley	1,577,178	46.29
American Independent	Patrick Dillinger	23,121	0.68
Human Rights	Barbara Halpert	19,118	0.56
Socialist Workers	Linda Nordquist	2,389	0.07
Socialist Labor	James Sim	2,217	0.06
Communist	Thomas D. Dennis Jr.	1,908	0.06
Majority		203,887	5.99
Turnout		3,406,906	
Republican hold			

== Minnesota ==
1972 United States Senate election in Minnesota
- November 7, 1972
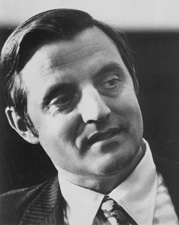

Nominee	Walter Mondale	Phil Hansen
Party	Democratic (DFL)	Republican
Popular vote	981,320	742,121
Percentage	56.67%	42.86%
- County results Mondale: 50–60% 60–70% 70–80% Hansen: 40-50% 50-60% 60-70%
U.S. senator before election
Walter Mondale
Democratic (DFL)
Elected U.S. Senator
Walter Mondale
Democratic (DFL)

Incumbent Democrat Senator Walter Mondale, who was originally appointed in 1964 (to fill the vacancy created when Hubert Humphrey was elected to the office of vice president) and elected to a full term in 1966, defeated Republican challenger Phil Hansen.

Democratic primary election results
Party	Candidate	Votes	%
Democratic (DFL)	Walter F. Mondale (incumbent)	230,679	89.88
Democratic (DFL)	Tom Griffin	11,266	4.39
Democratic (DFL)	Richard "Dick" Leaf	7,750	3.02
Democratic (DFL)	Ralph E. Franklin	6,946	2.71

Republican primary election results
Party	Candidate	Votes	%
Republican	Phil Hansen	165,093	100.00

General election results
Party	Candidate	Votes	%
Democratic (DFL)	Walter F. Mondale (incumbent)	981,320	56.67
Republican	Phil Hansen	742,121	42.86
Industrial Government	Karl H. Heck	8,192	0.47
Majority		239,199	13.81
Turnout		1,731,633	
Democratic (DFL) hold			

== Mississippi ==
1972 United States Senate election in Mississippi
- November 7, 1972
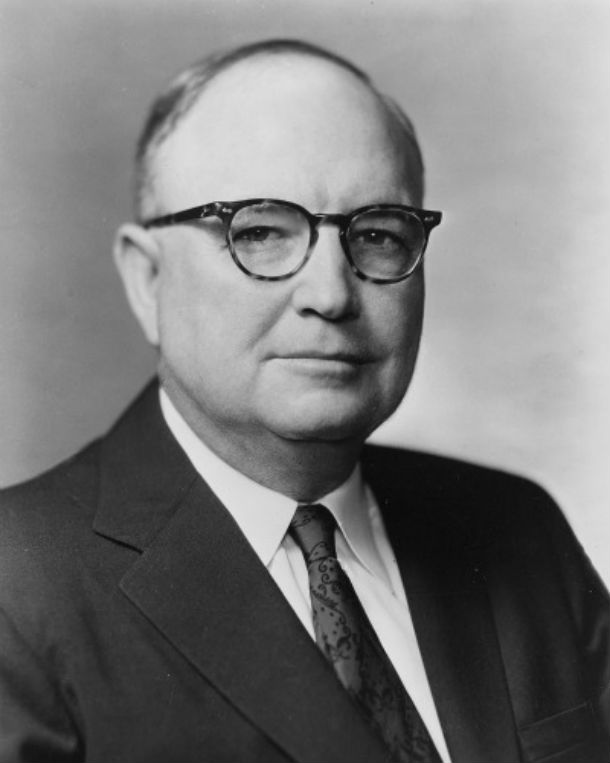

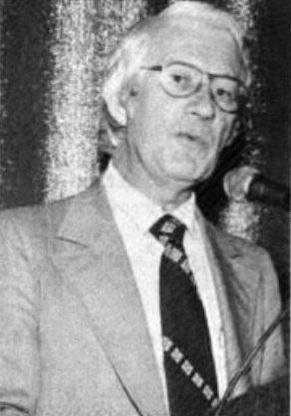
Nominee	James Eastland	Gil Carmichael
Party	Democratic	Republican
Popular vote	375,102	249,779
Percentage	58.1%	38.7%
- County results Eastland: 40-50% 50-60% 60-70% 70-80% 80-90% Carmichael: 40-50% 50-60%
U.S. senator before election
James Eastland
Democratic
Elected U.S. Senator
James Eastland
Democratic

The incumbent Democratic Senator James Eastland was re-elected.

General election results
Party	Candidate	Votes	%
Democratic	James Eastland (incumbent)	375,102	58.09
Republican	Gil Carmichael	249,779	38.68
Independent	Prentiss Walker	14,662	2.27
Independent	C. L. McKinley	6,203	0.96
Majority		126,323	19.41
Turnout		645,746	
Democratic hold			

== Montana ==
1972 United States Senate election in Montana
- November 7, 1972
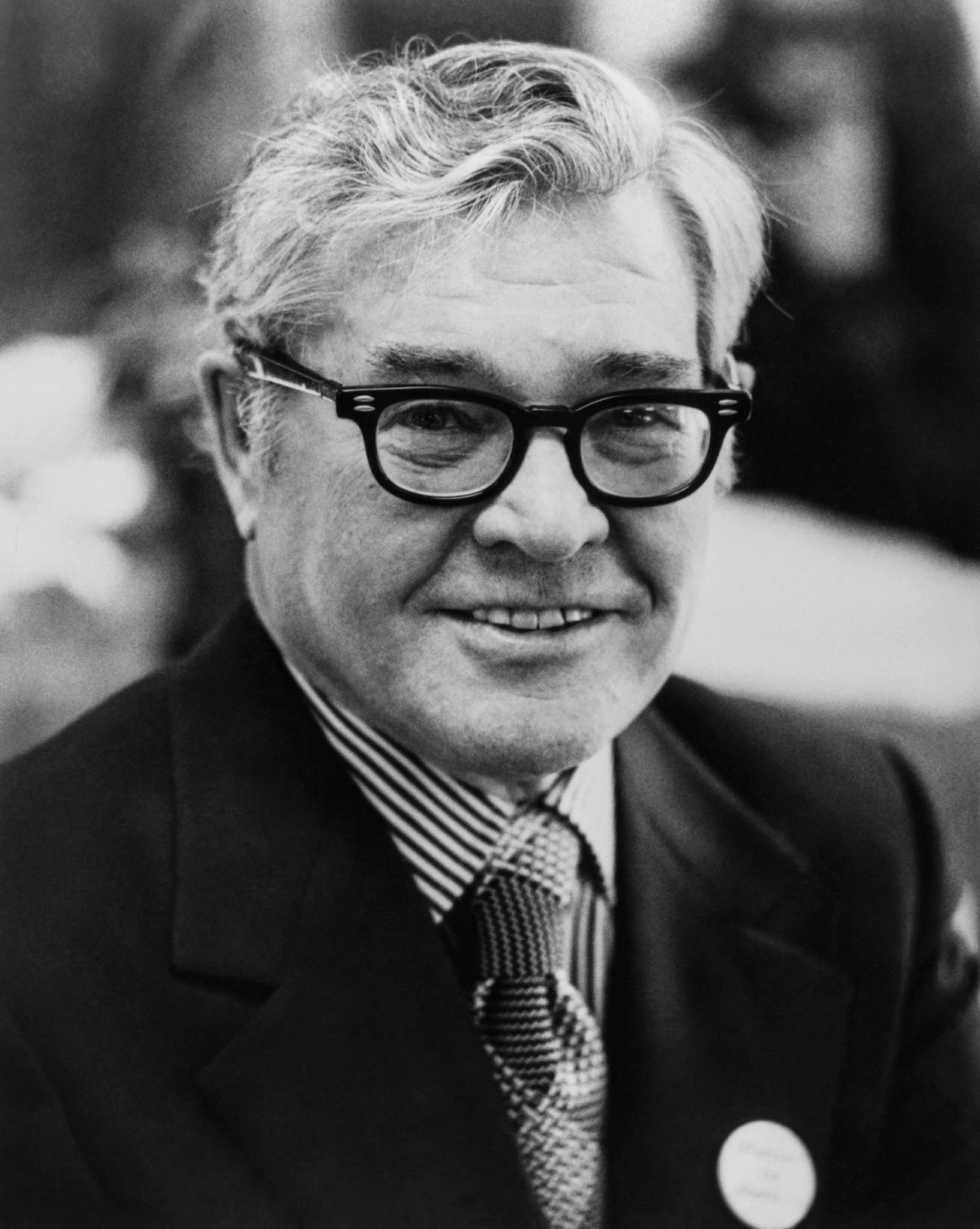

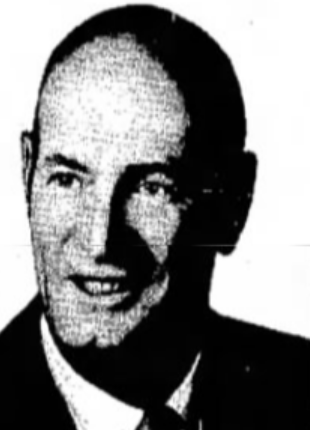
Nominee	Lee Metcalf	Hank Hibbard
Party	Democratic	Republican
Popular vote	163,609	151,316
Percentage	51.95%	48.05%
- County results Metcalf: 50–60% 60–70% 70–80% Hibbard: 50–60% 60–70% 70–80%
U.S. senator before election
Lee Metcalf
Democratic
Elected U.S. Senator
Lee Metcalf
Democratic

Incumbent Democrat Senator Lee Metcalf, who was first elected to the Senate in 1960 and was re-elected in 1966, ran for re-election. After winning the Democratic primary, he moved on to the general election, where he faced Hank Hibbard, a state senator and the Republican nominee. Following a close campaign, Metcalf managed to narrowly win re-election to his third term in the Senate over Hibbard.

Democratic Party primary results
Party	Candidate	Votes	%
Democratic	Lee Metcalf (incumbent)	106,491	86.42
Democratic	Jerome Peters	16,729	13.58
Total votes		123,220	100.00

Republican primary results
Party	Candidate	Votes	%
Republican	Hank Hibbard	43,028	49.70
Republican	Harold E. Wallace	26,463	30.57
Republican	Norman C. Wheeler	13,826	15.97
Republican	Merrill K. Riddick	3,259	3.76
Total votes		86,576	100.00

1972 U.S. Senate election in Montana
Party	Candidate	Votes	%	±%
Democratic	Lee Metcalf (incumbent)	163,609	51.95	−1.22%
Republican	Hank Hibbard	151,316	48.05	+1.22%
Majority		12,293	3.90	−2.43%
Turnout		314,925		
Democratic hold				

== Nebraska ==
1972 United States Senate election in Nebraska
- November 7, 1972
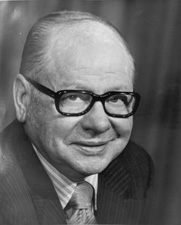

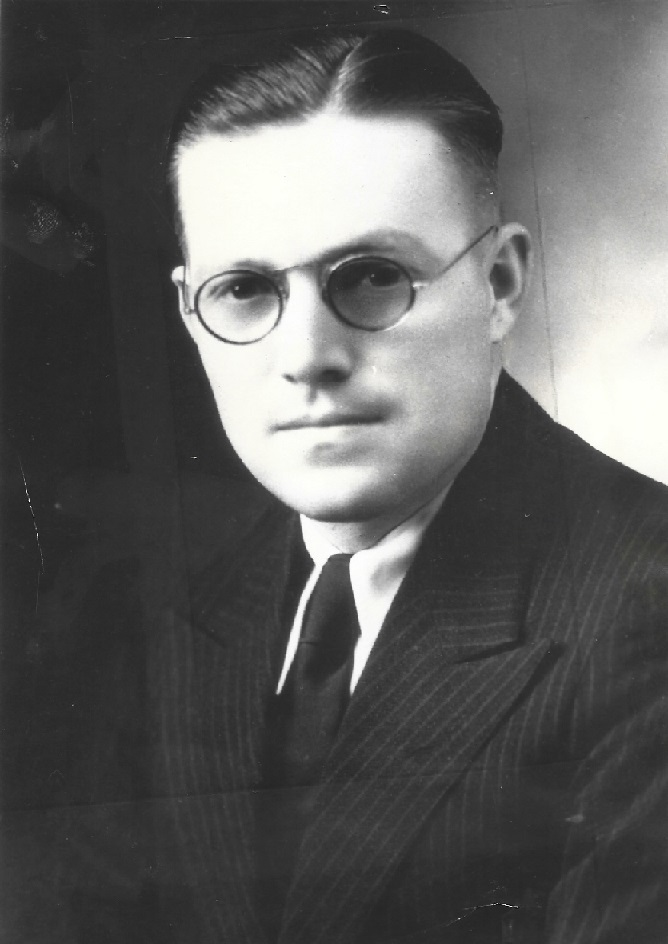
Nominee	Carl Curtis	Terry Carpenter
Party	Republican	Democratic
Popular vote	301,841	265,922
Percentage	53.16%	46.84%
- County results Curtis: 50–60% 60–70% 70–80% Carpenter: 50–60% 60–70%
U.S. senator before election
Carl Curtis
Republican
Elected U.S. Senator
Carl Curtis
Republican

Incumbent Republican Senator Carl Curtis won re-election over former congressman Terry Carpenter.

1972 U.S. Senate election in Nebraska
Party	Candidate	Votes	%	±%
Republican	Carl Curtis (incumbent)	301,841	53.16	−7.88%
Democratic	Terry Carpenter	265,922	46.84	+8.09%
Majority		35,919	6.33	−15.97%
Turnout		567,763		
Republican hold				

== New Hampshire ==
1972 United States Senate election in New Hampshire
- November 7, 1972
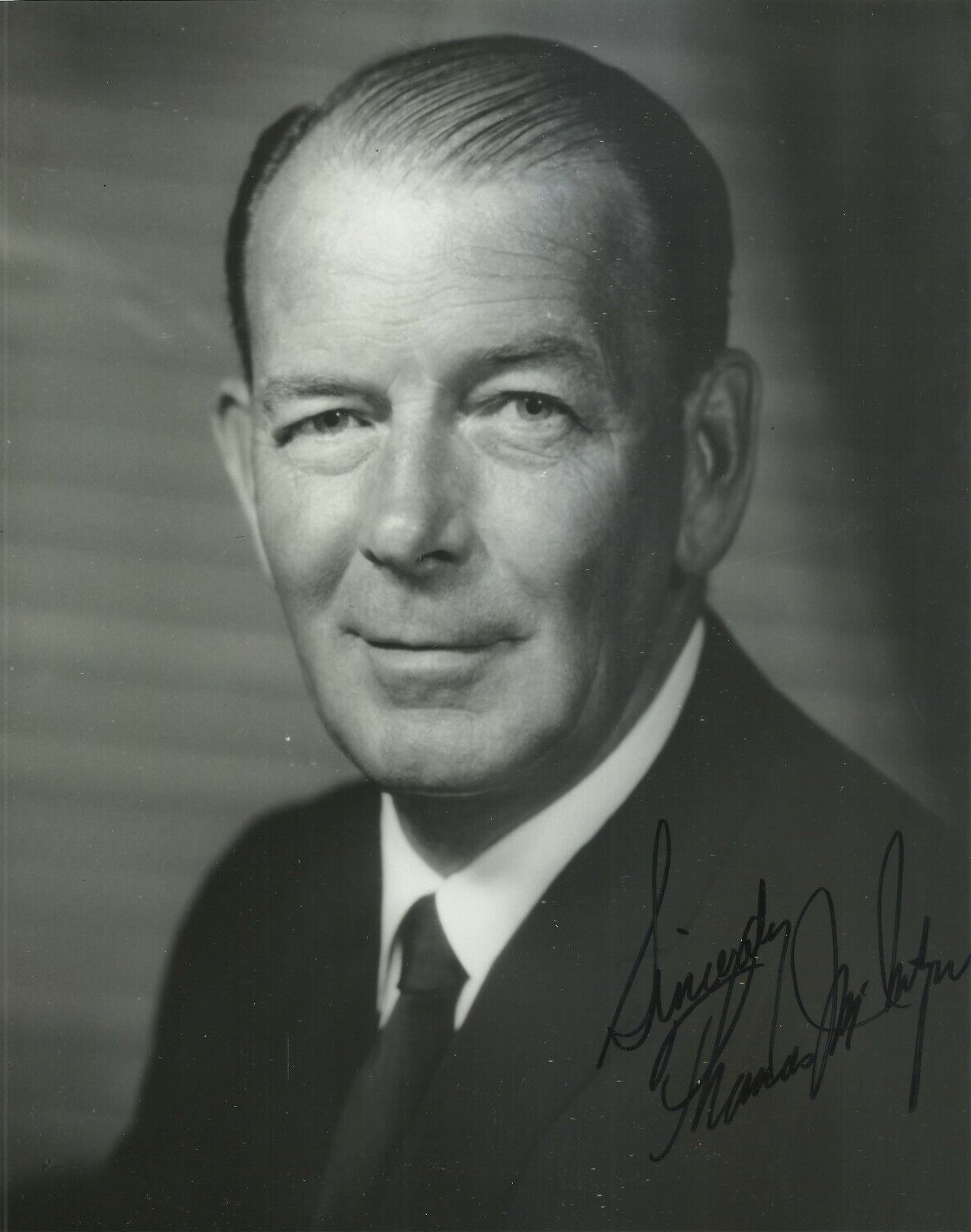

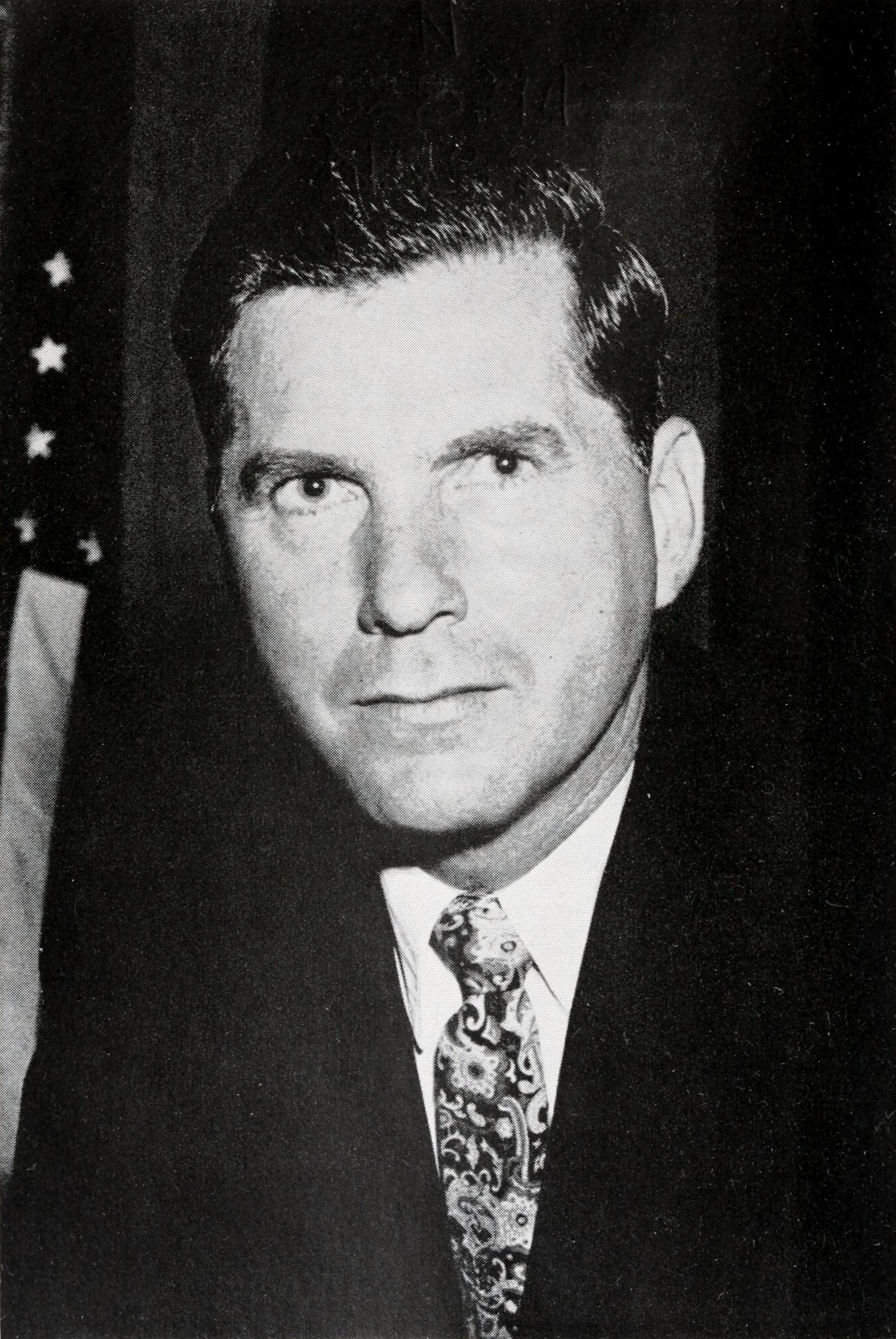
Nominee	Thomas J. McIntyre	Wesley Powell
Party	Democratic	Republican
Popular vote	184,495	139,852
Percentage	56.88%	43.12%
- McIntyre: 40–50% 50–60% 60–70% 70–80% 90-100% Powell: 50–60% 60–70% 70–80% 80–90% 90-100% No data/vote
U.S. senator before election
Thomas J. McIntyre
Democratic
Elected U.S. Senator
Thomas J. McIntyre
Democratic

The incumbent Democratic Senator Thomas J. McIntyre was re-elected.

1972 U.S. Senate election in New Hampshire
Party	Candidate	Votes	%
Democratic	Thomas J. McIntyre (incumbent)	184,495	56.88
Republican	Wesley Powell	139,852	43.12
None	Scattering	7	0.00
Majority		44,643	13.76
Turnout		324,354	
Democratic hold			

== New Jersey ==
1972 United States Senate election in New Jersey
- November 7, 1972
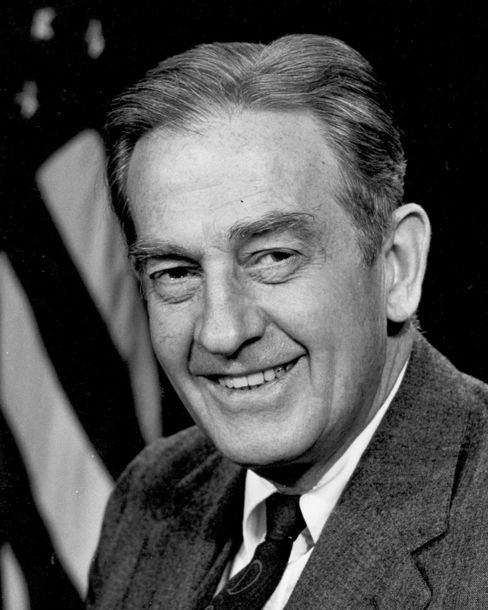

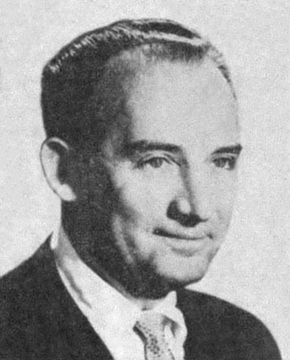
Nominee	Clifford P. Case	Paul J. Krebs
Party	Republican	Democratic
Popular vote	1,743,854	963,573
Percentage	62.46%	34.51%
- County results Case: 50-60% 60-70% 70-80%
U.S. senator before election
Clifford P. Case
Republican
Elected U.S. Senator
Clifford P. Case
Republican

The incumbent Republican Senator Clifford P. Case was re-elected.

1972 U.S. Senate election in New Jersey
Party	Candidate	Votes	%
Republican	Clifford P. Case (incumbent)	1,743,854	62.46
Democratic	Paul J. Krebs	963,753	34.52
American	A. Howard Freund	40,980	1.47
Concerned Voter's Voice	Charles W. Wiley	33,442	1.20
Socialist Labor	Julius Levin	10,058	0.36
Majority		780,101	27.94
Turnout		2,792,087	
Republican hold			

== New Mexico ==
1972 United States Senate election in New Mexico
- November 7, 1972
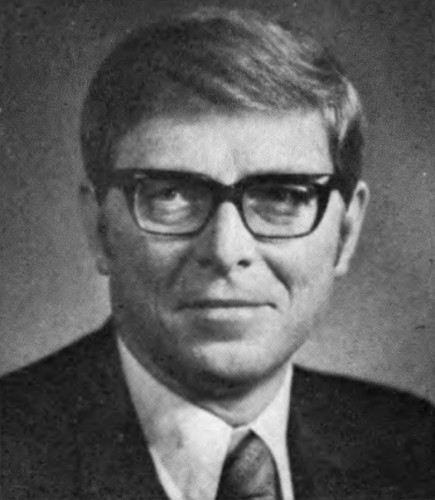

Nominee	Pete Domenici	Jack Daniels
Party	Republican	Democratic
Popular vote	204,253	173,815
Percentage	54.0%	46.0%
- County results Domenici: 50–60% 60–70% Daniels: 50–60% 60–70%
U.S. senator before election
Clinton Anderson
Democratic
Elected U.S. Senator
Pete Domenici
Republican

The incumbent Democratic Senator Clinton Presba Anderson retired, and was succeeded by Republican Pete Domenici.

1972 U.S. Senate election in New Mexico
Party	Candidate	Votes	%
Republican	Pete Domenici	204,253	54.03
Democratic	Jack Daniels	173,815	45.97
Majority		30,438	8.06
Turnout		378,068	
Republican gain from Democratic			

== North Carolina ==
1972 United States Senate election in North Carolina
- November 7, 1972
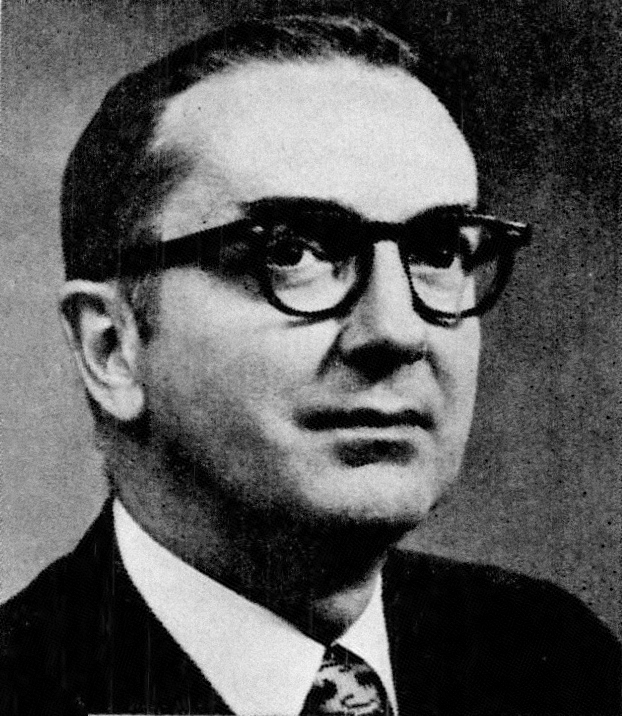

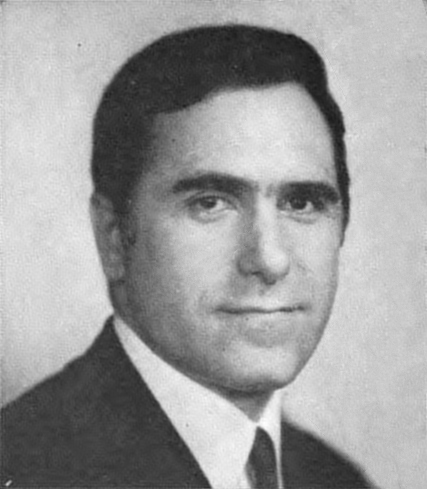
Nominee	Jesse Helms	Nick Galifianakis
Party	Republican	Democratic
Popular vote	795,247	677,293
Percentage	54.0%	46.0%
- County results Helms: 50–60% 60–70% 70–80% Galifianakis: 50–60% 60–70% 70–80%
U.S. senator before election
B. Everett Jordan
Democratic
Elected U.S. Senator
Jesse Helms
Republican

The incumbent Democratic Senator B. Everett Jordan was defeated in the primary by Nick Galifianakis. Galifianakis lost the election to Jesse Helms, making Helms the first Republican senator from the state in the 20th century.

1972 Democratic Senate primary
Party	Candidate	Votes	%
Democratic	Nick Galifianakis	377,993	49.25%
Democratic	B. Everett Jordan (incumbent)	340,391	44.35%
Democratic	J. R. Brown	27,009	3.52%
Democratic	Eugene Grace	22,156	2.89%
Total votes		767,549	100.00%

1972 Democratic Senate runoff
Party	Candidate	Votes	%	±%
Democratic	Nick Galifianakis	338,558	55.82%	▲6.57
Democratic	B. Everett Jordan (incumbent)	267,997	44.18%	▼0.17
Total votes		606,555	100.00%	

1972 Republican Senate primary
Party	Candidate	Votes	%
Republican	Jesse Helms	92,496	60.13%
Republican	James Johnson	45,303	29.45%
Republican	William Booe	16,032	10.42%
Total votes		153,831	100.00%

1972 U.S. Senate election in North Carolina
Party	Candidate	Votes	%
Republican	Jesse Helms	795,248	54.01
Democratic	Nick Galifianakis	677,293	45.99
Majority		117,955	8.02
Turnout		1,472,541	
Republican gain from Democratic			

== Oklahoma ==
1972 United States Senate election in Oklahoma
- November 7, 1972
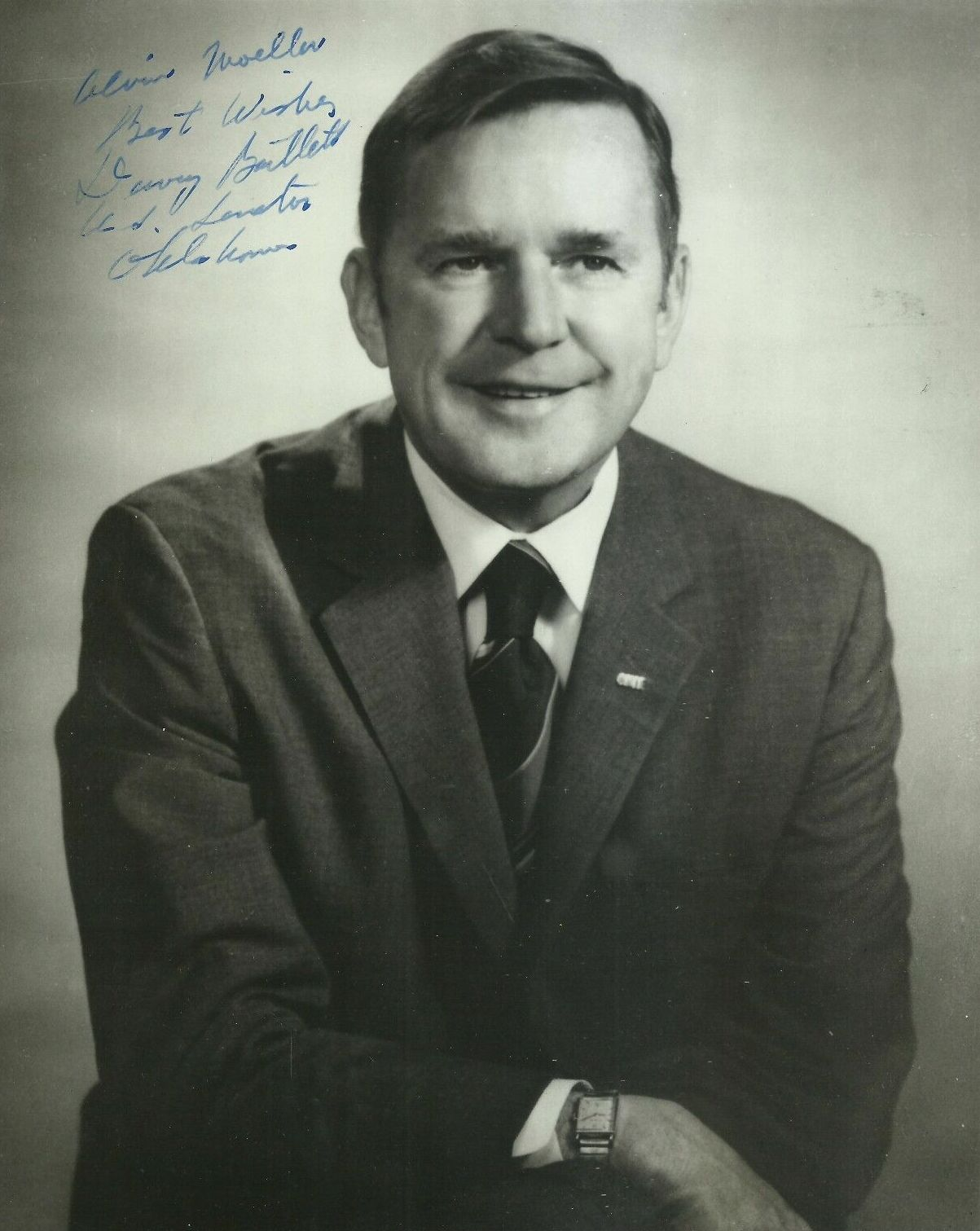

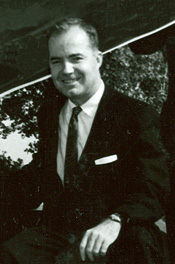
Nominee	Dewey F. Bartlett	Ed Edmondson
Party	Republican	Democratic
Popular vote	516,934	478,212
Percentage	51.43%	47.58%
- County results Bartlett: 50–60% 60–70% Edmondson: 50–60% 60–70%
U.S. senator before election
Fred R. Harris
Democratic
Elected U.S. Senator
Dewey F. Bartlett
Republican

The incumbent Democratic Senator Fred R. Harris retired, and was succeeded by Republican Dewey F. Bartlett.

1972 U.S. Senate election in Oklahoma
Party	Candidate	Votes	%
Republican	Dewey F. Bartlett	516,934	51.43
Democratic	Ed Edmondson	478,212	47.58
American	William G. Roach	5,769	0.57
Independent	Joe C. Phillips	2,264	0.23
Independent	Paul E. Trent	1,969	0.20
Majority		38,722	3.85
Turnout		1,005,148	
Republican gain from Democratic			

== Oregon ==
1972 United States Senate election in Oregon
- November 7, 1972
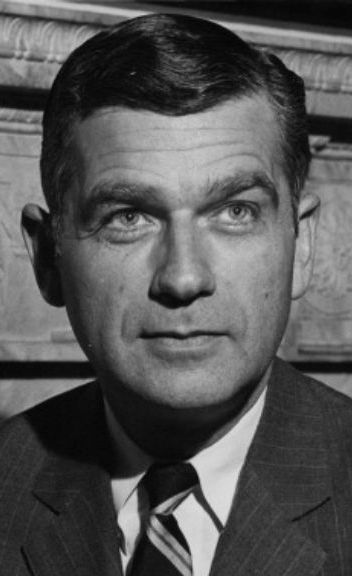

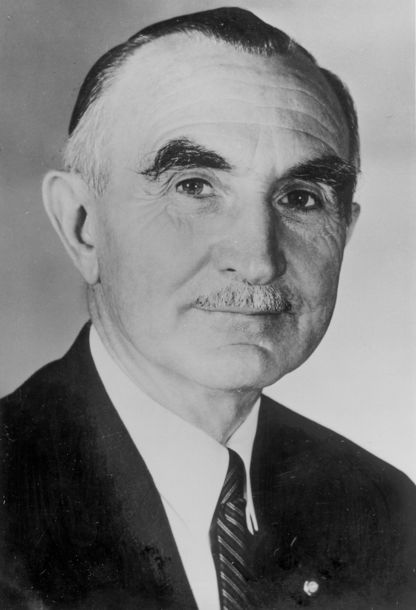
Nominee	Mark Hatfield	Wayne Morse
Party	Republican	Democratic
Popular vote	494,671	425,036
Percentage	53.72%	46.16%
- County results Hatfield: 50-60% 60-70% Morse: 50–60%
U.S. senator before election
Mark Hatfield
Republican
Elected U.S. Senator
Mark Hatfield
Republican

The incumbent Republican Senator Mark Hatfield was re-elected.

1972 U.S. Senate election in Oregon
Party	Candidate	Votes	%
Republican	Mark Hatfield (incumbent)	494,671	53.72
Democratic	Wayne Morse	425,036	46.16
None	Write-ins	1,126	0.12
Majority		69,635	7.56
Turnout		920,833	
Republican hold			

== Rhode Island ==
1972 United States Senate election in Rhode Island
- November 7, 1972
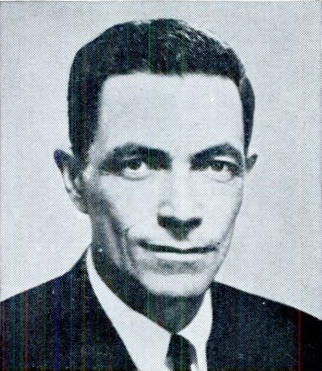

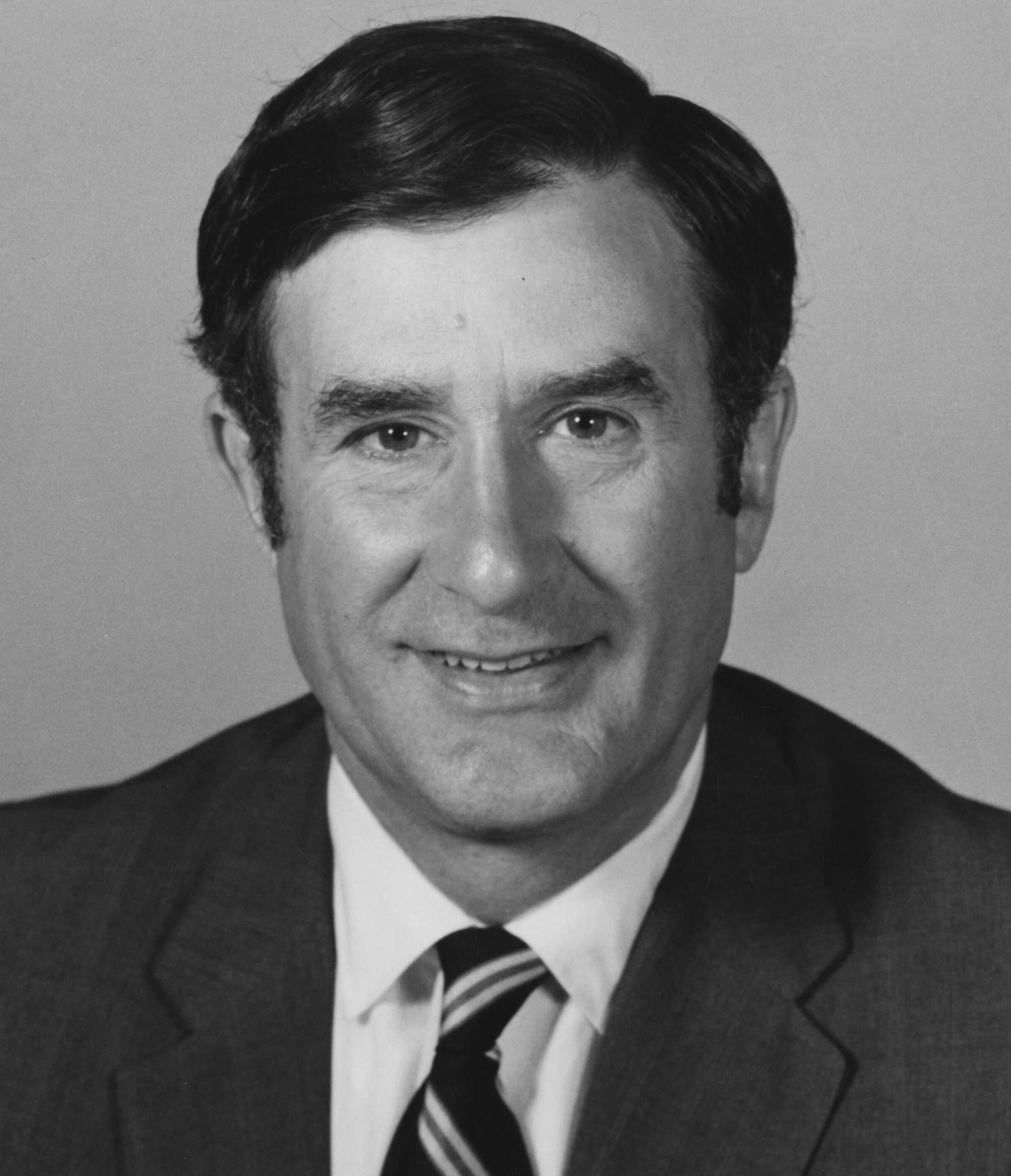
Nominee	Claiborne Pell	John Chafee
Party	Democratic	Republican
Popular vote	221,942	188,990
Percentage	53.7%	45.7%
- Pell: 40–50% 50–60% 60–70% Chafee: 40–50% 50–60% 60–70%
U.S. senator before election
Claiborne Pell
Democratic
Elected U.S. Senator
Claiborne Pell
Democratic

The incumbent Democratic Senator Claiborne Pell was re-elected.

1972 U.S. Senate election in Rhode Island
Party	Candidate	Votes	%
Democratic	Claiborne Pell (incumbent)	221,942	53.68
Republican	John Chafee	188,990	45.71
Independent	John Quattrocchi	2,041	0.49
Socialist Workers	Patrick M. DeTemple	458	0.11
Majority		32,952	7.97
Turnout		413,431	
Democratic hold			

== South Carolina ==
1972 United States Senate election in South Carolina
- November 7, 1972
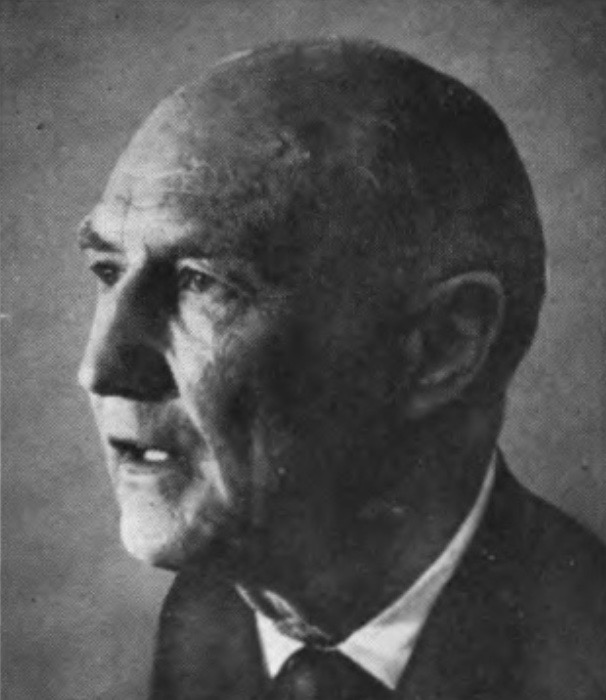

Nominee	Strom Thurmond	Eugene N. Zeigler
Party	Republican	Democratic
Popular vote	415,806	241,056
Percentage	63.3%	36.7%
- County results Thurmond: 50-59% 60-69% 70-79% Zeigler: 50-59%
U.S. senator before election
Strom Thurmond
Republican
Elected U.S. Senator
Strom Thurmond
Republican

The incumbent Republican Senator Strom Thurmond was re-elected.

1972 U.S. Senate election in South Carolina
Party	Candidate	Votes	%
Republican	Strom Thurmond (incumbent)	415,806	63.29
Democratic	Eugene N. Zeigler	241,056	36.69
None	Write-ins	172	0.03
Majority		174,750	27.60
Turnout		657,034	
Republican hold			

== South Dakota ==
1972 United States Senate election in South Dakota
- November 7, 1972
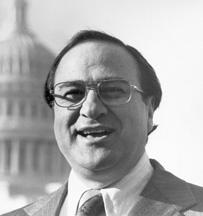

Nominee	James Abourezk	Robert W. Hirsch
Party	Democratic	Republican
Popular vote	174,773	131,613
Percentage	57.04%	42.96%
- County results Abourezk: 50–60% 60–70% 80–90% Hirsch: 50–60% 70–80%
U.S. senator before election
Karl E. Mundt
Republican
Elected U.S. Senator
James Abourezk
Democratic

The incumbent Republican Senator Karl E. Mundt retired, and was succeeded by James Abourezk.

1972 U.S. Senate election in South Dakota
Party	Candidate	Votes	%
Democratic	James Abourezk	174,773	57.04
Republican	Robert W. Hirsch	131,613	42.96
Majority		43,160	14.08
Turnout		306,386	
Democratic gain from Republican			

== Tennessee ==
1972 United States Senate election in Tennessee
- November 7, 1972
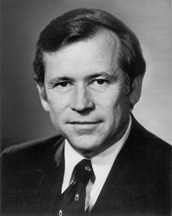

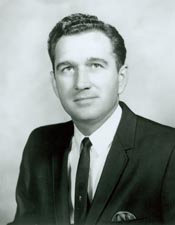
Nominee	Howard Baker	Ray Blanton
Party	Republican	Democratic
Popular vote	716,539	440,599
Percentage	61.5%	37.8%
- County results Baker: 40–50% 50–60% 60–70% 70–80% 80–90% Blanton: 40–50% 50–60% 60–70%
Senator before election
Howard Baker
Republican
Elected Senator
Howard Baker
Republican

One-term Republican Howard Baker was re-elected. He defeated Democrat Ray Blanton.

1972 U.S. Senate election in Tennessee
Party	Candidate	Votes	%	±%
Republican	Howard Baker (incumbent)	716,539	61.55	+5.85%
Democratic	Ray Blanton	440,599	37.85	+6.46%
Independent	Dan East	7,026	0.60	n/a
None	Write-ins	31	0.00	n/a
Majority		275,940	23.70	+12.30%
Turnout		1,164,195		
Republican hold				

== Texas ==
1972 United States Senate election in Texas
- November 7, 1972
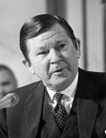

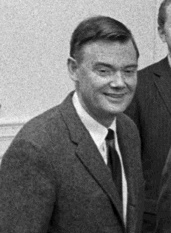
Nominee	John Tower	Barefoot Sanders
Party	Republican	Democratic
Popular vote	1,822,877	1,511,985
Percentage	53.4%	44.3%
- County results Tower: 40–50% 50-60% 60-70% 70-80% Sanders: 30–40% 40–50% 50–60% 60–70% 70–80% 80–90% Amaya: 40–30%
U.S. senator before election
John Tower
Republican
Elected U.S. Senator
John Tower
Republican

Incumbent Senator Republican John Tower was re-elected.

1972 U.S. Senate election in Texas
Party	Candidate	Votes	%
Republican	John Tower (incumbent)	1,822,877	53.40
Democratic	Barefoot Sanders	1,511,985	44.29
Raza Unida	Flores N. Amaya	63,543	1.86
Socialist Workers	Tom Leonard	14,464	0.42
Write-in	Write-ins	1,034	0.03
Majority		310,892	9.11
Turnout		3,413,903	
Republican hold			

== Vermont (special) ==
1972 United States Senate special election in Vermont
- January 7, 1972
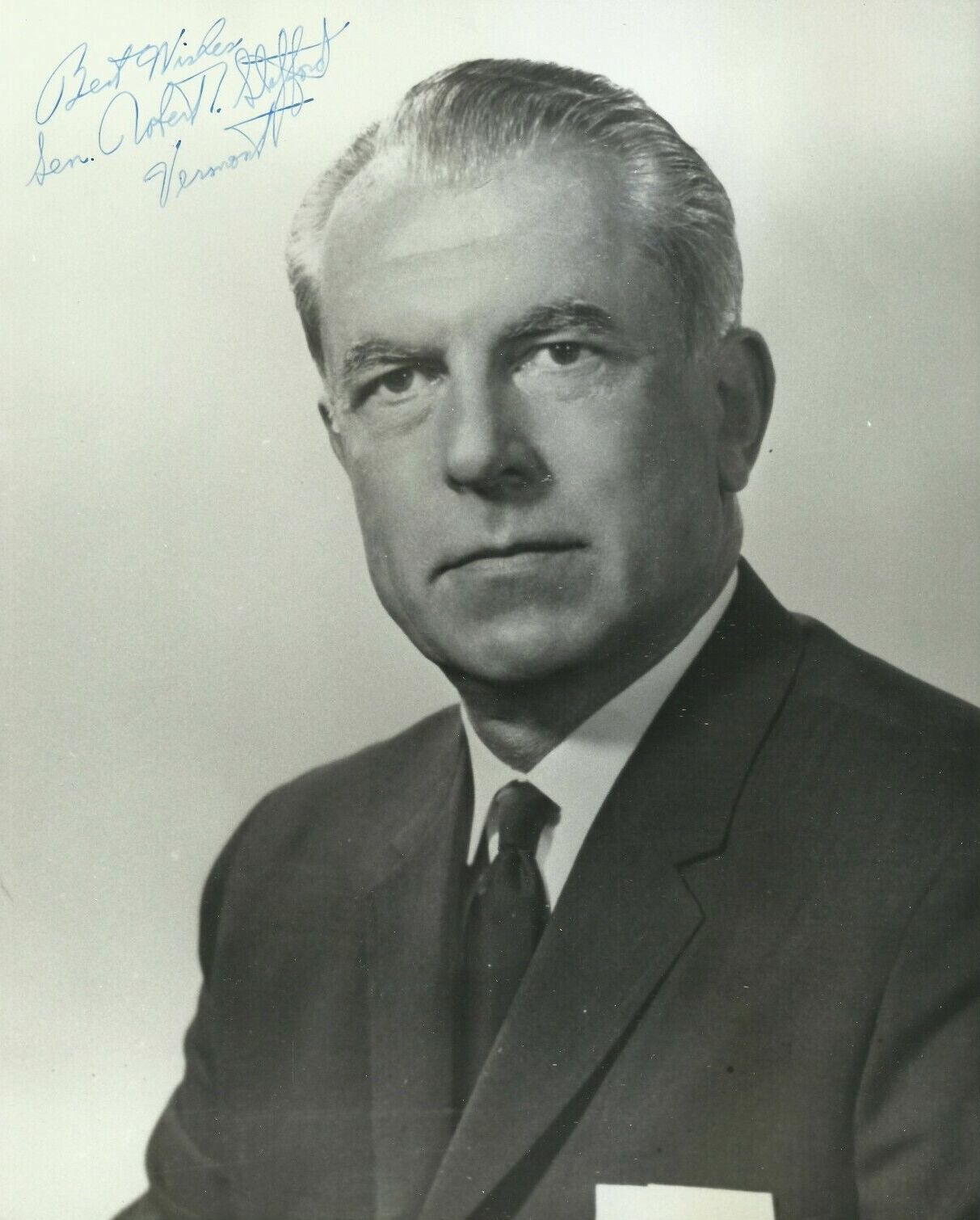

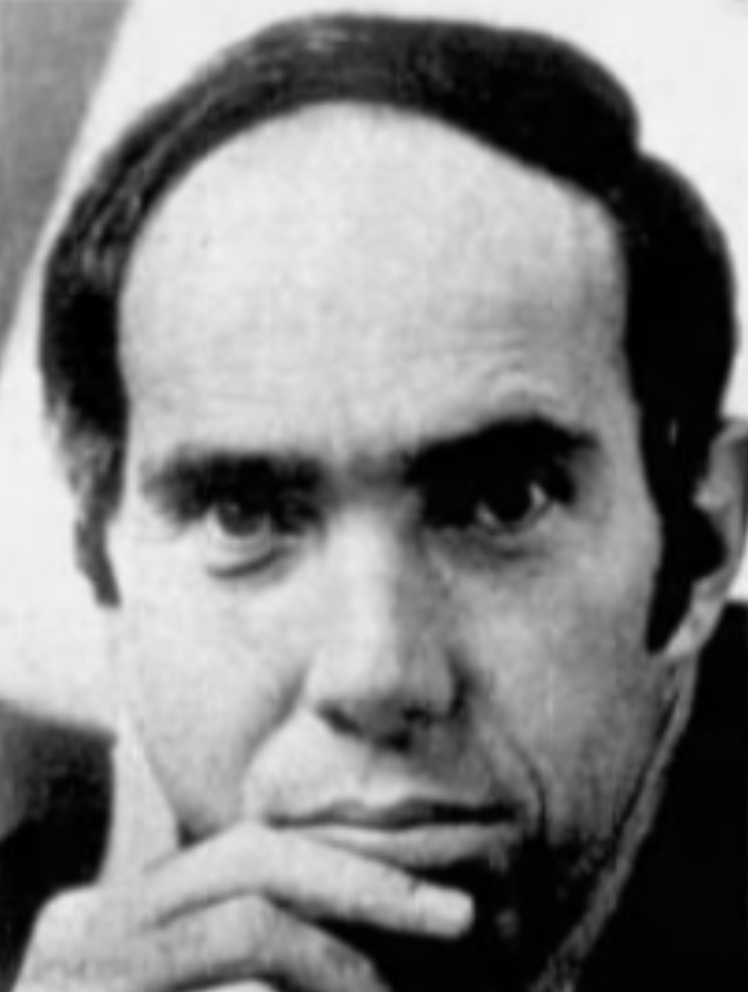
Nominee	Robert Stafford	Randolph Major
Party	Republican	Democratic
Popular vote	45,888	23,842
Percentage	64.4%	33.4%
- County results Stafford: 50–60% 60–70% 70–80%
U.S. senator before election
Robert Stafford
Republican
Elected U.S. Senator
Robert Stafford
Republican

The special election was held on January 7, 1972. The incumbent Republican Senator Robert Stafford, appointed in September 1971 to fill the vacancy created by the death of Winston L. Prouty, successfully ran for re-election to the remainder of Prouty's term. Stafford defeated Democratic candidate Randolph T. Major. Bernie Sanders, the Liberty Union candidate, was later elected to this seat in 2006, serving as an independent.

1972 U.S. Senate special election in Vermont
Party	Candidate	Votes	%
Republican	Robert Stafford (incumbent)	45,888	64.36
Democratic	Randolph T. Major	23,842	33.44
Liberty Union	Bernie Sanders	1,571	2.20
Majority		22,046	
Turnout		71,301	30.92
Republican hold			

== Virginia ==
1972 United States Senate election in Virginia
- November 7, 1972
- Turnout: 44.7%
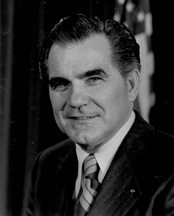

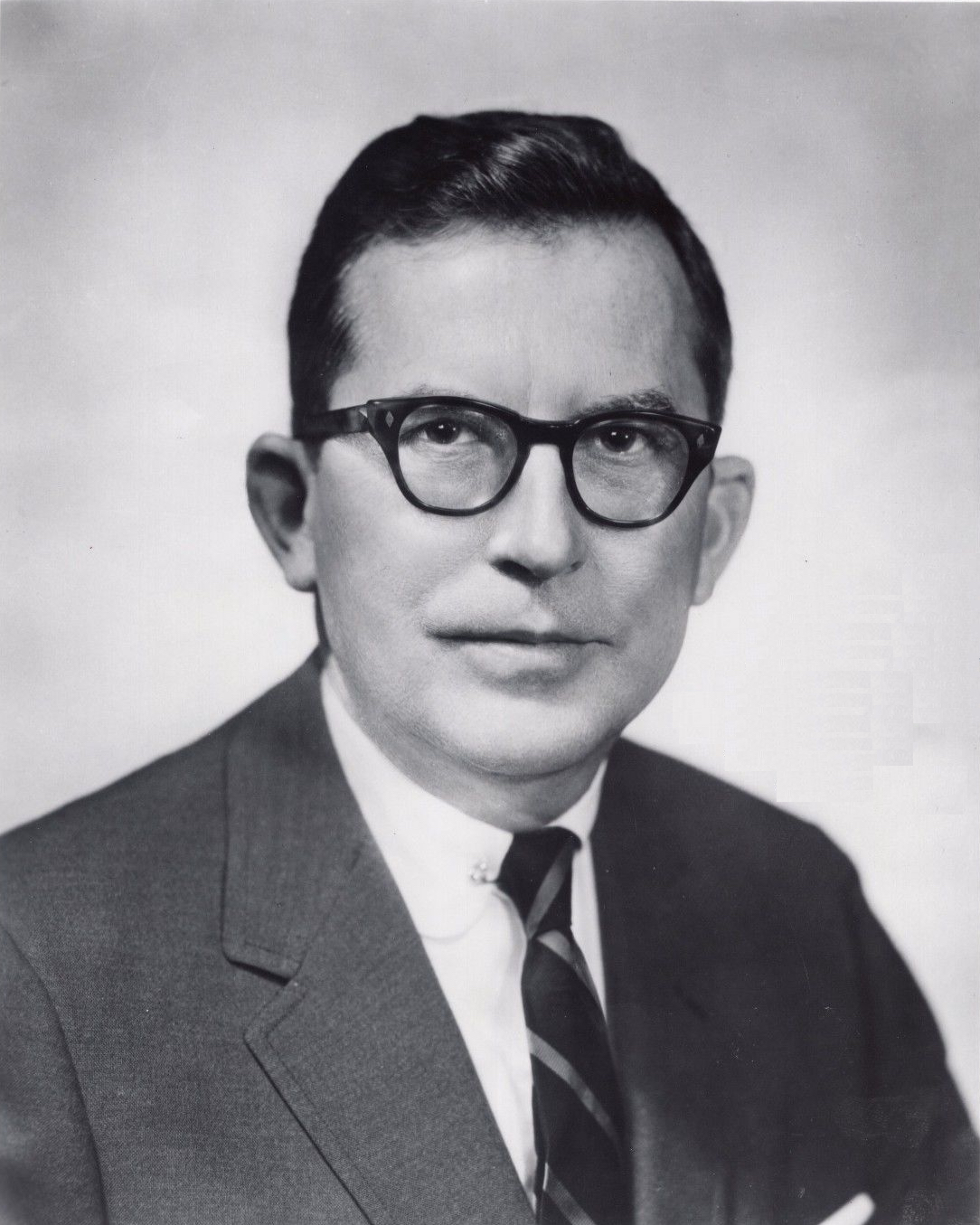
Nominee	William L. Scott	William Spong, Jr.
Party	Republican	Democratic
Popular vote	718,337	643,963
Percentage	51.5%	46.1%
- County and independent city results Scott: 50–60% 60–70% 70–80% Spong: 40–50% 50–60% 60–70% 70–80%
U.S. senator before election
William B. Spong, Jr.
Democratic
Elected U.S. Senator
William Lloyd Scott
Republican

The incumbent Democratic Senator William B. Spong Jr. was defeated by Republican William L. Scott, making Scott the first Republican senator from the state since John F. Lewis in 1870.

1972 U.S. Senate election in Virginia
Party	Candidate	Votes	%
Republican	William L. Scott	718,337	51.45
Democratic	William B. Spong Jr. (incumbent)	643,963	46.12
Independent	Horace E. Henderson	33,912	2.43
None	Scattering	56	0.00
Majority		74,374	5.33
Turnout		1,396,268	
Republican gain from Democratic			

== West Virginia ==
1972 United States Senate election in West Virginia
- November 7, 1972
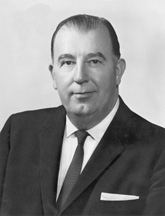

Nominee	Jennings Randolph	Louise Leonard
Party	Democratic	Republican
Popular vote	486,310	245,531
Percentage	66.5%	33.5%
- County results Randolph: 50–60% 60–70% 70–80% Leonard: 50–60% 60–70%
U.S. senator before election
Jennings Randolph
Democratic
Elected U.S. Senator
Jennings Randolph
Democratic

The incumbent Democratic Senator Jennings Randolph was re-elected.

1972 U.S. Senate election in West Virginia
Party	Candidate	Votes	%
Democratic	Jennings Randolph (incumbent)	486,310	66.45
Republican	Louise Leonard	245,531	33.55
Majority		240,779	32.90
Turnout		731,841	
Democratic hold			

== Wyoming ==
1972 United States Senate election in Wyoming
- November 7, 1972
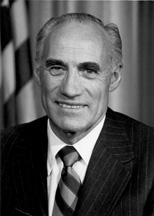

Nominee	Clifford Hansen	Mike Vinich
Party	Republican	Democratic
Popular vote	101,314	40,753
Percentage	71.31%	28.69%
- County results Hansen: 60–70% 70–80% 80–90%
U.S. senator before election
Clifford Hansen
Republican
Elected U.S. Senator
Clifford Hansen
Republican

Incumbent Republican Senator Clifford Hansen was re-elected.

1972 U.S. Senate election in Wyoming
Party	Candidate	Votes	%
Republican	Clifford Hansen (incumbent)	101,314	71.31
Democratic	Mike Vinch	40,753	28.69
Majority		60,561	42.62
Turnout		142,067	
Republican hold			

== See also ==
- 1972 United States elections
  - 1972 United States gubernatorial elections
  - 1972 United States presidential election
  - 1972 United States House of Representatives elections
- 92nd United States Congress
- 93rd United States Congress
