= 1972 United States Senate election in Alaska =

- November 7, 1972
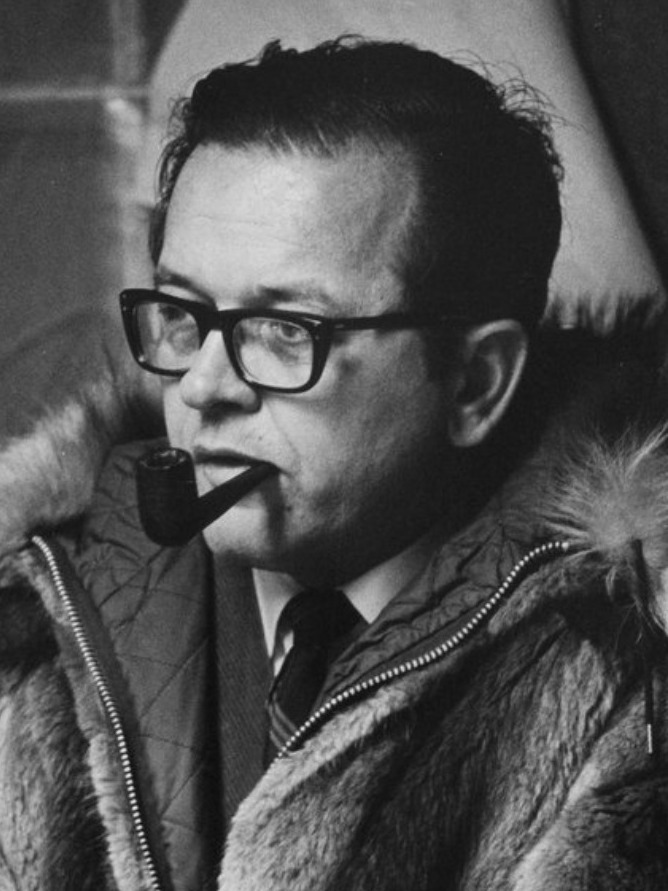

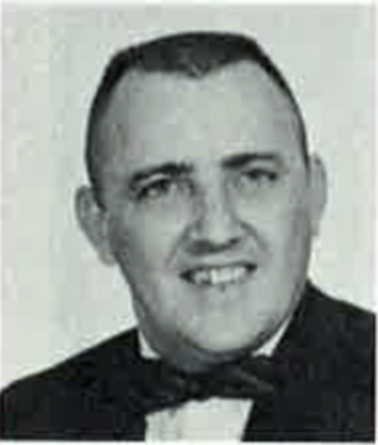
Nominee	Ted Stevens	Gene Guess
Party	Republican	Democratic
Popular vote	74,216	21,791
Percentage	77.30%	22.70%
- Stevens: 60–70% 70–80% 80–90%
U.S. senator before election
Ted Stevens
Republican
Elected U.S. Senator
Ted Stevens
Republican

The 1972 United States Senate election in Alaska was held on November 7, 1972. Republican U.S. Senator Ted Stevens, who was first appointed and elected to complete the unexpired term of Bob Bartlett was re-elected to his second term (a full term) in office, over Democrat Gene Guess.

== General election ==
=== Results ===
General election results
Party	Candidate	Votes	%	±%
Republican	Ted Stevens (inc.)	74,216	77.30%	▲17.69
Democratic	Gene Guess	21,791	22.70%	▼17.69
Total votes		96,007	100.00%	

== See also ==
- 1972 United States Senate elections
