= Gretchen Guess =

American businesswoman and politician (born 1969)

Personal details
- Born: September 5, 1969 Anchorage, Alaska, U.S.
- Party: Democratic
- Education: Carleton College (BA); University of Rochester (MPP)

Gretchen Guess (born September 5, 1969) is an American businesswoman and politician.

Born in Anchorage, Alaska, Guess received her bachelor's degree in economics from Carleton College and her master's degree in public policy analysis from University of Rochester. Guess was a consultant and business analyst. From 2001 to 2003, Guess served in the Alaska House of Representatives and was a Democrat. She then served in the Alaska State Senate from 2003 to 2007. From 2011 to 2013, Guess served on the Anchorage School Board and was president of the school board. In 2013, Guess resigned from the school to take a job at St. Vincent's HealthCare in Jacksonville, Florida. Her father Gene Guess also served in the Alaska Legislature.
