= Gene Guess =

American politician (1932–1975)

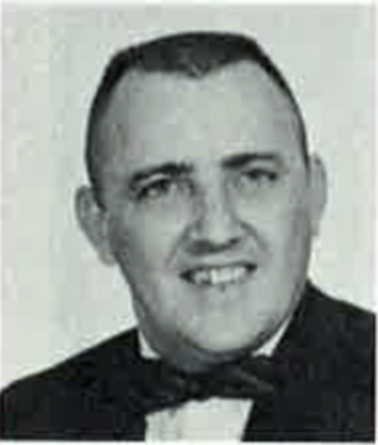

Personal details
- Born: Walter Eugene Guess; December 30, 1932 Tutwiler, Mississippi, U.S.
- Died: March 13, 1975 (aged 42) Juneau, Alaska, U.S.
- Party: Democratic
- Children: Gretchen Guess
- Education: College of William and Mary (BA); University of Virginia, Charlottesville (LLB)

Walter Eugene Guess (December 30, 1932 – March 13, 1975) was an American lawyer and politician.

Born in Tutwiler, Mississippi, Guess graduated from George Washington High School in Alexandria, Virginia. In 1955, Guess graduated from the College of William & Mary. He served in the United States Army as an artillery officer at Fort Sill, Oklahoma. In 1959, Guess received his law degree from University of Virginia School of Law. He worked as an attorney for the United States Department of the Interior and settled in Anchorage, Alaska. He then practiced law in Anchorage. From 1965 to 1973, Guess served in the Alaska House of Representatives and was a Democrat. He served as speaker of the house in 1971. In 1972 and 1974, Guess campaigned for the United States Senate and lost the elections. Guess died of an aneurysm at the Baranof Hotel in Juneau, Alaska while on a business trip. His daughter Gretchen Guess also served in the Alaska Legislature.

== Notes ==
Political offices
Preceded by Jay Kerttula	Speaker of the Alaska House of Representatives; 1971–1973	Succeeded by Tom Fink
Party political offices
Preceded by Wendell P. Kay	Democratic nominee for U.S. Senator from Alaska (Class 2); 1972	Succeeded by Don Hobbs
