= National Register of Historic Places listings in Humphreys County, Tennessee =

Location of Humphreys County in Tennessee

This is a list of the National Register of Historic Places listings in Humphreys County, Tennessee.

This is intended to be a complete list of the properties and districts on the National Register of Historic Places in Humphreys County, Tennessee, United States. Latitude and longitude coordinates are provided for many National Register properties and districts; these locations may be seen together in a map.

There are 10 properties and districts listed on the National Register in the county.

Contents: Counties in Tennessee
Anderson – Bedford – Benton – Bledsoe – Blount – Bradley – Campbell – Cannon – Carroll – Carter – Cheatham – Chester – Claiborne – Clay – Cocke – Coffee – Crockett – Cumberland – Davidson – Decatur – DeKalb – Dickson – Dyer – Fayette – Fentress – Franklin – Gibson – Giles – Grainger – Greene – Grundy – Hamblen – Hamilton – Hancock – Hardeman – Hardin – Hawkins – Haywood – Henderson – Henry – Hickman – Houston – Humphreys – Jackson – Jefferson – Johnson – Knox – Lake – Lauderdale – Lawrence – Lewis – Lincoln – Loudon – Macon – Madison – Marion – Marshall – Maury – McMinn – McNairy – Meigs – Monroe – Montgomery – Moore – Morgan – Obion – Overton – Perry – Pickett – Polk – Putnam – Rhea – Roane – Robertson – Rutherford – Scott – Sequatchie – Sevier – Shelby – Smith – Stewart – Sullivan – Sumner – Tipton – Trousdale – Unicoi – Union – Van Buren – Warren – Washington – Wayne – Weakley – White – Williamson – Wilson

This National Park Service list is complete through NPS recent listings posted August 29, 2025.

== Current listings ==
	Name on the Register	Image	Date listed	Location	City or town	Description
1	Enochs Mill		September 9, 1999 (#99001138)	3072 Little Blue Creek Rd. 36°04′42″N 87°41′12″W	McEwen	
2	Fairchance Furnace (40HS168)		July 28, 1988 (#88001143)	Address Restricted	Halls Creek	
3	Fort Hill and Archibald D. Butterfield House	Fort Hill and Archibald D. Butterfield House	February 9, 2001 (#01000101)	201 Fort Hill Dr. 36°04′54″N 87°47′32″W	Waverly	
4	Greyhound Half-Way House	Greyhound Half-Way House	December 17, 1999 (#99001588)	124 E. Main St. 36°04′58″N 87°47′34″W	Waverly	
5	Hurricane Mills Rural Historic District	Hurricane Mills Rural Historic District	December 13, 1999 (#99001449)	44 Hurricane Mills Rd. 35°57′53″N 87°47′08″W	Hurricane Mills	
6	Johnsonville Historic District		March 12, 2001 (#01000257)	Old Johnsonville Rd. 36°03′31″N 87°58′33″W	Denver	
7	Link Farm Site		April 11, 1973 (#73001791)	Address Restricted	Hurricane Mills	
8	Hugh M. McAdoo House	Hugh M. McAdoo House	October 29, 1991 (#91001595)	113 N. Church St. 36°05′03″N 87°47′36″W	Waverly	
9	James N. Nolan House	James N. Nolan House	March 13, 1986 (#86000395)	State Route 13N; 36°05′17″N 87°47′37″W	Waverly	
10	Sycamore Landing		January 4, 1980 (#80003837)	Sycamore Landing Rd. 35°56′09″N 87°54′54″W	Sycamore Landing	

== See also ==
- List of National Historic Landmarks in Tennessee
- National Register of Historic Places listings in Tennessee
