= 2021 Tennessee floods =

Natural disaster

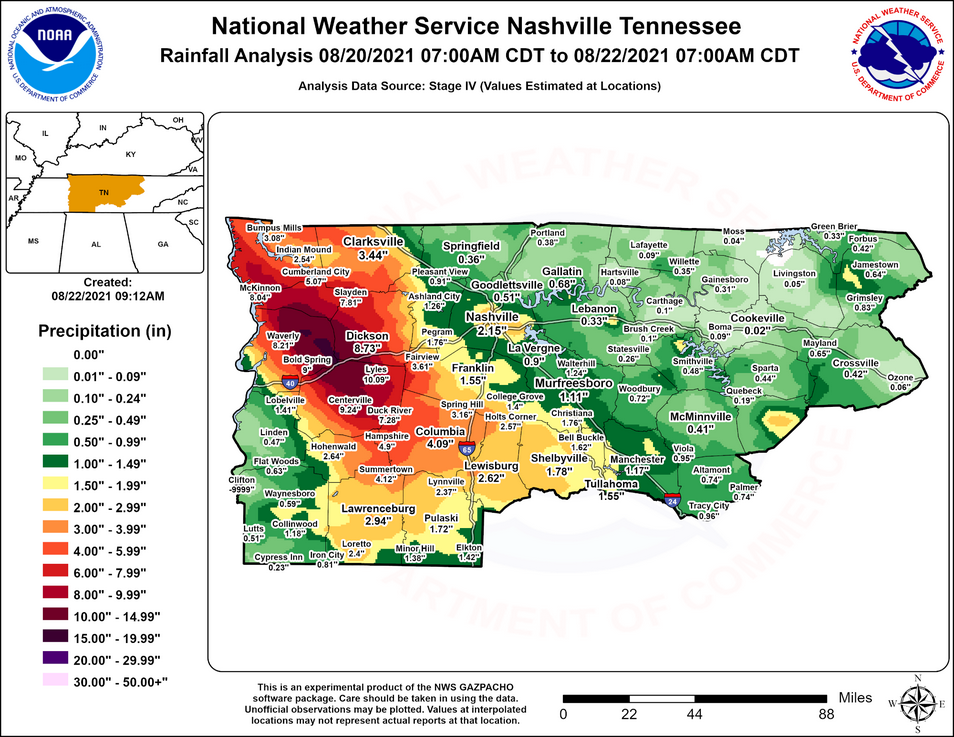
- Radar estimated 24-hour rainfall over western Middle Tennessee ending at 9:00 a.m. CDT August 21, 2021
- Date: August 21, 2021
- Location: Western Middle Tennessee, Western Kentucky (Jackson Purchase)
- Deaths: 20 fatalities
- Property damage: $101,110,000 (2021 USD)

Between midnight and 10:00 am CDT on Saturday, August 21, 2021, very heavy rainfall resulted in widespread flash flooding across western Middle Tennessee, including the town of Waverly. During the event, much of a five-county area received up to a quarter of normal annual rainfall in under 12 hours, as much as 10 to 15 inches (250 to 380 mm). In a situation described as catastrophic, Waverly was severely damaged by floodwater, with hundreds of homes and dozens of businesses destroyed and swept away. Numerous people became trapped, leading to widespread water rescues. The event resulted in 19 fatalities in Waverly, with another in nearby Hurricane Mills, and is regarded as one of the worst natural disasters in Tennessee history. The event broke the 24-hour rainfall record in Tennessee, with over 20 inches (510 mm) of rain falling in McEwen. Flooding also occurred in parts of western Kentucky, but to a much lesser extent.

== Meteorological synopsis ==
A stalled frontal boundary west of Nashville led to training thunderstorms during the early hours of August 21, producing very heavy rainfall rates across the counties of Stewart, Houston, Dickson, Humphreys, and Hickman. Precipitable water values reached as high as 2.37 inches (60 mm) at 7 a.m. CDT, breaking the previous record of 2.21 inches (56 mm) for that specific date and time. Rain started shortly after midnight and intensified throughout the morning, quickly filling area creeks and streams. By daybreak, numerous homes and businesses had been flooded in Humphreys County, leading to evacuations and water rescues. A rain gauge operated by the Tennessee Valley Authority in McEwen recorded 17.02 inches (432 mm) of rain, setting a provisional daily rainfall record in Tennessee. This broke the previous record of 13.6 inches (350 mm) recorded in Milan in 1982. The previous highest daily record rainfall in Middle Tennessee was 9.45 inches (240 mm) in Franklin in May 2010, and the two-day total for Nashville in 2010 was 13.57 inches (345 mm). Months later, in December, another rain gauge in McEwen, located at the McEwen Wastewater Treatment Plant, was officially verified as the state record, having recorded 20.73 inches (527 mm) of rain, breaking the previous record by slightly over 7 inches (180 mm).

Eastern Humphreys County, around the McEwen area, received substantially more rainfall than Waverly. However, the headwaters of Trace Creek originate in eastern parts of the county, with all the water draining westward through Waverly. Areas of Houston, central Humphreys, and northern Hickman counties still received upwards of 8 to 10 inches (200 to 250 mm) of rain during the event. The historic rainfall totals in McEwen and resulting flooding event in Waverly were compounded by a 300-foot (91 m) drop in elevation along Trace Creek as it flows westward into Waverly, along with a CSX Bruceton Subdivision railroad bridge adjacent to U.S. Route 70–roughly one mile (1.6 km) east of town–that became blocked by debris, resulting in a temporary dam and lake forming. The land under the railroad eventually gave way, sending a large tsunami-like wave into Waverly, with much of the town becoming inundated within the following five to twenty minutes.

== Damage ==
A level three state of emergency was declared by the Tennessee Emergency Management Agency (TEMA) for Dickson, Hickman, Houston, and Humphreys counties in response to the flooding event. As many as 4,200 customers were left without power by that afternoon, 3,500 of which were in Humphreys County. According to TEMA, over 700 homes were flooded during the event, mostly in Waverly.

=== Humphreys County/Waverly ===
Areas near the town of McEwen received the most rainfall from the event, as much as 15 to 20 inches (380 to 510 mm) in some places. Much of the floodwater exited the area westward along Trace Creek, causing large swells which inundated much of Waverly, just to the west. Waverly had received comparatively less rainfall than McEwen but was flooded by runoff from upstream. In Waverly, many homes and businesses became flooded after 6 a.m. CDT, prompting evacuations and water rescues. Waverly Elementary School and Waverly Junior High School were both inundated with several feet of water, and the Humphreys County 911 center was rendered inoperable by the flooding. Officials in Waverly commented that had the flood occurred during a weekday, the schools would have been full of students and would have been impossible to evacuate in time. Roads into Waverly became impassable, with crews trying to perform rescue operations unable to reach some areas. Cell phone service in the area was disrupted as well, complicating initial response and recovery efforts. The county water system was reported down by the Humphreys County Sheriff, and a boil water advisory was issued by the Waverly Department of Public Safety. Just west of town, Waverly Central High School was impacted, with the football field, stadium, weight room, and locker room all being destroyed by the flood.

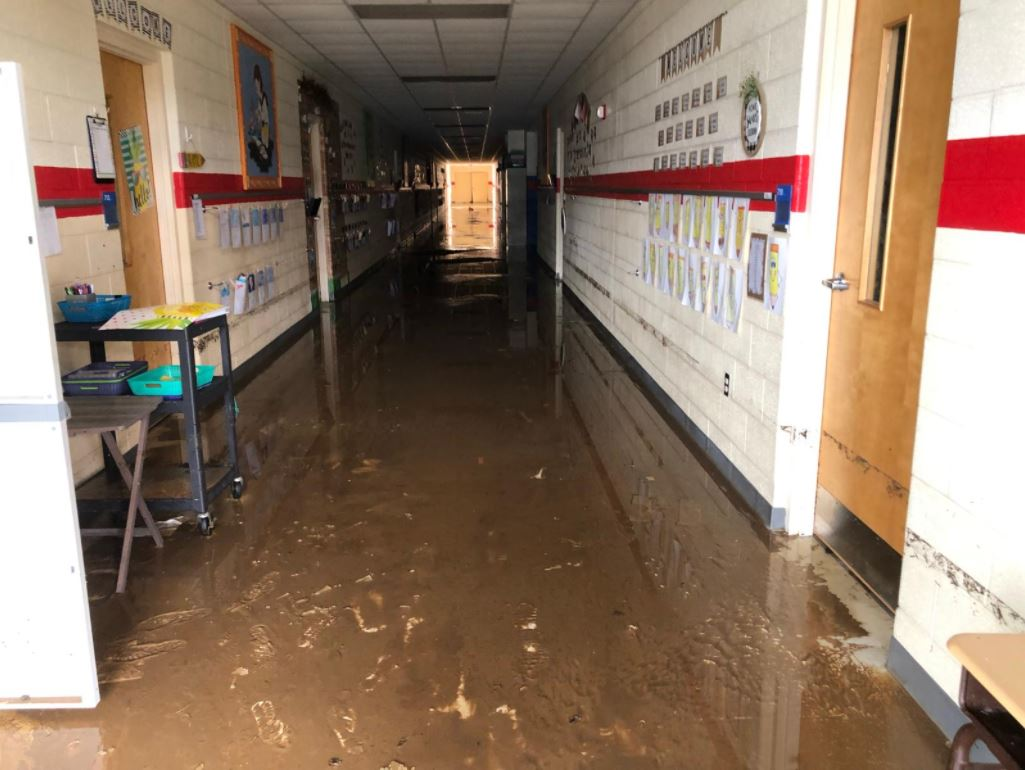
Waverly Elementary School was inundated with over 3 feet (0.91 m) of water.

Roads in Waverly such as U.S. 70, Tennessee State Route 13, and Main Street were rendered impassable into Saturday evening due to residual flooding and debris. Flooding, debris, and traffic left U.S. 70 mostly closed from west of Waverly eastward into Dickson County, in addition to CSX railroad traffic. Numerous washed out and flooded roads prevented search and rescue and various news crews from arriving in Waverly until hours later.

South of Waverly, Hurricane Creek greatly flooded the community of Hurricane Mills and Loretta Lynn's Ranch. The ranch lost buildings and structures, in addition to a roadway being washed away and many fences being taken down. After trying to retrieve a tractor from rising floodwaters, a ranch foreman was swept away and found deceased a short time later. East of the ranch, after flooding from Hurricane Creek and Tumbling Creek, Tennessee State Route 230 remained closed for several days as officials cleared debris and assessed damage to the roadway.

In Humphreys County, at least 509 homes were impacted by flooding, 271 of which were completely destroyed. Eight public facilities and 44 commercial properties sustained damage, many of which were in downtown Waverly. The Humphreys County sheriff commented: "We have well over 125 homes that are just gone – off the foundation, twisted, turned, or just gone."

Ten bridges in the county remained closed well after the event as a result of flood damage, including the westbound U.S. 70 bridge over Trace Creek, the TN 230 bridges over Hurricane Creek, and seven county-owned bridges across Trace Creek, Blue Creek, Hurricane Creek, Little Hurricane Creek, and Bateman Branch.

=== Hickman County ===
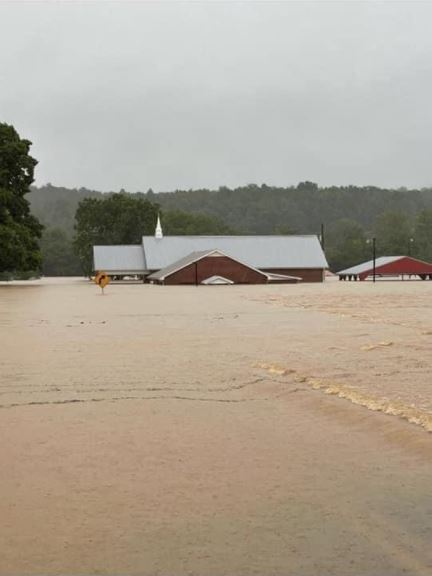
Pinewood Church of Christ along the Piney River north of Nunnelly

Numerous roads were impassable by high water or washed completely away during the flooding, especially around the Pinewood community, where a church was inundated and an RV park was swept away along the Piney River north of Nunnelly. Tennessee State Route 48 was flooded and washed out by Garner Creek and the Piney River, and Interstate 40 was flooded in several sections in northwestern Hickman County. The Williamson County Sheriff's Office aviation unit performed six water rescues in Hickman County. The Ranch, a rehabilitation center along the Piney River in Pinewood, was heavily damaged in the flooding, along with Pinewood Camp and Canoe. According to a local business owner, damage from this event was much worse than May 2010. North of Pinewood, the State Route 48 bridge over Garner Creek was repaired by crews after a couple days. However, the State Route 230 bridge over the Piney River remained closed, requiring extensive repair.

=== Dickson County ===
Numerous homes and businesses in the town of Dickson was flooded, along with many rural areas of southwest Dickson County. Areas along the Piney River were flooded as the river made its way south into Hickman County. State Route 48 was made impassable by floodwaters in numerous places. Crews in Dickson County responded to 15 rescue calls using four water rescue teams. A shelter was opened at the Dickson County YMCA for those displaced by flooding.

=== Kentucky ===
The northern extent of the main area excessive rainfall and flooding was over the Jackson Purchase in Kentucky, specifically Calloway County. In the New Concord area, Highway 121 was closed by high floodwaters, while a bridge along Highway 280 had pavement washed away. Up to 7 inches (180 mm) of rain fell in parts of Calloway County, although Murray only received 3.45 inches (88 mm). In Marshall County, Highway 1462 was closed at the Clarks River bridge, while flooding in McCracken County was observed in the Reidland area following roughly 3.5 inches (89 mm) of rain.

=== Casualties ===
By that evening, 10 deaths were confirmed in Humphreys County by the local sheriff, along with several people reported missing. By the morning of August 22, the death toll had risen to 17, and over 40 people had been reported missing. Later, the count rose to 22 fatalities as missing people were located. By the morning of August 23, fewer than 20 people were still considered missing, and by August 24, the count of missing was down to seven. On August 25, it was reported that all missing people had been located, and the death toll was revised down to 20 as authorities completed more accurate counts.

== Relief efforts and aftermath ==
Initial relief efforts included TEMA opening shelters in Waverly, Dickson, and Centerville to house displaced families. Search and rescue crews arrived from Nashville and many surrounding counties in the state to aid operations in Waverly. On August 23, President Joe Biden approved a federal disaster declaration for Humphreys County, freeing federal funds to assist in recovery efforts. Hickman, Houston, and Dickson counties were added to the disaster declaration on August 25. Many groups and organizations came to the aid of residents, such as the Red Cross, which assisted in TEMA and local partners in setting up shelters and bringing in supplies. The Mount Juliet High School football team donated gear to Waverly Central High School to replace items lost in the flooding, and the Tennessee Titans organization donated $50,000 to flood relief, in addition to offering a new washer and dryer and use of Nissan Stadium to the Waverly football team for homes games during the season.

Calls from parents and residents of Humphreys County led school officials to consider relocating Waverly Elementary and Junior High schools away from Trace Creek to prevent damage from future flooding.

The Appalachia Service Project (ASP) worked with volunteers to rebuild five homes for families that were affected by the flooding by August 2022, with the goal to eventually rebuild 25 homes.

Property damage from the event was estimated at $101,110,000 (2021 USD).

== See also ==
- 2010 Tennessee floods
- July 2022 United States floods
- Climate change in Tennessee
