= 2000 United States presidential election in Tennessee =

- November 7, 2000
- Turnout: 63.03% (▲0.26 pp)

Nominee	George W. Bush	Al Gore
Party	Republican	Democratic
Home state	Texas	Tennessee
Running mate	Dick Cheney	Joe Lieberman
Electoral vote	11	0
Popular vote	1,061,949	981,720
Percentage	51.15%	47.28%

Bush
40–50%
50–60%
60–70%
70–80%
80–90%
Gore
40–50%
50–60%
60–70%
70–80%
80–90%
90–100%
Tie/No data
President before election
Bill Clinton
Democratic
Elected President
George W. Bush
Republican

The 2000 United States presidential election in Tennessee was held on November 7, 2000, and was part of the 2000 United States presidential election. Voters chose 11 representatives, or electors, to the Electoral College, who voted for president and vice president.

Tennessee was won by Texas Governor George W. Bush by a 3.87% margin of victory, despite having voted for President Bill Clinton in 1992 and 1996 and being the home state of Vice President Al Gore. Had Gore carried his home state, he would have won the presidency. Gore's defeat was considered an upset, as he had previously won every county in Tennessee in 1990 in his Senate bid and was popular in the state prior to his election as vice president.

This was the last of three consecutive elections in which Tennessee was decided by single-digit margins, and as of 2024, this is the last election in which Tennessee was decided by less than 13%. Since 2000, Tennessee has rapidly moved away from swing state status and become a Republican stronghold. Gore was the first major party nominee to lose his home state since George McGovern lost South Dakota in 1972. Additionally, this was the first election where a presidential nominee won the state with more than a million votes.

As of the 2024 presidential election, this is the last election in which Campbell County, Lewis County, Robertson County, Gibson County, Dickson County, Bedford County, Franklin County, Warren County, Henry County, Marshall County, Giles County, Marion County, White County, Hickman County, DeKalb County, Crockett County, Cannon County, and Decatur County voted for the Democratic nominee. Gore's victories in Marion and Campbell remain the last time that a Democrat has carried any county in staunchly Republican East Tennessee, this was also the last time a Democrat crossed 40% in East Tennessee. The election served as the last in which Tennessee was regarded as a swing state in some outlets.

== Primary elections ==
=== Democratic primary ===
2000 Tennessee Democratic presidential primary
- March 14, 2000

81 delegates to the Democratic National Convention (68 pledged, 13 unpledged) The number of pledged delegates received is determined by the popular vote

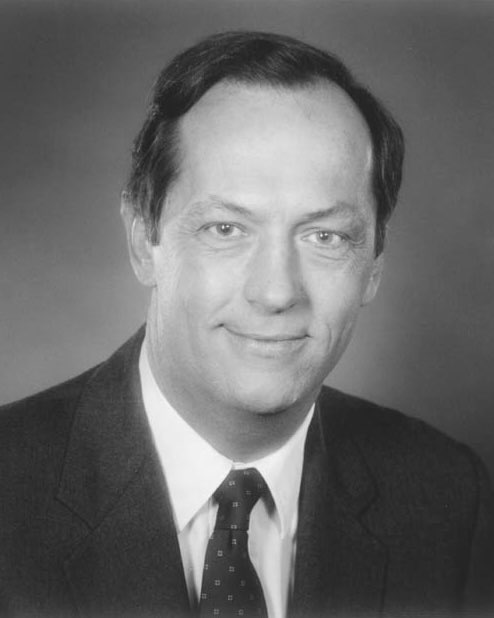
Candidate	Al Gore	Bill Bradley (withdrawn)
Home state	Tennessee	New Jersey
Delegate count	68	0
Popular vote	198,264	11,323
Percentage	92.13%	5.26%
- Results by county Gore: 70–80% 80–90% 90–100%

The 2000 Tennessee Democratic presidential primary was held on March 14, 2000, as one of six contests scheduled the following week after Super Tuesday. The Tennessee primary was an open primary, with the state awarding 81 delegates towards the 2000 Democratic National Convention, of which 68 were pledged delegates allocated on the basis of the results of the primary.

Vice president Al Gore easily decided the primary in his home state, winning 92.1% of the vote and all 68 delegates. Senator Bill Bradley took only 5.3% of the vote and earned 0 delegates, while Lyndon LaRouche Jr. only got 0.5% of the vote.

2000 Tennessee Democratic presidential primary
Candidate	Votes	%	Delegates
Al Gore	198,264	92.13	68
Bill Bradley (withdrawn)	11,323	5.26	
Uncommitted	4,407	2.05	13
Lyndon LaRouche Jr.	1,031	0.48	
Write-in votes	178	0.08	
Total	215,203	100%	81

=== Republican primary ===
2000 Tennessee Republican presidential primary
- March 14, 2000

37 pledged delegates to the; 2000 Republican National Convention

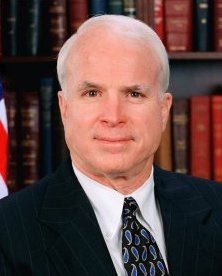

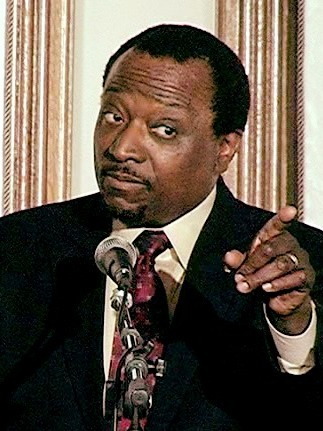
Candidate	George W. Bush	John McCain
Home state	Texas	Arizona
Delegate count	37	0
Popular vote	193,166	36,436
Percentage	77.02%	14.53%
Candidate	Alan Keyes
Home state	Maryland
Delegate count	0
Popular vote	16,916
Percentage	6.75%
- Results by county Bush: 60–65% 65–70% 70–75% 75–80% 80–85% 85–90%

The 2000 Tennessee Republican presidential primary was held on March 14, 2000, as one of 6 contests scheduled the following week after Super Tuesday. The Tennessee primary was an open primary, with the state awarding 37 delegates towards the 2000 Republican National Convention.

George W. Bush won the primary with 77.0% of the vote and all 37 of the state's delegates. John McCain came second with 14.5% of the vote. Alan Keyes came third with 6.8% of the vote.

2000 Tennessee Republican presidential primary
Candidate	Votes	Percentage	Delegates
George W. Bush	193,166	77.02%	37
John McCain	36,436	14.53%	0
Alan Keyes	16,916	6.75%	0
Gary Bauer	1,305	0.52%	0
Steve Forbes	1,018	0.41%	0
Orrin Hatch	252	0.10%	0
Write-ins	75	0.03%	0
Uncommitted	1,623	0.65%	0
Total	250,791	100.00%	37

== General election ==
=== Polling ===
Poll source	Date(s)	Sample size	Margin of error	George W. Bush (R)	Al Gore (D)	Ralph Nader (G)	Other / undecided (Note: Calculated by taking the difference of 100% and all other listed candidates combined. For polls that do not report a figure for Nader, this includes his support.)
Zogby Analytics	November 5, 2000	490	—	52%	45%	2%	1%
Harris Insights & Analytics	November 3, 2000	5,187	—	49%	47%	2%	2%
Mason-Dixon Polling & Strategy	November 3, 2000	625	—	49%	45%	—	6%
Zogby Analytics	November 2, 2000	500	—	46%	46%	4%	4%
American Research Group	October 31, 2000	600	—	43%	49%	2%	6%
Ethridge & Associates LLC	October 31, 2000	550	—	47%	44%	—	9%
Zogby Analytics	October 30, 2000	500	—	48%	45%	2%	5%
Multi-Quest International	October 29, 2000	403 (RV)	—	43%	45%	—	12%
Rasmussen Reports	October 28, 2000	722	—	45%	44%	—	11%
Zogby Analytics	October 27, 2000	500	—	51%	44%	2%	3%
Rasmussen Reports	October 21, 2000	839	—	47%	43%	—	10%

=== Results ===
2000 United States presidential election in Tennessee
Party	Candidate	Running mate	Popular vote		Electoral vote		Swing
Party	Candidate	Running mate	Count	%	Count	%	Swing
Republican	George W. Bush of Texas	Dick Cheney of Wyoming	1,061,949	51.15%	11	100.00%	▲5.56%
Democratic	Al Gore of Tennessee	Joe Lieberman of Connecticut	981,720	47.28%	0	0.00%	▼0.72%
Green	Ralph Nader of Connecticut	Winona LaDuke of Minnesota	19,781	0.95%	0	0.00%	▲N/A
Reform	Pat Buchanan of Virginia	Ezola B. Foster of California	3,169	0.21%	0	0.00%	▼5.38%
Libertarian	Harry Browne of Tennessee	Art Olivier of California	4,284	0.30%	0	0.00%	▼0.00%
Constitution	Howard Phillips of Virginia	Darrell Castle of Tennessee	23	0.00%	0	0.00%	Steady
Natural Law	John Hagelin of Iowa	Nat Goldhaber of California	367	0.06%	0	0.00%	▲0.06%
Write-in	Various of Various	Various of Various	1	0.00%	0	0.00%	Steady
Total			2,071,984	100.00%	11	100.00%	

==== By county ====
County	George W. Bush Republican		Al Gore Democratic		Various candidates Other parties		Margin		Total
County	#	%	#	%	#	%	#	%	Total
Anderson	14,688	51.04%	13,556	47.10%	535	1.86%	1,132	3.94%	28,779
Bedford	5,911	48.42%	6,136	50.27%	160	1.31%	-225	-1.85%	12,207
Benton	2,484	39.36%	3,700	58.63%	127	2.01%	-1,216	-19.27%	6,311
Bledsoe	2,380	56.72%	1,756	41.85%	60	1.43%	624	14.87%	4,196
Blount	25,273	62.15%	14,688	36.12%	701	1.72%	10,585	26.03%	40,662
Bradley	20,167	68.50%	8,768	29.78%	508	1.73%	11,399	38.72%	29,443
Campbell	5,784	46.57%	6,492	52.27%	145	1.17%	-708	-5.70%	12,421
Cannon	1,924	40.96%	2,697	57.42%	76	1.62%	-773	-16.46%	4,697
Carroll	5,465	50.48%	5,239	48.39%	123	1.14%	226	2.09%	10,827
Carter	12,111	63.40%	6,724	35.20%	267	1.40%	5,387	28.20%	19,102
Cheatham	6,356	50.38%	6,062	48.05%	198	1.57%	294	2.33%	12,616
Chester	3,487	60.88%	2,192	38.27%	49	0.86%	1,295	22.61%	5,728
Claiborne	5,023	55.81%	3,841	42.68%	136	1.51%	1,182	13.13%	9,000
Clay	1,468	42.65%	1,931	56.10%	43	1.25%	-463	-13.45%	3,442
Cocke	6,185	60.41%	3,872	37.82%	182	1.78%	2,313	22.59%	10,239
Coffee	8,788	49.40%	8,741	49.14%	259	1.46%	47	0.26%	17,788
Crockett	2,676	49.19%	2,705	49.72%	59	1.08%	-29	-0.53%	5,440
Cumberland	10,994	57.81%	7,644	40.20%	379	1.99%	3,350	17.61%	19,017
Davidson	84,117	40.33%	120,508	57.77%	3,963	1.90%	-36,391	-17.44%	208,588
Decatur	2,046	46.82%	2,278	52.13%	46	1.05%	-232	-5.31%	4,370
DeKalb	2,411	38.48%	3,765	60.10%	89	1.42%	-1,354	-21.62%	6,265
Dickson	7,016	45.10%	8,332	53.56%	208	1.34%	-1,316	-8.46%	15,556
Dyer	6,282	53.05%	5,425	45.82%	134	1.13%	857	7.23%	11,841
Fayette	6,402	55.53%	5,037	43.69%	90	0.78%	1,365	11.84%	11,529
Fentress	3,417	56.68%	2,529	41.95%	83	1.38%	888	14.73%	6,029
Franklin	6,560	44.65%	7,828	53.28%	303	2.06%	-1,268	-8.63%	14,691
Gibson	8,286	48.35%	8,663	50.55%	188	1.10%	-377	-2.20%	17,137
Giles	4,377	43.48%	5,527	54.91%	162	1.61%	-1,150	-11.43%	10,066
Grainger	3,746	60.48%	2,361	38.12%	87	1.40%	1,385	22.36%	6,194
Greene	12,540	60.24%	7,909	37.99%	367	1.76%	4,631	22.25%	20,816
Grundy	1,553	33.79%	2,970	64.62%	73	1.59%	-1,417	-30.83%	4,596
Hamblen	11,824	60.02%	7,564	38.40%	311	1.58%	4,260	21.62%	19,699
Hamilton	66,605	55.33%	51,708	42.95%	2,066	1.72%	14,897	12.38%	120,379
Hancock	1,343	64.72%	690	33.25%	42	2.02%	653	31.47%	2,075
Hardeman	3,729	42.36%	4,953	56.26%	121	1.37%	-1,224	-13.90%	8,803
Hardin	4,951	56.38%	3,735	42.53%	96	1.09%	1,216	13.85%	8,782
Hawkins	10,071	58.90%	6,753	39.50%	274	1.60%	3,318	19.40%	17,098
Haywood	2,554	39.43%	3,887	60.00%	37	0.57%	-1,333	-20.57%	6,478
Henderson	5,153	61.35%	3,166	37.69%	80	0.95%	1,987	23.66%	8,399
Henry	5,944	48.29%	6,093	49.50%	272	2.21%	-149	-1.21%	12,309
Hickman	2,914	40.12%	4,239	58.36%	111	1.53%	-1,325	-18.24%	7,264
Houston	993	31.76%	2,081	66.55%	53	1.69%	-1,088	-34.79%	3,127
Humphreys	2,387	35.73%	4,205	62.94%	89	1.33%	-1,818	-27.21%	6,681
Jackson	1,384	29.11%	3,304	69.50%	66	1.39%	-1,920	-40.39%	4,754
Jefferson	8,657	61.45%	5,226	37.10%	204	1.45%	3,431	24.35%	14,087
Johnson	3,740	66.11%	1,813	32.05%	104	1.84%	1,927	34.06%	5,657
Knox	86,851	57.68%	60,969	40.49%	2,766	1.84%	25,882	17.19%	150,586
Lake	781	35.12%	1,419	63.80%	24	1.08%	-638	-28.68%	2,224
Lauderdale	3,329	43.70%	4,224	55.45%	65	0.85%	-895	-11.75%	7,618
Lawrence	7,613	52.61%	6,643	45.91%	214	1.48%	970	6.70%	14,470
Lewis	2,037	46.09%	2,281	51.61%	102	2.31%	-244	-5.52%	4,420
Lincoln	5,435	50.99%	5,060	47.47%	164	1.54%	375	3.52%	10,659
Loudon	10,266	62.57%	5,905	35.99%	235	1.43%	4,361	26.58%	16,406
Macon	3,366	51.86%	3,059	47.13%	66	1.02%	307	4.73%	6,491
Madison	17,862	52.64%	15,781	46.51%	287	0.85%	2,081	6.13%	33,930
Marion	4,651	45.38%	5,441	53.08%	158	1.54%	-790	-7.70%	10,250
Marshall	4,105	43.86%	5,107	54.57%	147	1.57%	-1,002	-10.71%	9,359
Maury	11,930	50.98%	11,127	47.55%	343	1.47%	803	3.43%	23,400
McMinn	10,155	61.17%	6,142	37.00%	303	1.83%	4,013	24.17%	16,600
McNairy	4,897	54.48%	4,003	44.53%	89	0.99%	894	9.95%	8,989
Meigs	1,797	53.01%	1,555	45.87%	38	1.12%	242	7.14%	3,390
Monroe	7,514	57.79%	5,327	40.97%	162	1.25%	2,187	16.82%	13,003
Montgomery	19,644	50.31%	18,818	48.20%	582	1.49%	826	2.11%	39,044
Moore	1,145	49.76%	1,107	48.11%	49	2.13%	38	1.65%	2,301
Morgan	3,144	51.02%	2,921	47.40%	97	1.57%	223	3.62%	6,162
Obion	6,168	49.58%	6,056	48.68%	216	1.74%	112	0.90%	12,440
Overton	2,875	38.35%	4,507	60.13%	114	1.52%	-1,632	-21.78%	7,496
Perry	1,165	40.65%	1,650	57.57%	51	1.78%	-485	-16.92%	2,866
Pickett	1,281	57.21%	939	41.94%	19	0.85%	342	15.27%	2,239
Polk	2,907	51.97%	2,574	46.01%	113	2.02%	333	5.96%	5,594
Putnam	11,248	50.13%	10,785	48.07%	405	1.80%	463	2.06%	22,438
Rhea	5,900	60.38%	3,722	38.09%	150	1.53%	2,178	22.29%	9,772
Roane	11,345	53.20%	9,575	44.90%	406	1.90%	1,770	8.30%	21,326
Robertson	9,675	47.98%	10,249	50.83%	240	1.19%	-574	-2.85%	20,164
Rutherford	33,445	53.79%	27,360	44.00%	1,377	2.21%	6,085	9.79%	62,182
Scott	3,579	54.10%	2,967	44.85%	69	1.04%	612	9.25%	6,615
Sequatchie	2,169	55.80%	1,648	42.40%	70	1.80%	521	13.40%	3,887
Sevier	16,734	65.97%	8,208	32.36%	423	1.67%	8,526	33.61%	25,365
Shelby	141,756	42.09%	190,404	56.54%	4,595	1.36%	-48,648	-14.45%	336,755
Smith	2,384	32.44%	4,884	66.47%	80	1.09%	-2,500	-34.03%	7,348
Stewart	1,826	38.18%	2,870	60.02%	86	1.80%	-1,044	-21.84%	4,782
Sullivan	33,482	60.08%	21,354	38.32%	891	1.60%	12,128	21.76%	55,727
Sumner	27,601	54.68%	22,118	43.82%	758	1.50%	5,483	10.86%	50,477
Tipton	10,070	60.84%	6,300	38.06%	182	1.10%	3,770	22.78%	16,552
Trousdale	950	32.26%	1,966	66.76%	29	0.98%	-1,016	-34.50%	2,945
Unicoi	3,780	58.80%	2,566	39.91%	83	1.29%	1,215	18.89%	6,429
Union	3,199	54.96%	2,564	44.05%	58	1.00%	635	10.91%	5,821
Van Buren	845	39.65%	1,255	58.89%	31	1.45%	-410	-19.24%	2,131
Warren	5,552	42.28%	7,378	56.19%	201	1.53%	-1,826	-13.91%	13,131
Washington	22,579	59.51%	14,769	38.93%	594	1.57%	7,810	20.58%	37,942
Wayne	3,370	63.51%	1,859	35.04%	77	1.45%	1,511	28.47%	5,306
Weakley	6,106	51.55%	5,570	47.03%	168	1.42%	536	4.52%	11,844
White	3,525	45.34%	4,135	53.18%	115	1.48%	-610	-7.84%	7,775
Williamson	38,901	66.58%	18,745	32.08%	783	1.34%	20,156	34.50%	58,429
Wilson	18,844	52.47%	16,561	46.11%	511	1.42%	2,283	6.36%	35,916
Totals	1,061,949	51.15%	981,720	47.28%	32,512	1.57%	80,229	3.87%	2,076,181

===== Counties that flipped from Democratic to Republican =====
- Anderson (largest city: Oak Ridge)
- Carroll (largest city: McKenzie)
- Cheatham (largest city: Ashland City)
- Coffee (largest city: Tullahoma)
- Dyer (largest city: Dyersburg)
- Fayette (largest town: Oakland)
- Fentress (largest city: Jamestown)
- Lawrence (largest city: Lawrenceburg)
- Maury (largest city: Columbia)
- McNairy (largest city: Selmer)
- Meigs (largest city: Decatur)
- Montgomery (largest city: Clarksville)
- Moore (largest city: Lynchburg)
- Morgan (largest city: Coalfield)
- Obion (largest city: Union City)
- Polk (largest city: Benton)
- Putnam (largest city: Cookeville)
- Roane (largest city: Oak Ridge)
- Sequatchie (largest city: Dunlap)
- Union (largest city: Maynardville)
- Weakley (largest city: Martin)

==== By congressional district ====
Bush won six of nine congressional districts, including one held by a Democrat.

District	Gore	Bush	Representative
1st	37%	61%	Bill Jenkins
2nd	40%	58%	Jimmy Duncan
3rd	45%	53%	Zach Wamp
4th	46%	52%	Van Hilleary
5th	58%	40%	Bob Clement
6th	45%	54%	Bart Gordon
7th	44%	54%	Ed Bryant
8th	50%	49%	John S. Tanner
9th	77%	22%	Harold Ford Jr.

== Electors ==
The electors of each state and the District of Columbia met on December 18, 2000 to cast their votes for president and vice president. The Electoral College itself never meets as one body. Instead, the electors from each state and the District of Columbia met in their respective capitols.

The following were the members of the Electoral College from the state. All were pledged to and voted for George Bush and Dick Cheney:

1. Lamar Alexander
2. Daniel Dirksen Baker
3. Lana Bowman Ball
4. Nancy Cunningham
5. Winfield Dunn
6. Jimmy Exum
7. Jim Henry
8. Raja Jubran
9. Anie Kent
10. Patti Saliba
11. Mamon Wright

== Analysis ==
Along with his razor-thin loss in Florida, this was the closest Gore came to winning any Southern state. Gore lost his home state due to Bush's gains in rural counties, overcoming Gore's gains in Davidson County (home to Nashville, Tennessee) and Shelby County (home to Memphis). In the concurrent 2000 United States Senate election in Tennessee, Republican Bill Frist won the state by 33%, a harbinger of the state's further shift rightward in future years.

== See also ==
- Presidency of George W. Bush
- 2000 Tennessee elections
- 2000 United States elections
