= Waverly disaster =

Waverly disaster may refer to two events which have occurred in Waverly, Tennessee:

- Waverly, Tennessee, tank car explosion
- 2021 Tennessee floods
