= 2000 United States Senate election in Tennessee =

- November 7, 2000
- Turnout: 63.03% ▲6.41 pp
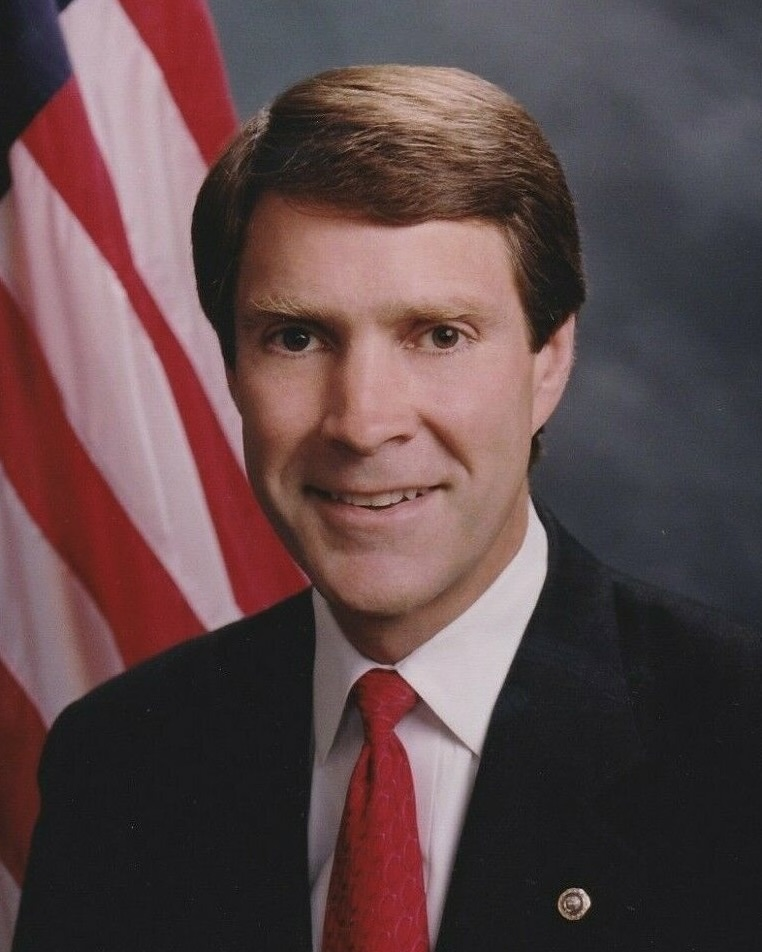

Nominee	Bill Frist	Jeff Clark
Party	Republican	Democratic
Popular vote	1,255,444	621,152
Percentage	65.10%	32.21%
- Frist: 40–50% 50–60% 60–70% 70–80% 80–90% Clark: 40–50% 50–60% 60–70% 70–80% 80–90% Tie: 50% No data
U.S. senator before election
Bill Frist
Republican
Elected U.S. Senator
Bill Frist
Republican

The 2000 United States Senate election in Tennessee took place on November 7, 2000. Republican incumbent Bill Frist was re-elected to a second term in office by a landslide over Jeff Clark, despite Republican presidential nominee George W. Bush carrying the state by a much closer margin against Tennessee native Al Gore in the concurrent presidential election.

As of 2026, this was the last time a Republican won 60 percent of the vote in Davidson County in a statewide election.

== Republican primary ==
=== Candidates ===
- Bill Frist, incumbent U.S. senator since 1995

=== Results ===
Bill Frist, incumbent U.S. Senator was unopposed in the Republican primary. He received 186,882 votes.

Republican primary results
Party	Candidate	Votes	%
Republican	Bill Frist (Incumbent)	186,882	100.00%
Total votes		186,882	100.00%

== Democratic primary ==
=== Candidates ===
- Jeff Clark, Middle Tennessee State University professor
- John Jay Hooker, attorney and perennial candidate
- James Looney
- Mary Taylor-Shelby
- Shannon Wood

=== Results ===
The Democratic primary was held on August 3, 2000. In a field of five candidates, Jeff Clark, a professor at Middle Tennessee State University, edged out John Jay Hooker to win the nomination.

Democratic primary results
Party	Candidate	Votes	%
Democratic	Jeff Clark	64,851	34.23%
Democratic	John Jay Hooker	64,041	33.81%
Democratic	Mary Taylor-Shelby	28,604	15.10%
Democratic	Shannon Wood	25,372	13.39%
Democratic	James Looney	6,354	3.35%
Democratic	Write-ins	218	0.12%
Total votes		189,440	100.00%

== General election ==
=== Candidates ===
- Tom Burrell (Green)
- Jeff Clark, Middle Tennessee State University professor (Democratic)
- Bill Frist, incumbent U.S. senator since 1995 (Republican)
- Charles F. Johnson (Independent)
- Joel Kinstle (Independent)
- David Jarrod Ownby (Independent)
- Robert Watson (Independent)

=== Polling ===
Poll source	Date(s)	Sample size	Margin of error	Bill Frist (R)	Jeff Clark (D)	Other / undecided (Note: Calculated by taking the difference of 100% and all other candidates combined.)
Zogby Analytics	November 5, 2000	490	—	62%	28%	10%
Harris Insights & Analytics	November 3, 2000	5,165	—	62%	35%	3%
Mason-Dixon Polling & Strategy	November 3, 2000	625	—	62%	30%	8%
Zogby Analytics	November 2, 2000	500	—	53%	34%	13%
Zogby Analytics	October 30, 2000	500	—	58%	29%	13%
Rasmussen Reports	October 28, 2000	722	—	57%	31%	12%
Zogby Analytics	October 27, 2000	500	—	61%	27%	12%
Rasmussen Reports	October 21, 2000	839	—	59%	30%	11%

=== Results ===
Tennessee United States Senate election, 2000
Party	Candidate	Votes	%	±%
Republican	Bill Frist (Incumbent)	1,255,444	65.10%	+8.75%
Democratic	Jeff Clark	621,152	32.21%	−9.89%
Green	Tom Burrell	25,815	1.34%	N/A
Independent	Charles F. Johnson	10,004	0.52%	+0.07
Independent	Robert Watson	8,416	0.44%	N/A
Independent	David Jarrod Ownby	4,388	0.23%	N/A
Independent	Joel Kinstle	3,135	0.16%	N/A
Write-in		259	0.00%	N/A
Majority		634,292	32.89%	N/A
Republican hold				

==== By county ====
County	Bill Frist Republican		Jeff Clark Democratic		Others Independent/Green		Margin	Total votes
County	%	#	%	#	%	#	Margin	Total votes
Anderson	68.24%	18,188	28.86%	7,692	2.90%	773	10,496	26,653
Bedford	62.33%	6,683	36.69%	3,934	0.98%	105	2,749	10,722
Benton	51.02%	3,071	47.55%	2,862	1.43%	146	209	6,079
Bledsoe	65.33%	2,636	32.52%	1,312	2.16%	87	1,324	4,035
Blount	75.16%	28,536	20.74%	7,876	4.10%	1,557	20,660	37,969
Bradley	77.44%	22,264	20.68%	5,945	1.88%	542	16,319	28,751
Campbell	61.49%	6,480	36.67%	3,864	1.84%	194	2,616	10,538
Cannon	56.69%	2,393	40.39%	1,705	2.91%	123	688	4,221
Carroll	64.68%	6,513	33.67%	3,391	1.65%	166	3,122	10,070
Carter	75.00%	13,497	22.86%	4,115	2.14%	385	9,382	17,997
Cheatham	67.59%	7,967	28.50%	3,359	3.92%	462	4,608	11,788
Chester	71.08%	3,702	26.56%	1,383	2.36%	123	2,319	5,208
Claiborne	68.51%	5,530	29.04%	2,344	2.45%	198	3,186	8,072
Clay	57.44%	1,514	41.27%	1,088	1.29%	34	426	2,636
Cocke	76.21%	6,557	20.86%	1,795	2.93%	252	4,762	8,604
Coffee	62.56%	10,188	36.35%	5,920	1.08%	176	4,268	16,284
Crockett	65.50%	3,282	33.15%	1,661	1.36%	68	1,621	5,011
Cumberland	70.15%	12,322	26.72%	4,693	3.14%	551	7,629	17,566
Davidson	60.44%	117,611	35.16%	68,424	4.40%	8,563	49,187	194,598
Decatur	59.92%	2,423	38.92%	1,574	1.16%	47	849	4,044
DeKalb	54.99%	2,948	42.01%	2,252	3.00%	161	696	5,361
Dickson	60.95%	8,463	38.22%	5,307	0.84%	116	3,156	13,886
Dyer	65.87%	7,449	32.64%	3,691	1.49%	168	3,758	11,308
Fayette	64.86%	6,959	33.32%	3,575	1.82%	195	3,384	10,729
Fentress	69.84%	3,684	27.58%	1,455	2.58%	136	2,229	5,275
Franklin	56.15%	7,670	41.40%	5,655	2.46%	336	2,015	13,661
Gibson	62.05%	10,021	36.18%	5,843	1.77%	285	4,178	16,149
Giles	56.12%	5,059	40.63%	3,663	3.25%	293	1,396	9,015
Grainger	70.21%	4,019	27.06%	1,549	2.72%	156	2,470	5,724
Greene	75.10%	13,867	22.91%	4,230	1.99%	367	9,637	18,464
Grundy	46.18%	2,008	52.32%	2,275	1.49%	65	-267	4,348
Hamblen	72.53%	13,727	25.10%	4,750	2.38%	450	8,977	18,927
Hamilton	66.82%	78,652	31.21%	36,733	1.97%	2,325	41,919	117,710
Hancock	76.52%	1,320	20.41%	352	3.07%	53	968	1,725
Hardeman	57.34%	4,076	38.83%	2,760	3.83%	272	1,316	7,108
Hardin	69.19%	5,561	29.54%	2,374	1.27%	102	3,187	8,037
Hawkins	70.84%	11,203	26.72%	4,226	2.44%	386	6,977	15,815
Haywood	51.65%	3,063	47.08%	2,792	1.27%	75	271	5,930
Henderson	74.87%	5,757	23.03%	1,771	2.09%	161	3,986	7,689
Henry	59.20%	6,669	38.93%	4,386	1.87%	211	2,283	11,266
Hickman	55.39%	3,772	42.88%	2,920	1.73%	118	852	6,810
Houston	43.40%	1,168	56.19%	1,512	0.41%	11	-344	2,691
Humphreys	47.24%	2,997	50.84%	3,225	1.92%	122	-228	6,344
Jackson	42.86%	1,585	55.11%	2,038	2.03%	75	-453	3,698
Jefferson	74.16%	9,788	23.24%	3,068	2.60%	343	6,720	13,199
Johnson	76.60%	4,014	20.21%	1,059	3.19%	167	2,955	5,240
Knox	72.11%	101,551	24.98%	35,185	2.91%	4,099	66,366	140,835
Lake	51.21%	738	47.33%	682	1.46%	21	56	1,441
Lauderdale	56.58%	4,031	42.20%	3,006	1.22%	87	1,025	7,124
Lawrence	63.29%	8,197	35.66%	4,618	1.05%	136	3,579	12,951
Lewis	54.89%	2,334	41.42%	1,761	3.69%	157	573	4,252
Lincoln	59.70%	5,756	38.07%	3,670	2.23%	215	2,086	9,641
Loudon	72.35%	10,694	24.84%	3,672	2.80%	414	7,022	14,780
Macon	65.58%	3,601	33.05%	1,815	1.37%	75	1,786	5,491
Madison	67.32%	22,254	31.08%	10,273	1.60%	530	11,981	33,057
Marion	56.58%	5,592	41.74%	4,126	1.68%	166	1,466	9,884
Marshall	59.88%	5,246	37.69%	3,302	2.43%	213	1,944	8,761
Maury	61.99%	13,997	36.55%	8,252	1.46%	329	5,745	22,578
McMinn	71.29%	11,521	26.49%	4,281	2.22%	359	7,240	16,161
McNairy	67.79%	5,764	31.35%	2,666	0.86%	73	3,098	8,503
Meigs	65.19%	2,088	32.56%	1,043	2.25%	72	1,045	3,203
Monroe	67.33%	8,520	30.27%	3,831	2.40%	304	4,689	12,655
Montgomery	66.36%	24,382	31.46%	11,560	2.17%	798	12,822	36,740
Moore	63.03%	1,267	33.98%	683	2.99%	60	584	2,010
Morgan	62.69%	3,615	35.88%	2,069	1.42%	82	1,546	5,766
Obion	63.99%	6,002	34.14%	3,202	1.88%	176	2,800	9,380
Overton	49.83%	3,001	48.79%	2,938	1.38%	83	63	6,022
Perry	53.33%	1,294	44.71%	1,085	1.98%	48	209	2,427
Pickett	67.54%	1,346	31.31%	624	1.15%	23	722	1,993
Polk	58.61%	3,211	39.72%	2,176	1.68%	92	1,035	5,479
Putnam	63.89%	13,418	33.27%	6,987	2.85%	598	6,431	21,003
Rhea	72.26%	6,136	26.19%	2,224	1.54%	131	3,912	8,491
Roane	67.69%	13,646	29.70%	5,988	2.60%	525	7,658	20,159
Robertson	64.32%	12,135	34.24%	6,461	1.44%	272	5,674	18,868
Rutherford	67.56%	39,497	28.99%	16,947	3.45%	2,016	22,550	58,460
Scott	70.09%	3,695	28.89%	1,523	1.02%	54	2,172	5,272
Sequatchie	68.07%	2,560	30.50%	1,147	1.44%	54	1,413	3,761
Sevier	76.75%	18,237	17.67%	4,198	5.58%	1,326	14,039	23,761
Shelby	55.56%	171,249	41.12%	126,721	3.32%	10,232	44,528	308,202
Smith	48.52%	2,927	50.17%	3,027	1.31%	79	-100	6,033
Stewart	49.62%	2,212	47.85%	2,133	2.53%	113	79	4,458
Sullivan	72.53%	38,463	25.51%	13,527	1.96%	1,042	24,936	53,032
Sumner	68.81%	32,919	29.15%	13,943	2.04%	978	18,976	47,840
Tipton	68.70%	10,933	28.86%	4,593	2.45%	390	6,340	15,916
Trousdale	49.80%	1,248	47.69%	1,195	2.51%	63	53	2,506
Unicoi	74.14%	3,986	24.01%	1,291	1.84%	99	2,695	5,376
Union	69.38%	3,454	29.55%	1,471	1.06%	53	1,983	4,978
Van Buren	57.33%	986	41.40%	712	1.28%	22	274	1,720
Warren	57.76%	7,096	39.74%	4,882	2.51%	308	2,214	12,286
Washington	72.35%	25,481	25.14%	8,856	2.51%	883	16,625	35,220
Wayne	71.85%	3,236	27.44%	1,236	0.71%	32	2,000	4,504
Weakley	61.16%	6,936	37.39%	4,240	1.45%	164	2,696	11,340
White	58.24%	4,505	39.68%	3,069	2.08%	161	1,436	7,735
Williamson	80.12%	44,850	17.45%	9,768	2.43%	1,358	35,082	55,976
Wilson	67.75%	22,781	30.02%	10,095	2.23%	751	12,686	33,627
Total	65.10%	1,255,444	32.21%	621,152	2.70%	52,017	634,292	1,928,613

=== Counties that flipped from Democratic to Republican ===
- White (Largest city: Sparta)
- Cannon (Largest city: Woodbury)
- DeKalb (Largest city: Smithville)
- Franklin (Largest city: Winchester)
- Grundy (largest municipality: Altamont)
- Van Buren (largest municipality: Spencer)
- Perry (largest municipality: Linden)
- Dickson (Largest city: Dickson)
- Haywood (largest city: Brownsville)
- Lake (largest municipality: Tiptonville)
- Stewart (largest municipality: Dover)
- Benton (largest municipality: Camden)
- Houston (largest city: Erin)
- Humphreys (largest municipality: Waverly)
- Hickman (Largest city: Centerville)
- Giles (Largest city: Pulaski)
- Marshall (Largest city: Lewisburg)
- Bedford (Largest city: Shelbyville)
- Smith (largest municipality: Carthage)
- Trousdale (largest municipality: Hartsville)
- Clay (largest municipality: Celina)
- Overton (largest municipality: Livingston)
- Jackson (largest town: Gainesboro)

== See also ==
- 2000 United States Senate elections
- 2000 Tennessee elections
