= 1968 United States presidential election in Tennessee =

- November 5, 1968

| Nominee | Richard Nixon | George Wallace | Hubert Humphrey |
| Party | Republican | American | Democratic |
| Home state | New York (Note: Although he was born in California and he served as a U.S. senator from California, in 1968 Richard Nixon's official state of residence was New York, because he moved there to practice law after his defeat in the 1962 California gubernatorial election. During his first term as president, Nixon re-established his residency in California. Consequently, most reliable reference books list Nixon's home state as New York in the 1968 election and his home state as California in the 1972 (and 1960) election.) | Alabama | Minnesota |
| Running mate | Spiro Agnew | Curtis LeMay | Edmund Muskie |
| Electoral vote | 11 | 0 | 0 |
| Popular vote | 472,592 | 424,792 | 351,233 |
| Percentage | 37.85% | 34.02% | 28.13% |

Nixon
30–40%
40–50%
50–60%
60–70%
70–80%
Wallace
30–40%
40–50%
50–60%
60–70%
Humphrey
30–40%
40–50%
President before election
Lyndon B. Johnson
Democratic
Elected President
Richard Nixon
Republican

The 1968 United States presidential election in Tennessee took place on November 5, 1968. All 50 states and the District of Columbia were part of the 1968 United States presidential election. Tennessee voters chose 11 electors to the Electoral College, who voted for president and vice president.

Tennessee voted more or less equally for the candidates, resulting in Republican candidate Richard Nixon of New York and his running mate Governor Spiro Agnew of Maryland receiving a plurality of the votes as opposed to a majority. Tennessee had the smallest percentage of the Nixon vote that delivered him the state.

Nixon carried Tennessee with 37.85% of the vote to American Independence Party candidate George Wallace’s 34.02% and Democratic candidate Hubert Humphrey's 28.13%, a victory margin of 3.87%. Nixon's victory was due to his large margins in traditionally Republican East Tennessee, while Wallace and Humphrey split Middle Tennessee and West Tennessee. As of the 2024 presidential election, this is the last election in which Hamilton County did not support the Republican presidential candidate.

Among white voters, 43% supported Nixon, 39% supported Wallace, and 19% supported Humphrey.

== Results ==
1968 United States presidential election in Tennessee
| Party | Candidate | Votes | Percentage | Electoral votes |
|---|---|---|---|---|
| Republican | Richard Nixon | 472,592 | 37.85% | 11 |
| American | George Wallace | 424,792 | 34.02% | 0 |
| Democratic | Hubert Humphrey | 351,233 | 28.13% | 0 |
| Write-ins | Write-ins | 10 | 0.00% | 0 |
| Totals | | 1,248,617 | 100.00% | 11 |
| Voter turnout | | | | - |

=== Results by county ===
| County | Richard Nixon Republican | | George Wallace American Independent | | Hubert Humphrey Democratic | | Margin | | Total votes cast |
| County | # | % | # | % | # | % | # | % | Total votes cast |
|---|---|---|---|---|---|---|---|---|---|
| Anderson | 10,233 | 47.04% | 4,323 | 19.87% | 7,198 | 33.09% | 3,035 (Note: In this county where Wallace did run third behind both Nixon and Humphrey, margin given is Nixon vote minus Humphrey vote and percentage margin Nixon percentage minus Humphrey percentage.) | 13.95% | 21,754 |
| Bedford | 1,870 | 22.30% | 4,099 | 48.88% | 2,416 | 28.81% | -1,683 (Note: In this county where Nixon ran third behind both Wallace and Humphrey, margin given is Humphrey vote minus Wallace vote and percentage margin Humphrey percentage minus Wallace percentage.) | -20.07% | 8,385 |
| Benton | 1,468 | 30.70% | 2,255 | 47.16% | 1,059 | 22.15% | -787 | -16.46% | 4,782 |
| Bledsoe | 1,477 | 46.65% | 732 | 23.12% | 957 | 30.23% | 520 | 16.42% | 3,166 |
| Blount | 12,753 | 57.10% | 4,407 | 19.73% | 5,176 | 23.17% | 7,577 | 33.93% | 22,336 |
| Bradley | 6,924 | 50.01% | 4,159 | 30.04% | 2,762 | 19.95% | 2,765 | 19.97% | 13,845 |
| Campbell | 4,024 | 52.54% | 1,367 | 17.85% | 2,268 | 29.61% | 1,756 | 22.93% | 7,659 |
| Cannon | 780 | 25.55% | 1,464 | 47.95% | 809 | 26.50% | -655 | -21.45% | 3,053 |
| Carroll | 3,757 | 41.80% | 3,298 | 36.70% | 1,932 | 21.50% | 459 | 5.10% | 8,987 |
| Carter | 9,467 | 64.68% | 3,009 | 20.56% | 2,160 | 14.76% | 6,458 | 44.12% | 14,636 |
| Cheatham | 669 | 16.96% | 2,497 | 63.31% | 778 | 19.73% | -1,719 | -43.58% | 3,944 |
| Chester | 1,408 | 32.79% | 2,037 | 47.44% | 849 | 19.77% | -629 | -14.65% | 4,294 |
| Claiborne | 3,101 | 59.75% | 775 | 14.93% | 1,314 | 25.32% | 1,787 | 34.43% | 5,190 |
| Clay | 814 | 42.13% | 451 | 23.34% | 667 | 34.52% | 147 | 7.61% | 1,932 |
| Cocke | 5,645 | 72.80% | 1,159 | 14.95% | 950 | 12.25% | 4,486 | 57.85% | 7,754 |
| Coffee | 3,337 | 29.87% | 4,794 | 42.91% | 3,040 | 27.21% | -1,457 | -13.04% | 11,171 |
| Crockett | 932 | 20.71% | 2,865 | 63.67% | 703 | 15.62% | -1,933 | -42.96% | 4,500 |
| Cumberland | 3,115 | 51.81% | 1,469 | 24.43% | 1,428 | 23.75% | 1,646 | 27.38% | 6,012 |
| Davidson | 44,175 | 32.34% | 47,889 | 35.06% | 44,543 | 32.61% | -3,346 | -2.45% | 136,607 |
| Decatur | 1,409 | 36.79% | 1,544 | 40.31% | 877 | 22.90% | -135 | -3.52% | 3,830 |
| DeKalb | 1,532 | 39.33% | 1,516 | 38.92% | 847 | 21.75% | 16 | 0.41% | 3,895 |
| Dickson | 1,291 | 18.99% | 3,475 | 51.10% | 2,034 | 29.91% | -1,441 | -21.19% | 6,800 |
| Dyer | 2,826 | 26.41% | 5,842 | 54.59% | 2,033 | 19.00% | -3,016 | -28.18% | 10,701 |
| Fayette | 740 | 13.34% | 2,570 | 46.34% | 2,236 | 40.32% | -334 | -6.02% | 5,546 |
| Fentress | 2,026 | 57.80% | 808 | 23.05% | 671 | 19.14% | 1,218 | 34.75% | 3,505 |
| Franklin | 1,700 | 18.62% | 4,939 | 54.11% | 2,489 | 27.27% | -2,450 | -26.84% | 9,128 |
| Gibson | 4,093 | 26.77% | 7,233 | 47.31% | 3,962 | 25.92% | -3,140 | -20.54% | 15,288 |
| Giles | 1,264 | 17.01% | 3,966 | 53.36% | 2,203 | 29.64% | -1,763 | -23.72% | 7,433 |
| Grainger | 2,788 | 67.26% | 596 | 14.38% | 761 | 18.36% | 2,027 | 48.90% | 4,145 |
| Greene | 7,957 | 58.26% | 2,753 | 20.16% | 2,947 | 21.58% | 5,010 | 36.68% | 13,657 |
| Grundy | 618 | 17.33% | 1,642 | 46.03% | 1,307 | 36.64% | -335 | -9.39% | 3,567 |
| Hamblen | 6,382 | 57.86% | 2,259 | 20.48% | 2,390 | 21.67% | 3,992 | 36.19% | 11,031 |
| Hamilton | 29,302 | 34.54% | 32,080 | 37.82% | 23,441 | 27.64% | -2,778 | -3.28% | 84,823 |
| Hancock | 1,489 | 72.88% | 236 | 11.55% | 318 | 15.57% | 1,171 | 57.31% | 2,043 |
| Hardeman | 1,171 | 20.18% | 2,924 | 50.38% | 1,709 | 29.45% | -1,215 | -20.93% | 5,804 |
| Hardin | 2,910 | 45.55% | 2,325 | 36.40% | 1,153 | 18.05% | 585 | 9.15% | 6,388 |
| Hawkins | 6,217 | 60.78% | 1,798 | 17.58% | 2,213 | 21.64% | 4,004 | 39.14% | 10,228 |
| Haywood | 1,152 | 20.51% | 2,757 | 49.07% | 1,709 | 30.42% | -1,048 | -18.65% | 5,618 |
| Henderson | 3,591 | 51.99% | 2,086 | 30.20% | 1,230 | 17.81% | 1,505 | 21.79% | 6,907 |
| Henry | 2,068 | 23.89% | 3,439 | 39.73% | 3,149 | 36.38% | -290 | -3.35% | 8,656 |
| Hickman | 760 | 17.33% | 2,473 | 56.40% | 1,152 | 26.27% | -1,321 | -30.13% | 4,385 |
| Houston | 232 | 12.82% | 941 | 52.02% | 636 | 35.16% | -305 | -16.86% | 1,809 |
| Humphreys | 866 | 19.90% | 2,095 | 48.14% | 1,391 | 31.96% | -704 | -16.18% | 4,352 |
| Jackson | 673 | 24.90% | 908 | 33.59% | 1,122 | 41.51% | 214 | 7.92% | 2,703 |
| Jefferson | 5,494 | 67.11% | 1,199 | 14.65% | 1,494 | 18.25% | 4,000 | 48.86% | 8,187 |
| Johnson | 3,107 | 79.02% | 375 | 9.54% | 450 | 11.44% | 2,657 | 67.58% | 3,932 |
| Knox | 47,202 | 52.44% | 18,277 | 20.31% | 24,528 | 27.25% | 22,674 | 25.19% | 90,007 |
| Lake | 409 | 16.99% | 1,262 | 52.41% | 737 | 30.61% | -525 | -21.80% | 2,408 |
| Lauderdale | 1,080 | 15.99% | 3,566 | 52.80% | 2,108 | 31.21% | -1,458 | -21.59% | 6,754 |
| Lawrence | 4,343 | 41.26% | 3,993 | 37.93% | 2,191 | 20.81% | 350 | 3.33% | 10,527 |
| Lewis | 455 | 17.91% | 997 | 39.25% | 1,088 | 42.83% | 91 | 3.58% | 2,540 |
| Lincoln | 1,167 | 16.14% | 4,214 | 58.29% | 1,848 | 25.56% | -2,366 | -32.73% | 7,229 |
| Loudon | 4,299 | 54.58% | 1,996 | 25.34% | 1,581 | 20.07% | 2,303 | 29.24% | 7,876 |
| Macon | 2,173 | 58.04% | 1,041 | 27.80% | 530 | 14.16% | 1,132 | 30.24% | 3,744 |
| Madison | 6,143 | 29.14% | 9,420 | 44.69% | 5,517 | 26.17% | -3,277 | -15.55% | 21,080 |
| Marion | 1,959 | 30.59% | 2,784 | 43.47% | 1,661 | 25.94% | -825 | -12.88% | 6,404 |
| Marshall | 1,202 | 19.68% | 3,379 | 55.32% | 1,527 | 25.00% | -1,852 | -30.32% | 6,108 |
| Maury | 3,048 | 20.88% | 8,148 | 55.82% | 3,401 | 23.30% | -4,747 | -32.52% | 14,597 |
| McMinn | 6,098 | 52.92% | 2,535 | 22.00% | 2,889 | 25.07% | 3,209 | 27.85% | 11,522 |
| McNairy | 2,979 | 41.21% | 2,872 | 39.73% | 1,377 | 19.05% | 107 | 1.48% | 7,228 |
| Meigs | 729 | 43.81% | 442 | 26.56% | 493 | 29.63% | 236 | 14.18% | 1,664 |
| Monroe | 4,749 | 53.38% | 1,222 | 13.73% | 2,926 | 32.89% | 1,823 | 20.49% | 8,897 |
| Montgomery | 3,248 | 22.52% | 5,638 | 39.09% | 5,538 | 38.39% | -100 | -0.70% | 14,424 |
| Moore | 224 | 15.71% | 856 | 60.03% | 346 | 24.26% | -510 | -35.77% | 1,426 |
| Morgan | 1,803 | 47.46% | 1,028 | 27.06% | 968 | 25.48% | 775 | 20.40% | 3,799 |
| Obion | 2,420 | 25.92% | 4,680 | 50.13% | 2,235 | 23.94% | -2,260 | -24.21% | 9,335 |
| Overton | 1,258 | 31.25% | 1,176 | 29.21% | 1,592 | 39.54% | -334 | -8.29% | 4,026 |
| Perry | 519 | 25.58% | 784 | 38.64% | 726 | 35.78% | -58 | -2.86% | 2,029 |
| Pickett | 884 | 59.41% | 199 | 13.37% | 405 | 27.22% | 479 | 32.19% | 1,488 |
| Polk | 1,808 | 45.02% | 754 | 18.77% | 1,454 | 36.21% | 354 | 8.81% | 4,016 |
| Putnam | 3,693 | 35.83% | 3,073 | 29.81% | 3,541 | 34.36% | 152 | 1.47% | 10,307 |
| Rhea | 2,428 | 40.70% | 2,237 | 37.50% | 1,301 | 21.81% | 191 | 3.20% | 5,966 |
| Roane | 6,033 | 45.74% | 3,898 | 29.55% | 3,258 | 24.70% | 2,135 | 16.19% | 13,189 |
| Robertson | 1,802 | 22.47% | 3,904 | 48.67% | 2,315 | 28.86% | -1,589 | -19.81% | 8,021 |
| Rutherford | 4,168 | 24.72% | 7,773 | 46.10% | 4,921 | 29.18% | -2,852 | -16.92% | 16,862 |
| Scott | 2,406 | 58.24% | 734 | 17.77% | 991 | 23.99% | 1,415 | 34.25% | 4,131 |
| Sequatchie | 663 | 29.82% | 1,011 | 45.48% | 549 | 24.70% | -348 | -15.66% | 2,223 |
| Sevier | 7,629 | 74.67% | 1,476 | 14.45% | 1,112 | 10.88% | 6,153 | 60.22% | 10,217 |
| Shelby | 73,416 | 31.66% | 76,996 | 33.20% | 81,486 | 35.14% | 4,490 | 1.94% | 231,898 |
| Smith | 1,089 | 24.96% | 1,831 | 41.97% | 1,443 | 33.07% | -388 | -8.90% | 4,363 |
| Stewart | 443 | 17.43% | 1,057 | 41.60% | 1,041 | 40.97% | -16 | -0.63% | 2,541 |
| Sullivan | 20,251 | 50.60% | 9,991 | 24.96% | 9,783 | 24.44% | 10,260 | 25.64% | 40,025 |
| Sumner | 4,519 | 27.41% | 7,592 | 46.05% | 4,376 | 26.54% | -3,073 | -18.64% | 16,487 |
| Tipton | 1,422 | 16.86% | 4,943 | 58.59% | 2,071 | 24.55% | -2,872 | -34.04% | 8,436 |
| Trousdale | 252 | 15.80% | 649 | 40.69% | 694 | 43.51% | 45 | 2.82% | 1,595 |
| Unicoi | 3,327 | 65.49% | 843 | 16.59% | 910 | 17.91% | 2,417 | 47.58% | 5,080 |
| Union | 1,956 | 66.71% | 449 | 15.31% | 527 | 17.97% | 1,429 | 48.74% | 2,932 |
| Van Buren | 327 | 29.30% | 507 | 45.43% | 282 | 25.27% | -180 | -16.13% | 1,116 |
| Warren | 1,858 | 24.07% | 3,814 | 49.42% | 2,046 | 26.51% | -1,768 | -22.91% | 7,718 |
| Washington | 12,882 | 56.66% | 4,925 | 21.66% | 4,930 | 21.68% | 7,952 | 34.98% | 22,737 |
| Wayne | 2,417 | 58.51% | 1,208 | 29.24% | 506 | 12.25% | 1,209 | 29.27% | 4,131 |
| Weakley | 2,858 | 30.50% | 4,525 | 48.29% | 1,988 | 21.21% | -1,667 | -17.79% | 9,371 |
| White | 1,423 | 29.91% | 1,750 | 36.79% | 1,584 | 33.30% | -166 | -3.49% | 4,757 |
| Williamson | 2,788 | 28.69% | 4,867 | 50.08% | 2,063 | 21.23% | -2,079 | -21.39% | 9,718 |
| Wilson | 2,736 | 24.21% | 5,648 | 49.98% | 2,916 | 25.81% | -2,732 | -24.17% | 11,300 |
| Totals | 472,592 | 37.85% | 424,792 | 34.02% | 351,233 | 28.13% | 47,800 | 3.83% | 1,248,617 (Note: This total includes 10 write-in votes not separated by county.) |

==== Counties that flipped from Democratic to American Independent ====
- Bedford
- Benton
- Cannon
- Cheatham
- Coffee
- Davidson
- Decatur
- Dickson
- Dyer
- Franklin
- Gibson
- Giles
- Grundy
- Hardeman
- Henry
- Hickman
- Houston
- Humphreys
- Lake
- Lauderdale
- Lincoln
- Marion
- Marshall
- Maury
- Montgomery
- Moore
- Obion
- Perry
- Robertson
- Rutherford
- Sequatchie
- Smith
- Stewart
- Sumner
- Tipton
- Van Buren
- Warren
- Weakley
- White
- Williamson
- Wilson

==== Counties that flipped from Republican to American Independent ====
- Chester
- Crockett
- Fayette
- Hamilton
- Haywood
- Madison

==== Counties that flipped from Democratic to Republican ====
- Anderson
- Campbell
- Carroll
- Clay
- Cumberland
- DeKalb
- Lawrence
- Morgan
- Polk
- Putnam
- Roane
- Sullivan

== Works cited ==
- Black, Earl; Black, Merle (1992). The Vital South: How Presidents Are Elected. Harvard University Press. ISBN 0674941306.
