= Bill Frist =

American politician (born 1952)

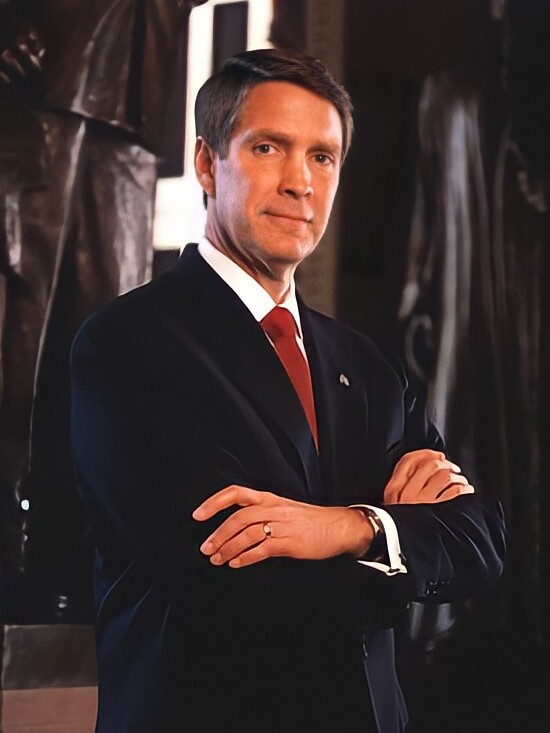
- Official portrait, c. 1995

Senate Majority Leader
- In office January 3, 2003 – January 3, 2007
- Whip: Mitch McConnell
- Preceded by: Tom Daschle
- Succeeded by: Harry Reid

United States Senator from Tennessee
- In office January 3, 1995 – January 3, 2007
- Preceded by: Jim Sasser
- Succeeded by: Bob Corker
Senate positions
Leader of the Senate Republican Conference
In office January 3, 2003 – January 3, 2007
Deputy	Mitch McConnell
Preceded by	Trent Lott
Succeeded by	Mitch McConnell
Chair of the National Republican Senatorial Committee
In office January 3, 2001 – January 3, 2003
Leader	Trent Lott
Preceded by	Mitch McConnell
Succeeded by	George Allen

Personal details
- Born: William Harrison Frist; February 22, 1952 (age 74) Nashville, Tennessee, U.S.
- Party: Republican
- Spouses: Karyn McLaughlin (m. 1981; div. 2012); Tracy Roberts (m. 2015)
- Children: 3
- Relatives: Thomas F. Frist Sr. (father)
- Education: Princeton University (BA); Harvard University (MD)
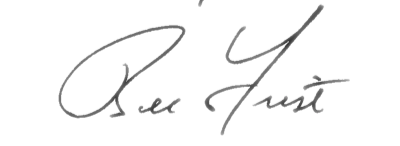
- Signature
- Frist's voice Frist supporting PEPFAR. Recorded May 13, 2003

William Harrison Frist (born February 22, 1952) is an American physician, businessman, and politician who served as a United States senator for Tennessee from 1995 to 2007. A member of the Republican Party, he also served as Senate majority leader from 2003 to 2007. Born in Nashville, Tennessee, Frist studied government and health care policy at Princeton University and earned a Doctor of Medicine degree from Harvard Medical School. He trained as a cardiothoracic transplant surgeon at Massachusetts General Hospital and Stanford University School of Medicine, and later founded the Vanderbilt Transplant Center. In the 1994 United States Senate election in Tennessee, he defeated incumbent Democratic senator Jim Sasser.

After serving as chairman of the National Republican Senatorial Committee, Frist succeeded Tom Daschle as the Senate Majority Leader. Frist helped pass several parts of President George W. Bush's domestic agenda, including the Jobs and Growth Tax Relief Reconciliation Act of 2003 and the Medicare Modernization Act. Frist left the Senate in 2007, honoring his pledge to serve no more than two terms.

In his post-Senate career, he serves as chair of the global board of The Nature Conservancy. He is also a founding partner of Frist Cressey Ventures, a special partner and chairman of the Executives Council of the health service investment firm Cressey & Company, and co-chair of the Health Project at the Bipartisan Policy Center. From 2019 to 2022, he hosted the A Second Opinion Podcast on the intersection of policy, medicine, and innovation.

== Early life and education ==
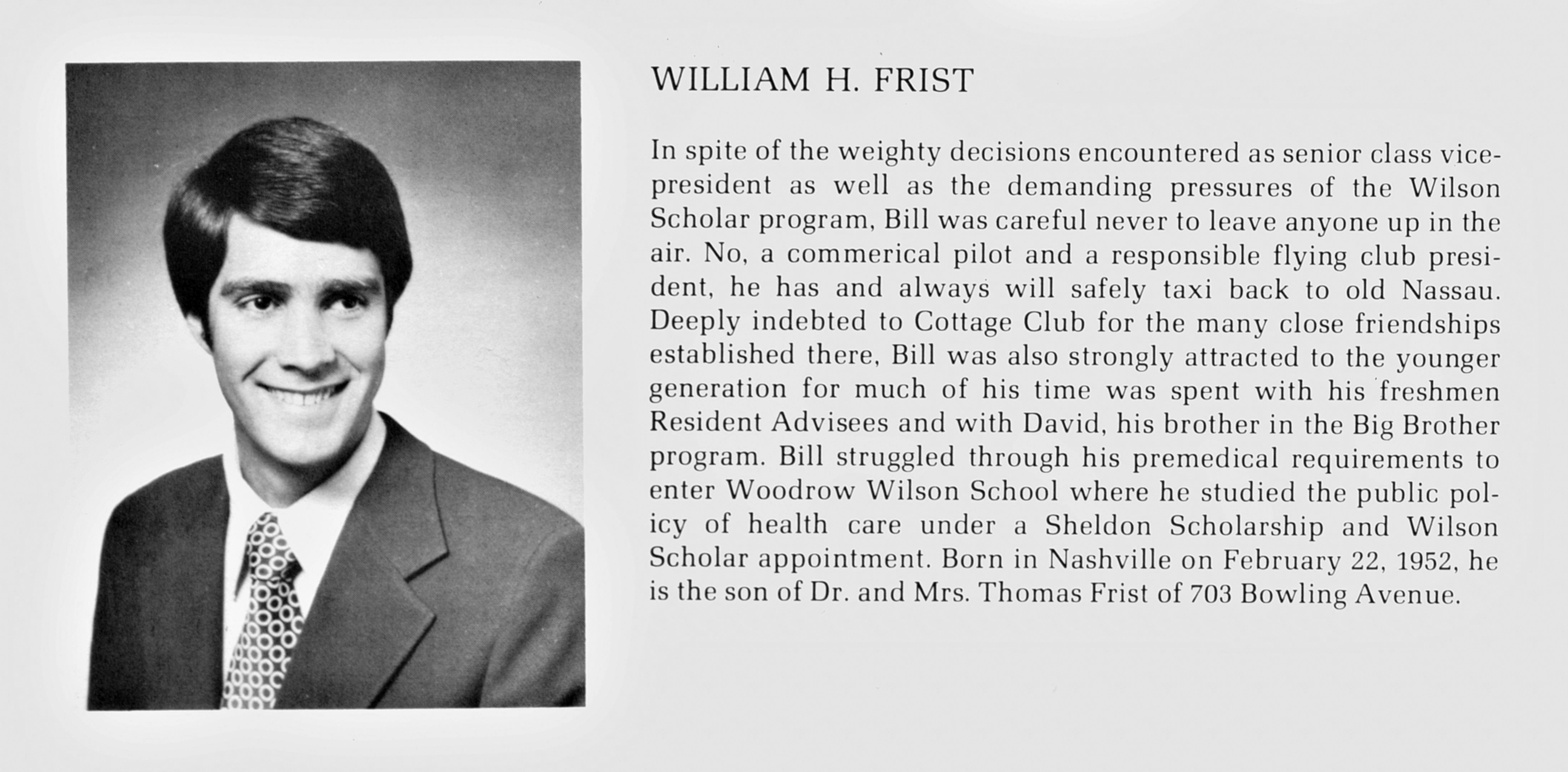
Frist in the Princeton University yearbook, 1974

Frist was born in Nashville, Tennessee, the son of Dorothy (née Cate) Frist and Thomas Fearn Frist Sr. He is a fourth-generation Tennessean. His father was a doctor and co-founded the health care business organization which became Hospital Corporation of America (HCA). Frist's brother, HCA co-founder Thomas F. Frist, Jr., became chairman and chief executive of HCA in 1997. His other siblings include Robert A. Frist; Dorothy F. Boensch; and Mary F. Barfield.

Frist graduated in 1970 from Montgomery Bell Academy in Nashville, and then from Princeton University's Woodrow Wilson School of Public and International Affairs in 1974. Frist was a member of University Cottage Club while he was a student at Princeton. In 1972, he held a summer internship with Tennessee congressman Joe L. Evins, who advised Frist that if he wanted to pursue a political career, he should first have a career outside politics. Frist proceeded to Harvard Medical School, where he received the degree of Doctor of Medicine with honors in 1978.

While he was a medical school student in the 1970s, Frist acknowledged in his book Transplant that he performed medical experiments and vivisection on shelter cats while conducting research at Harvard Medical School. He writes about having succumbed to the pressure to succeed in a highly competitive medical school, acknowledging it was "a heinous and dishonest thing to do." This issue became controversial in his first Senate campaign in 1994, and gained national attention after his election to Senate majority leader.

== Medical career ==
While in medical school, Frist joined the laboratory of W. John Powell Jr. at Massachusetts General Hospital in 1977, where he continued his training in cardiovascular physiology. In 1978, he became a resident in surgery at Massachusetts General Hospital. In 1983, he spent time at Southampton General Hospital, Southampton, England as a senior registrar in cardiothoracic surgery. He returned to Massachusetts General in 1984 as chief resident and fellow in cardiothoracic surgery. From 1985 until 1986, Frist was a senior fellow and chief resident in cardiac transplant service and cardiothoracic surgery at the Stanford University School of Medicine. There, he trained under Norman Shumway, a pioneering surgeon known as the father of heart transplantation.

After completing his fellowship, Frist became a faculty member at Vanderbilt University Medical Center, where he began a heart and lung transplantation program. There, he performed the first heart-lung transplant in the Southeast. And in 1990, he performed Tennessee's first single-lung transplant, a notoriously difficult procedure. He also served as a staff surgeon at the Nashville Veterans Administration Hospital. In 1989, he founded the Vanderbilt Transplant Center, which today performs more heart transplants than any other center in the world.

In 1991 Frist operated on then–Lieutenant Colonel David Petraeus after he had been shot in a training accident at Fort Campbell. Their paths crossed again when Frist was elected to the Senate and Petraeus rose through the military ranks to General. They later ran the Army 10-miler together in 2002 in Washington, DC.

In 1992, Frist organized a statewide grassroots campaign to return the organ donation card to the Tennessee driver's license and received the Distinguished Service Award from the Tennessee Medical Association for his efforts.

In 1995 Frist, then a sitting senator, successfully resuscitated a constituent suffering a heart attack in the Dirksen Senate Office building.

In 1998, Frist administered emergency aid to victims and the shooter in the 1998 Capitol Shooting.

Frist regularly participated in global medical mission and international relief trips, often with non-profit Samaritan's Purse, providing medical aid in sub-Saharan Africa and taking part in emergency response to hurricanes (Katrina), earthquakes (Haiti), tsunami (Sri Lanka) and famine (Sudan and Ethiopia).

During his 20 years in medicine, Frist performed over 150 heart and lung transplants and authored over 100 peer-reviewed medical articles. He is board certified in both general and heart surgery.

== United States senator (1995–2007) ==
In 1990, Frist met with former Senate majority leader Howard Baker about the possibilities of public office. Baker advised him to pursue the Senate and suggested in 1992 that Frist begin preparations to run in 1994. Frist began to build support. He served on the Tennessee governor's Medicaid Task Force from 1992 to 1993, joined the National Steering Committee of the Republican National Committee's Health Care Coalition and was deputy director of the Tennessee Bush-Quayle 1992 campaign.

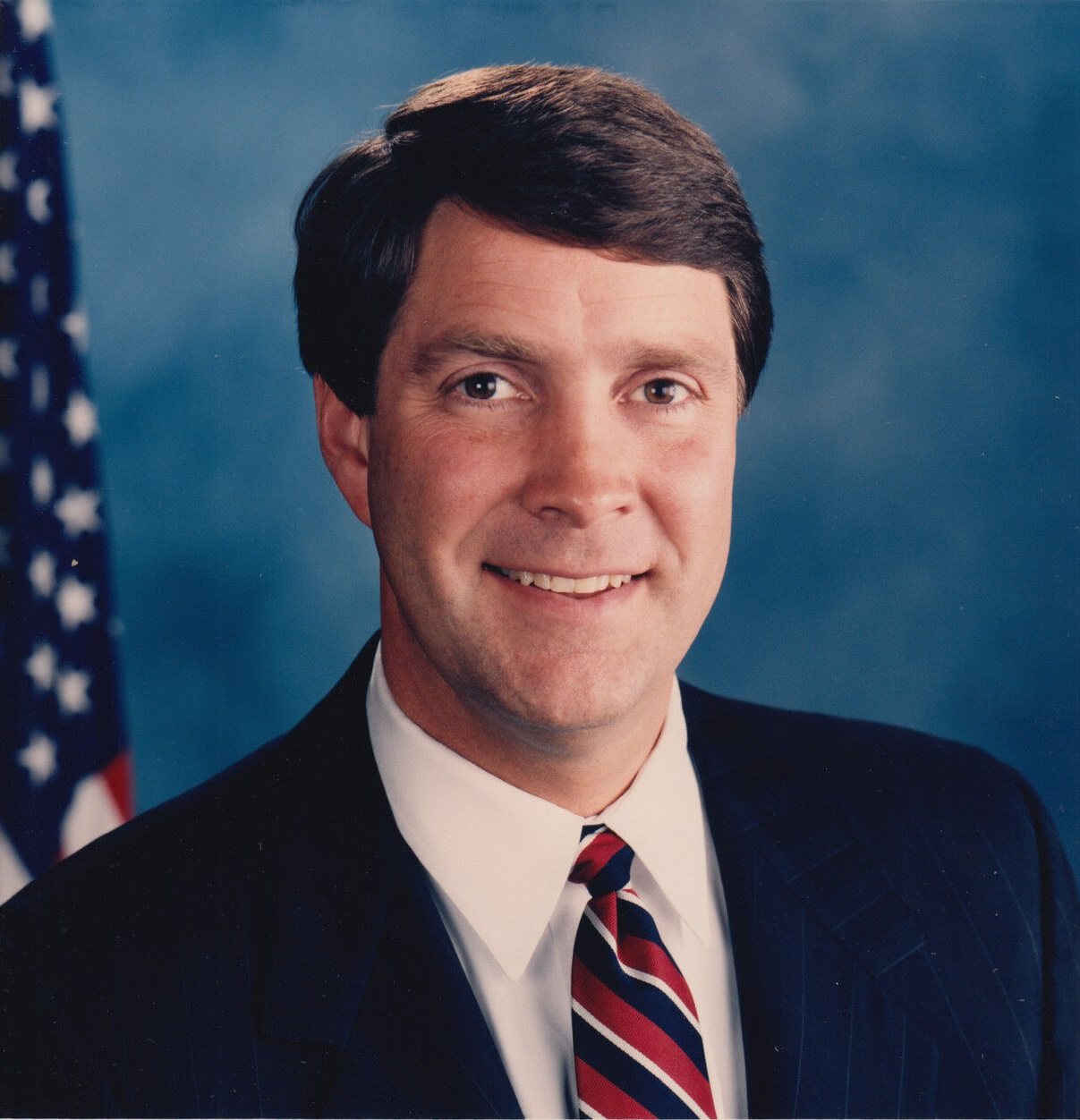
Senate photograph, circa 1990s.

During the 1994 election, Frist promised not to serve for more than two terms, a promise he honored.

Frist accused his 1994 opponent, incumbent senator Jim Sasser, of "sending Tennessee money to Washington, DC", and said, "While I've been transplanting lungs and hearts to heal Tennesseans, Jim Sasser has been transplanting Tennesseans' wallets to Washington, home of Marion Barry." During the campaign he also criticized Sasser for trying to become Senate Majority Leader, claiming that his opponent would be spending more time taking care of Senate business than Tennessee business. Frist won the election, defeating Sasser by 211,062 votes in the 1994 Republican sweep of both houses of Congress, thus becoming the first doctor in the Senate since June 17, 1938, when Royal S. Copeland died.

In his 2000 reelection campaign, Frist easily won with 66 percent of the vote. He received the largest vote total ever by a statewide candidate. Frist's 2000 campaign organization was later fined by the Federal Election Commission for failing to disclose a $1.44 million loan taken out jointly with the 1994 campaign organization. Frist paid a civil fine of $11,000 in a settlement with the FEC.

Frist supported the Iraq war while in the Senate; he supported the initial invasion as well as the war during the Iraqi Insurgency.

Frist first entered the national spotlight when two Capitol police officers were shot inside the United States Capitol by Russell Eugene Weston Jr. in 1998. Frist, the closest doctor, provided immediate medical attention (he was unable to save the two officers, but was able to save Weston). Frist said of that experience, "You’re trained to respond. … In moments like that, you are not a judge, not a jury, you are a physician. It was a tragic incident. I know almost all of the Capitol guards."

As the only physician in the Senate, Frist served as the congressional spokesman during the 2001 anthrax attacks. His book, When Every Moment Counts: What You Need to Know About Bioterrorism from the Senate's Only Doctor, was published following the attacks and provides a question-and-answer format with timely information on responding to biological agents like anthrax.

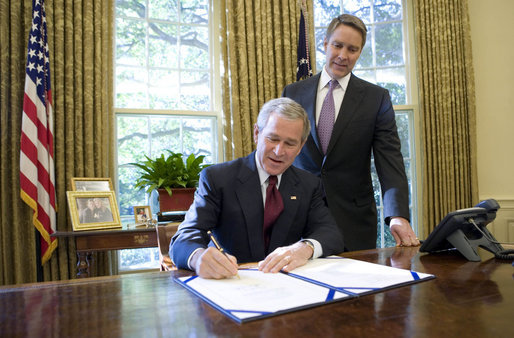
Frist looks on as President George W. Bush signs the North Korea Nonproliferation Act of 2006 (Pub. L. 109–353 (text) (PDF)) into law.

Over the course of his 12 years in the Senate, his committee assignments included: Committee on Finance, Committee on Health, Education, and Pensions, Committee on Rules and Administration, Committee on Banking, Housing and Urban Affairs, Committee on Labor and Human Resources, Committee on Commerce, Science and Transportation, Committee on Foreign Relations, Committee on Small Business, and Committee on the Budget.

He served as chairman of the Subcommittee on Disability Policy, Ranking Member of the Subcommittee on African Affairs, Ranking Member of the Subcommittee on Public Health and Safety, chairman of the Subcommittee on Science, Technology and Space, and chairman of the Budget Committee Task Force on Education.

As the chairman of the National Republican Senatorial Committee, he helped Republicans win back the Senate in the 2002 midterm election. His committee collected $66.4 million for 2001–2002, 50% more than the previous year.

=== Senate majority leader (2003–2007) ===
On December 23, 2002, Frist was elected Senate majority leader. He became the third-youngest Senate Majority Leader in U.S. history, and had served fewer total years in Congress than any person previously chosen to lead that body. In his 2005 book, Herding Cats, A Lifetime in Politics, Frist's predecessor, Trent Lott, accused Frist of conspiring to push Lott out of the Senate majority leader post, a charge Frist denied.

==== Legislative accomplishments ====
In the 2003 legislative session, Frist enjoyed many successes. He was able to push many initiatives through to fruition, including the Bush administration's third major tax cut and the Medicare Modernization Act that established Medicare Part D (the prescription drug benefit for seniors) and the modern-day Medicare Advantage program. He also was instrumental in developing and then passing the President's Emergency Plan for AIDS Relief (PEPFAR), the historic and unprecedented funding commitment to fight AIDS that has saved the lives of 25 million people globally. Motivated to address the AIDS epidemic following his medical mission trips to sub-Saharan Africa, Frist laid the initial groundwork for PEPFAR with legislation he drafted with then-Senator John Kerry (D-MA). When President Bush made the PEPFAR program a priority of his 2003 agenda, Frist built a bipartisan coalition to secure the legislation's rapid passage.

Frist continued to support global health investments during his time as majority leader, and helped shepherd the enactment of the senator Paul Simon Water for the Poor Act of 2005, which made the provision of safe water, sanitation and hygiene (WASH) an objective of U.S. foreign assistance, recognizing a lack of clean water and sanitation as the leading cause of preventable death in the developing world.

Following the 2001 anthrax attacks and 2004 ricin attacks, Frist led the Senate to pass the Project BioShield Act, a $5.6 billion research effort to develop and acquire medical vaccines and treatments to protect against chemical, biological, radiological, and nuclear (CBRN) attacks. In December 2006, during Frist's final month as Senate Majority Leader, Congress passed the Biomedical Advanced Research and Development Authority (BARDA), as a part of the Pandemic and All-Hazards Preparedness Act, to strengthen BioShield by creating a dedicated agency within the U.S. Department of Health and Human Services focused on the procurement and development of CBRN medical countermeasures. The mechanisms and agencies established by this legislation became vital 14 years later during the COVID-19 pandemic.

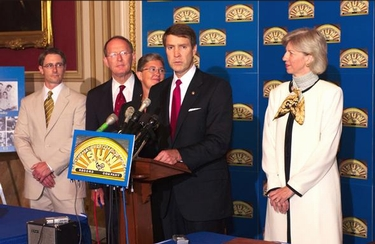
Frist with Sen. Lamar Alexander and Interior Secretary Gale Norton

==== Stem cells ====
In 2001, President George W. Bush prohibited federal funding of most human embryonic cell research, limiting federal funding only to cell lines from embryos before the date of his announcement. At the time there were believed to be 78 viable lines. Frist supported the President in 2001, but as time progressed, the stem cell lines became less stable and by 2005 only 22 viable lines remained. In 2001, Frist had laid out 10 principles that guided his views on stem cells, which he restated on the Senate floor in 2006. He said, "President Bush and I do not differ about the need for strong guidelines governing stem cell research. His policy was generally consistent with the principles I set forth a month before his announcement back in 2001. However, as science has progressed over the last 5 years, we have learned that fewer than the anticipated number of cell lines have proved suitable for research, and I think the limit on cell lines available for federally funded research is too restrictive." Frist led the Senate to pass on July 18, 2006 the Stem Cell Research Enhancement Act (H.R. 810) which would have expanded federal funding for stem cell research to include stem cells derived from embryos created for but not used in fertilization. The legislation drew criticism from James Dobson and other Christians, but garnered praise from former First Lady Nancy Reagan. H.R. 810 was vetoed by President Bush and Congress failed to override the veto.

==== Unlawful Internet Gambling Enforcement Act (UIGEA) ====
Just before Congress adjourned for the 2006 elections, in what politicos call a "midnight drop", Frist inserted the Unlawful Internet Gambling Enforcement Act (UIGEA) clauses into the larger, unrelated Security and Accountability for Every Port (SAFE) Act. The SAFE Act itself was a late "must pass" bill designed to safeguard ports from terrorist infiltration. The UIGEA became the basis for the April 15, 2011, US Department of Justice government crackdown and domain name seizure of three of the world's top online poker sites, dubbed "black Friday" in the poker community. The DOJ Office of Legal Counsel subsequently issued an opinion in September 2011, stating that the UIGEA applies only to betting on sporting events and contests and not to other types of online gambling.

==== Schiavo case ====
In the case of Terri Schiavo, a brain-damaged woman whose husband wanted to remove her gastric feeding tube, Frist opposed the removal. In a 2005 speech delivered on the Senate Floor, he questioned the diagnosis of Schiavo's doctors of Schiavo being in a persistent vegetative state (PVS): "I question it based on a review of the video footage which I spent an hour or so looking at last night in my office." After her death, the autopsy showed signs of long-term and irreversible damage to a brain consistent with PVS. Frist defended his actions after the autopsy.

==== Campaigns and elections ====
In a prominent and nationally broadcast speech at the 2004 Republican National Convention, Frist highlighted his background as a doctor and focused on several issues related to health care. He spoke in favor of the recently passed Medicare prescription drug benefit and the passage of legislation providing for health savings accounts.

In an impassioned argument for medical malpractice tort reform, Frist called personal injury trial lawyers "predators": "We must stop them from twisting American medicine into a litigation lottery where they hit the jackpot and every patient ends up paying." Frist has been an advocate for imposing caps on the amount of money courts can award plaintiffs for noneconomic damages in medical malpractice cases.

During the 2004 election season, Frist employed the unprecedented political tactic of going to the home state of the opposition party's minority leader, Democrat Tom Daschle of South Dakota. Daschle's Republican opponent, John Thune, defeated Daschle. After Frist too left the senate, he and Daschle would later work together at the Bipartisan Policy Center and have spoken together frequently at healthcare conventions and events and written numerous joint op-eds on policy issues of bipartisan agreement.

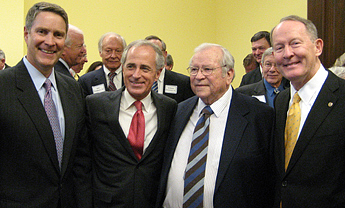
Frist at the inauguration of his successor Bob Corker (second left). Along with Tennessee's former senator Howard Baker (second right), and senior senator Lamar Alexander (far right).

Frist pledged to leave the Senate after two terms in 2006 and did not run for reelection. He campaigned heavily for Republican candidate Bob Corker, who won the race to succeed him by a small margin over Congressman Harold Ford Jr. in the general election.

== Post-Senate career ==
=== Political involvement ===
Frist was mentioned as a potential 2008 Republican presidential candidate and as a potential 2010 Republican candidate for Governor of Tennessee. Ultimately, he did not run for either office.

In 2009, Frist stated that he would have broken with his party by voting in favor of the Patient Protection and Affordable Care Act, which was unanimously opposed by Republicans. In January 2011, after the Republicans regained a majority in the House, Frist called on them not to attempt to repeal the health care law.

=== Business career ===
In 2008, he became a partner in Chicago-based Cressey & Co., investing in the nation's health care market. Today, he serves as special partner and chairman of the Executives Council at Cressey.

In 2013, Frist partnered with Brad Smith to start Aspire Health, which grew to be the largest non-hospice community-based palliative care company in the U.S. before it was acquired by Anthem in 2018. The care model was inspired in part by the team-based approach Frist had used in caring for patients awaiting transplants.

In 2015, Frist co-founded Frist Cressey Ventures, a Nashville-based venture capital firm focused on partnering with early-stage healthcare companies. He is an active partner in the firm today.

Frist also serves as board chair of Monogram Health, a value-based specialty provider of in-home evidence-based care and benefit management services for patients living with polychronic conditions, including chronic kidney and end-stage renal disease. Based in Nashville, Tennessee, and privately held by Frist Cressey Ventures and other leading strategic and financial investors, Monogram Health provides care for patients across 34 states and all insurance products.

=== Philanthropy ===
In 2009, Frist launched a statewide education reform nonprofit organization targeting K-12 education called SCORE (State Collaborative on Reforming Education). The organization's mission is to "collaboratively support Tennessee's work to prepare students for college and the workforce." Frist has served as chairman of SCORE's board of directors. As part of SCORE's work, Frist annually presents the State of Education in Tennessee report, a comprehensive look at the state's efforts to improve public education. In 2013, Frist voiced support for higher academic standards in grades K-12, reauthorization of the Elementary and Secondary Education Act, and improving efforts to identify, foster, and reward effective teaching.

In 2010, Frist served on the six-person board of the Clinton Bush Haiti Fund, which had raised $66 million for immediate earthquake relief and long-term recovery efforts in the Caribbean country.

Frist also founded and chairs Hope Through Healing Hands, a global health non-profit, as well as community health collaborative NashvilleHealth. In 2019 NashvilleHealth completed, in partnership with the Nashville Metro Public Health Department, the first community health and well-being survey of Nashville/Davidson County residents in nearly 20 years. The organization also led a review of Nashville's response to the COVID-19 pandemic, detailing recommendations to improve future crisis response in a report, Strategies for Future Preparedness: Examining the Impact of COVID-19 in Nashville.

=== Board service ===
Frist has served on numerous public, private, and non-profit boards. He currently serves as chairman of the Global Board of the Nature Conservancy, a three-year term that began in October 2022, and has been a member of the board since June 2015, previously as vice-chair. He has also served on the non-profit boards of the Robert Wood Johnson Foundation (2013–2023), and previously spent 10 years on the board of the Kaiser Family Foundation.

Other current board services includes: Aegis Sciences Corporation, Devoted Health, Digital Diagnostics, MDsave, Monogram Health, OneOncology, Select Medical, and Teladoc. Prior service includes: Accolade, URS Corp., and AECOM.

He has been a member of the Harvard Medical School Department of Global Health and Social Medicine Advisory Council since 2010, and previously chaired the Harvard Medical School's Board of Fellows and served on Princeton University's board of trustees for fifteen years (1974–1978 and 1991–2001).

Frist has held numerous roles with the Smithsonian Institution, including serving on its board of regents (1997–2007). Congress established the Smithsonian in 1846 as "an establishment for the increase and diffusion of knowledge," and vested responsibility for the administration of the Smithsonian in a board of regents, consisting of the chief justice of the United States, the vice president of the United States, three members of the United States Senate, three members of the United States House of Representatives, and nine citizens. Frist later served on the advisory board of the Smithsonian's National Museum of the American Indian.

From 2007 to 2010 he served on the board of the Millennium Challenge Corporation, a government corporation established in 2004 to fight global poverty.

From 2014 to 2016, Frist served on the board of Theranos, the blood testing company founded by Elizabeth Holmes, who was later convicted of fraud. In 2015, Frist was added to a newly-created Medical Advisory Board. Frist was noted as the only board member with medical or scientific training, though he had not practiced medicine for decades at the time, and was thus of particular interest to investigators after the public collapse of Theranos. He was deposed during legal proceedings.

=== Other endeavors ===
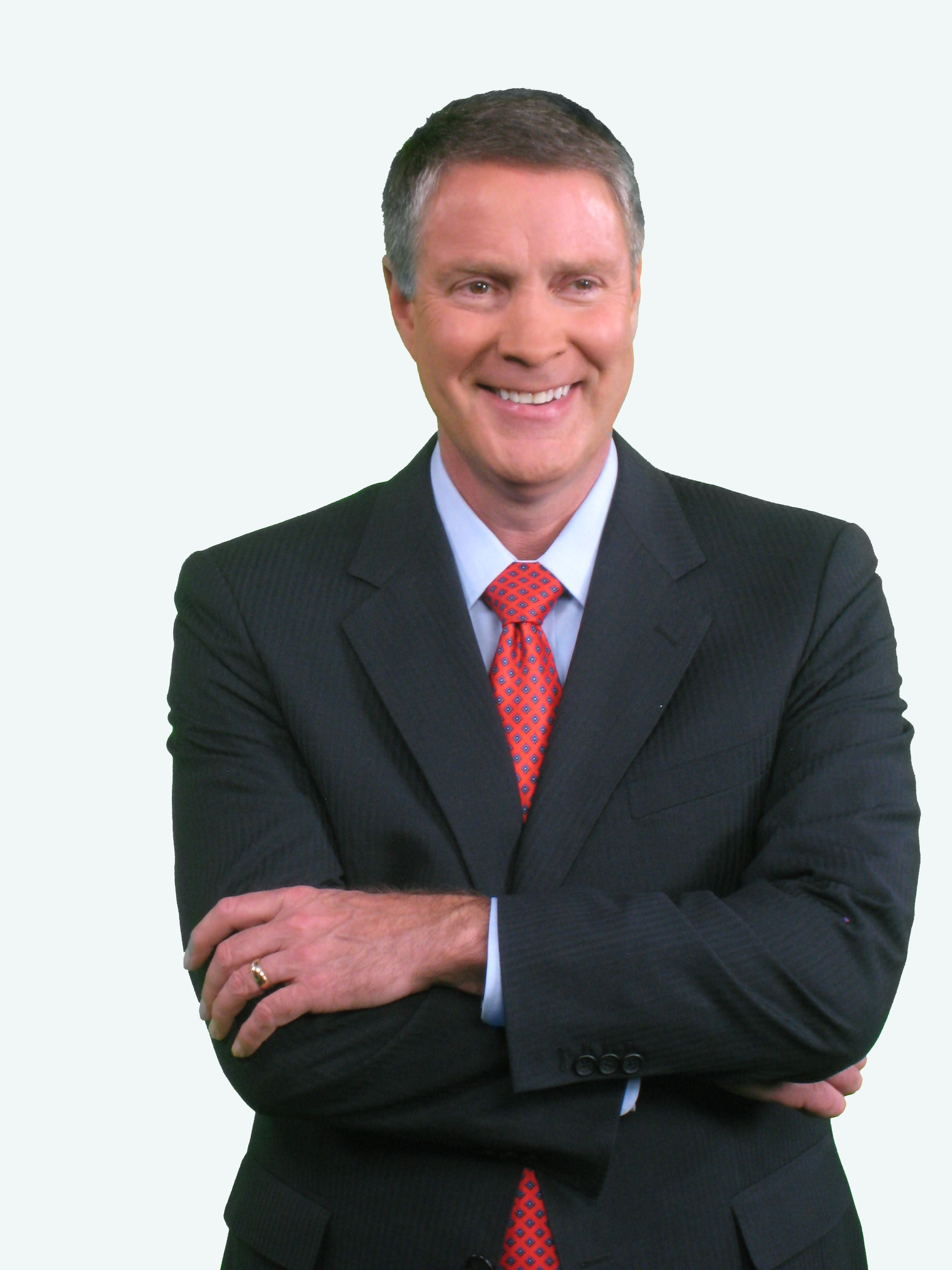
Frist in 2009

After leaving the U.S. Senate, Frist taught at Princeton and Vanderbilt. From 2007- 2008 Frist served as the Frederick H. Schultz Class of 1951 Visiting professor of International Economic Policy at Princeton's Woodrow Wilson School of Public and International Affairs, teaching with his longtime mentor, renowned healthcare economist Uwe Reinhardt. From 2009 – 2010, Frist taught as a Distinguished Professor at Vanderbilt University with Congressman Jim Cooper (D-TN).

Frist also became a co-chair of One Vote '08, an initiative of the ONE campaign, with former Senate majority leader Tom Daschle (D-SD). According to OneVote.org, "One Vote '08 is an unprecedented, non-partisan campaign to make global health and extreme poverty foreign policy priorities in the 2008 presidential election." Frist traveled to Africa for the ONE campaign in July 2008.

Since 2011, Frist has served as a senior fellow at the Bipartisan Policy Center, and is co-chair of the organization's Health Project with former Senate majority leader Tom Daschle.

Frist is a trained pilot, a skill he used to annually travel to all 95 Tennessee counties while campaigning and in office.

An active runner while in the Senate, Frist completed seven marathons from 1998 – 2001.

== Books ==
In June 1989, Frist published his first book, Transplant: A Heart Surgeon's Account of the Life-And-Death Dramas of the New Medicine, in which he wrote, "A doctor is a man whose job justifies everything ... Life [is] a gift, not an inalienable right."

With J. H. Helderman, he edited "Grand Rounds in Transplantation" in 1995, which described case studies in kidney, heart, lung, liver, and bone marrow transplantation drawn from Vanderbilt's case load.

In October 1999, Frist co-authored Tennessee Senators, 1911–2001: Portraits of Leadership in a Century of Change with J. Lee Annis Jr.

In March 2002, Frist published, When Every Moment Counts: What You Need to Know About Bioterrorism from the Senate's Only Doctor, sharing practical guidance following the 2001 anthrax attacks on how to stay safe in the event of a bioterrorism attack.

In 2003, Frist and co-author Shirley Wilson released the book, Good People Beget Good People: A Genealogy of the Frist Family.

In October 2009, Frist published A Heart to Serve: The Passion to Bring Health, Hope, and Healing. The book details his family legacy, his experiences as a heart and lung transplant surgeon and a U.S. Senator, and covers several of his medical mission trips in Africa, the process to enact PEPFAR, the 2001 anthrax attacks and SARS, the Medicare Modernization Act, and the 1998 Capitol shooting where he administered care.

He coedited with Manish Sethi An Introduction to Health Policy in 2013.

== Personal life ==
In 1981, Frist married Karyn McLaughlin. They had three sons: Harrison, Jonathan, and Bryan. The Frist family were members of the National Presbyterian Church in Washington, D.C. The Frists were divorced in December 2012.

On May 29, 2015, Frist married Tracy Lynne Roberts (b. April 14, 1962). The couple resides in Franklin, Tennessee.

=== Finances ===
As of 2005, Frist had a fortune in the millions of dollars, most of it the result of his ownership of stock in Hospital Corporation of America, the for-profit hospital chain founded by his brother and father. Frist's 2005 financial disclosure form listed blind trusts valued between $15 million and $45 million.

Members of the Frist family have been major donors to Princeton University, pledging a reported $25 million in 1997 for the construction of the Frist Campus Center.

Bill and Karyn Frist were the sole trustees in charge of a family foundation bearing the senator's name which had more than $2 million in assets in 2004. He and his siblings were vice presidents of another charitable foundation bearing their parents' names. The status of Frist's blind trust, and subsequent statements about it and activities within it, led to an SEC investigation. He was questioned in 2005 by the Securities and Exchange Commission (SEC) about stock sales allegedly based on inside information. The investigation was closed after 18 months with no charges were filed. Frist said in a statement, "I've always conducted myself according to the highest ethical standards in both my personal and public life, and my family and I are pleased that this matter has been resolved."

== Recognition ==
Frist was named one of the 100 Most Powerful People in Healthcare by Modern Healthcare in 2002, 2003 and 2004. He was also named to The Time 100: The 2005 list of the world's most influential people by Time Magazine.

In 2001, he received the Golden Plate Award of the American Academy of Achievement.

In 2003, Frist received Princeton University's Woodrow Wilson Award, which is conferred annually upon an alumnus or alumna of the undergraduate college whose achievements exemplify Woodrow Wilson's memorable phrase, "Princeton in the nation’s service."

In 2011, he received the Al Ueltschi Award for Humanitarian Leadership in recognition of his life-saving efforts worldwide, and the importance of business aviation to those endeavors.

Between 1997 and 2006, Frist received honorary degrees from five historically black colleges and universities, including Fisk University, Howard University, LeMoyne-Owen College, Meharry Medical College, and the Morehouse School of Medicine.

== Electoral history ==
1994 United States Senate election in Tennessee
Party	Candidate	Votes	%	±%
Republican	Bill Frist	834,226	56.35	+21
Democratic	Jim Sasser (incumbent)	623,164	42.10	−22.99
Republican gain from Democratic		Swing		

2000 United States Senate election in Tennessee
Party	Candidate	Votes	%	±%
Republican	Bill Frist (incumbent)	1,255,444	65.10	+8.75
Democratic	Jeff Clark	621,152	32.21	−10
Republican hold		Swing		

Party political offices
Preceded by Bill Anderson	Republican nominee for U.S. Senator from Tennessee (Class 1); 1994, 2000	Succeeded by Bob Corker
Preceded by Jennifer Dunn; Steve Largent	Response to the State of the Union address 2000; Served alongside: Susan Collins	Succeeded by Tom Daschle; Dick Gephardt
Preceded by Mitch McConnell	Chair of the National Republican Senatorial Committee; 2001–2003	Succeeded by George Allen
Preceded by Trent Lott	Senate Republican Leader; 2003–2007	Succeeded by Mitch McConnell
U.S. Senate
Preceded by Jim Sasser	U.S. Senator (Class 1) from Tennessee; 1995–2007; Served alongside: Fred Thompson, Lamar Alexander	Succeeded by Bob Corker
Preceded by Tom Daschle	Senate Majority Leader; 2003–2007	Succeeded by Harry Reid
U.S. order of precedence (ceremonial)
Preceded by Tom Daschle as Former U.S. Senate Majority Leader	Order of precedence of the United States as Former U.S. Senate Majority Leader	Succeeded by Don Nickles as Former U.S. Senate Majority Whip
