= Polecat, Tennessee =

- Unincorporated community
- Location within Tennessee Location within the United States
- Coordinates: 35°57′24″N 87°52′50″W
- Country: United States
- State: Tennessee
- County: Humphreys
- Elevation: 397 ft (121 m)
- Time zone: UTC-6 (Central (CST))
  - Summer (DST): UTC-5 (CDT)
- Area code: 931
- GNIS feature ID: 1315750

Polecat is an unincorporated community in Humphreys County, Tennessee, United States.
