= Hustburg =

Unincorporated community in Tennessee, US

- Unincorporated community
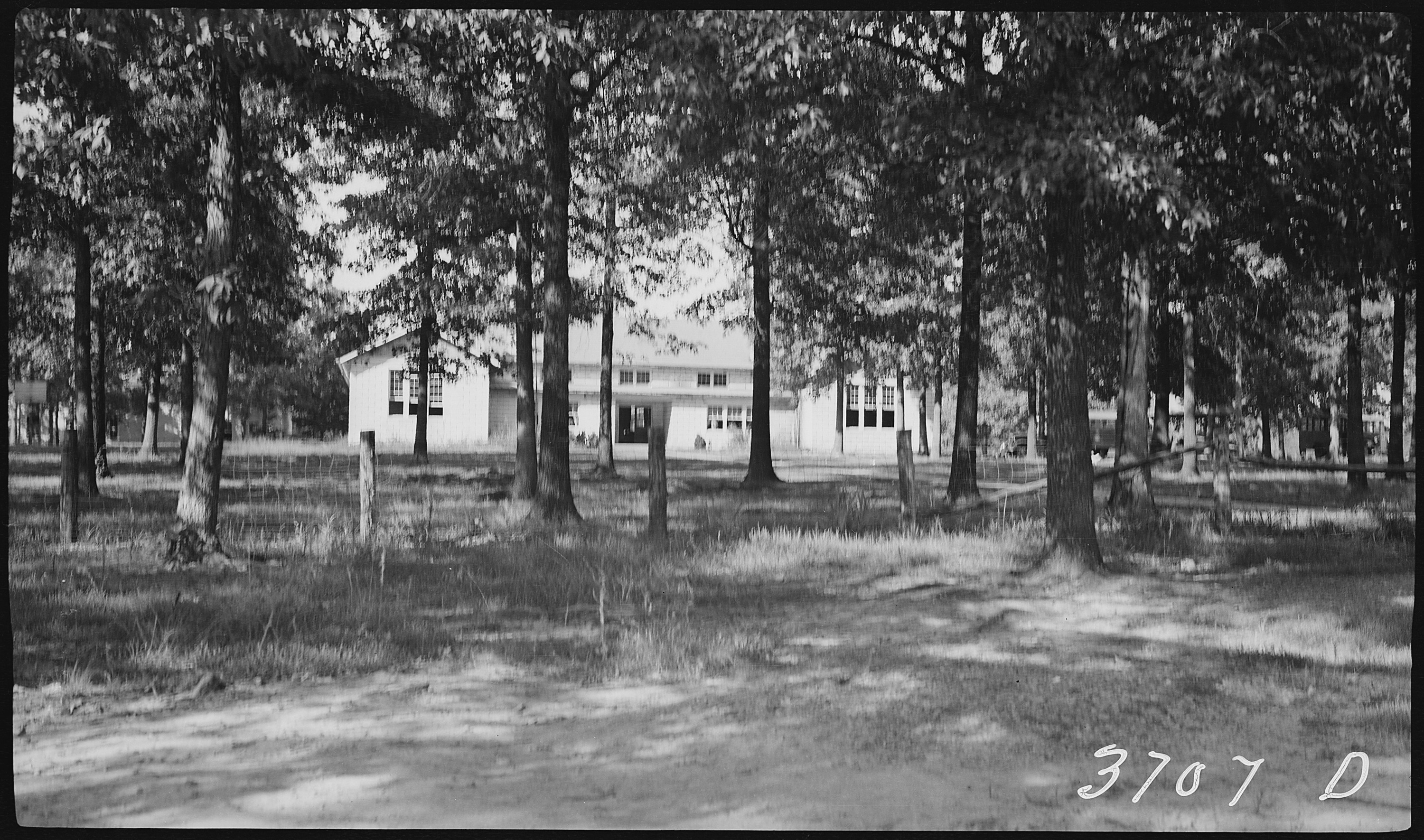
- Tennessee Valley Authority Information Office photo of a school in Hustburg (1939)

- Location within Tennessee
- Coordinates: 35°58′58″N 87°57′35″W
- Country: United States
- State: Tennessee
- County: Humphreys
- Time zone: UTC-6:00 (CST)
  - Summer (DST): UTC-5:00 (CDT)

Hustburg is an unincorporated community in Humphreys County, Tennessee. Hustburg Creek passes through the area.

== Overview ==
U.S. Senator from Arkansas Hattie Caraway grew up in Hustburg and attended its Ebenezer Church where she sang. She attended a one-room school house that may have been affiliated with the church before attending Dickson Normal School. More recent accounts state she went to "Ebenezer College" which seems a stretch.

Tribble High School served the community before it closed. Hustburg has had an Ebenezer Methodist Church.

In 1939 TVA released a report on the "readjustment problem" in Hustburg.

Hustburg is near where the Duck River meets the Tennessee River. A study using mosquito traps included Hustburg. Corn has been grown in the area known for its alluvial soil and as part of what's known as the "Big Bottom".

== See also ==
- New Johnsonville
