= Buffalo, Humphreys County, Tennessee =

- Unincorporated community
- Location within Tennessee Location within the United States
- Coordinates: 35°53′08″N 87°48′24″W
- Country: United States
- State: Tennessee
- County: Humphreys
- Elevation: 453 ft (138 m)
- Time zone: UTC-6 (Central (CST))
  - Summer (DST): UTC-5 (CDT)
- Area code: 931
- GNIS feature ID: 1314764

Buffalo is an unincorporated community in Humphreys County, Tennessee, United States. The business part of the community is located on State Route 13 where it crosses Interstate 40. The older rural location was about a mile northwest of the current business area. It also a part of Hurricane Mills' zip code, 37078.
