= Cedar Grove, Humphreys County, Tennessee =

- Unincorporated community
- Location within Tennessee Location within the United States
- Coordinates: 35°56′46″N 87°48′39″W
- Country: United States
- State: Tennessee
- County: Humphreys
- Elevation: 413 ft (126 m)
- Time zone: UTC-6 (Central (CST))
  - Summer (DST): UTC-5 (CDT)
- Area code: 931
- GNIS feature ID: 1314809

Cedar Grove is an unincorporated community in Humphreys County, Tennessee, United States. Cedar Grove is located near the Duck River 9.5 miles (15.3 km) south of Waverly.
