= Waverly Central High School =

Location
- 1325 Highway 70 West; Waverly, Tennessee; United States; 36°04′44″N 87°51′09″W

Information
- Type: Public
- School district: Humphreys County School System
- NCES School ID: 470198000642
- Principal: Kenneth Crowell
- Faculty: 37.20 (on FTE basis)
- Grades: 9–12
- Enrollment: 503 (2022–23)
- Student to teacher ratio: 13.52
- Colors: Blue and white
- Mascot: Wavo the Tiger
- Nickname: Tigers
- Website: wchs.hcss.org

Waverly Central High School is a senior high school in Waverly, Tennessee, United States. It is managed as part of the Humphreys County School System. The school educates in grades 9–12. For the school year 2019–20, the student population stood at 557.

== Sports ==
Waverly High is home of the Waverly Tigers and Tigerettes. The sports program includes basketball, volleyball, softball, baseball, football, track, soccer, tennis, golf and marching band, all of which are boys and girls. The teams play at the Ray Hampton Stadium, which was named after a former coach.
