= MDsave =

Healthcare ecommerce company

MDsave is a healthcare ecommerce company co-located in Grover, Delaware, and San Francisco, California.

The company officially launched in 2013. MDSave connects uninsured patients, health savings account holders, and high deductible health insurance patients with medical providers who offer pre-negotiated savings on medical services.

== History ==
MDsave was founded in 2011 in Brentwood, Tennessee by Paul Ketchel, the current CEO. Paul Ketchel was formerly chief operating officer of Diagnostics Network Alliance and a director for American Capitol Group.

MDsave officially launched in 2013. They had raised more than $14 million from investors and earned $5 million in 2015, with investors including MTS Health Partners. By 2015, it was in place in 24 states. Through the company's website, patients can compare local prices for different medical procedures; choose the price and provider that work best for them; and pre-purchase a voucher that covers all expenses.

In August 2016, MDsave secured a $5 million investment from Cambia Health Solutions and was doing around 2,000 transactions per month.

In June 2018, MDsave began working with St. Cloud Regional Medical Center. At the end of 2018, MDsave had expanded to a network of more than 200 hospitals across 29 states.

In May 2019, Gwinnett Medical Center became the first Atlanta-area hospital to partner with MDsave.

In March 2020, MDsave announced the appointment of Greg Born, a former global strategy leader for Amazon, as the new company president and COO.

In September 2023, MDsave was acquired by Tendo for $150 million.

== Business model and services ==
MDsave offers medical providers a way to package their services into a single bundled procedure online, and offers consumers paying out of pocket a way to comparison shop different providers.

A patient searches for a treatment or procedure in a location, and MDsave returns a list of providers in that area with price, location and doctor's ratings. A patient purchases the bundled procedure, which includes all associated fees and services, using PayPal, a credit card or a financing plan online. The patient receives a voucher to present to the doctor's office at their first appointment. The providers get paid within four days, versus the average 60–90 days through insurance.

MDsave uses a patented technology that cross-references Medicare billing codes, procedural codes, and diagnosis codes to create an upfront price for the bundled services involved in a single treatment or procedure.

=== Healthcare cost & access ===
Through the MDsave marketplace, patients have access to a wide variety of medical procedures at up-front prices, along with simplified billing and educational resources. The prices posted on the site are pre-negotiated with individual doctors or hospitals, and include all costs associated with the procedure, including physician billing; patients do not receive another bill.

In November 2018, MDsave partnered with CareCredit, a health, wellness and personal care credit card offered by Synchrony Bank, to offer promotional financing for patients.

=== Automated episodic care bundling ===
MDsave works with providers to bundle complex medical procedures into a single upfront payment, which provides consumers with discounted out-of-pocket healthcare bills.

=== MDsave Plus ===
MDsave Plus is geared toward employers as a supplement to employee health benefits. MDsave negotiates prices with providers and then passes the savings along to employees, who can save up to 60% on their medical costs.

== Providers ==
MDsave works with hospital groups and ambulatory surgical centers. In 2016 it had a presence in 24 states and 120 markets, and was growing at a rate of 20% month over month. Providers in 2015 included Dignity Health, Catholic Health Initiatives, Community Health Systems, Tenet Healthcare and others.

== Board of directors ==
Board members include former Senate Majority Leader Dr. Bill Frist.
