= Hurricane Mills Rural Historic District =

Historic district in Tennessee, United States

- U.S. National Register of Historic Places
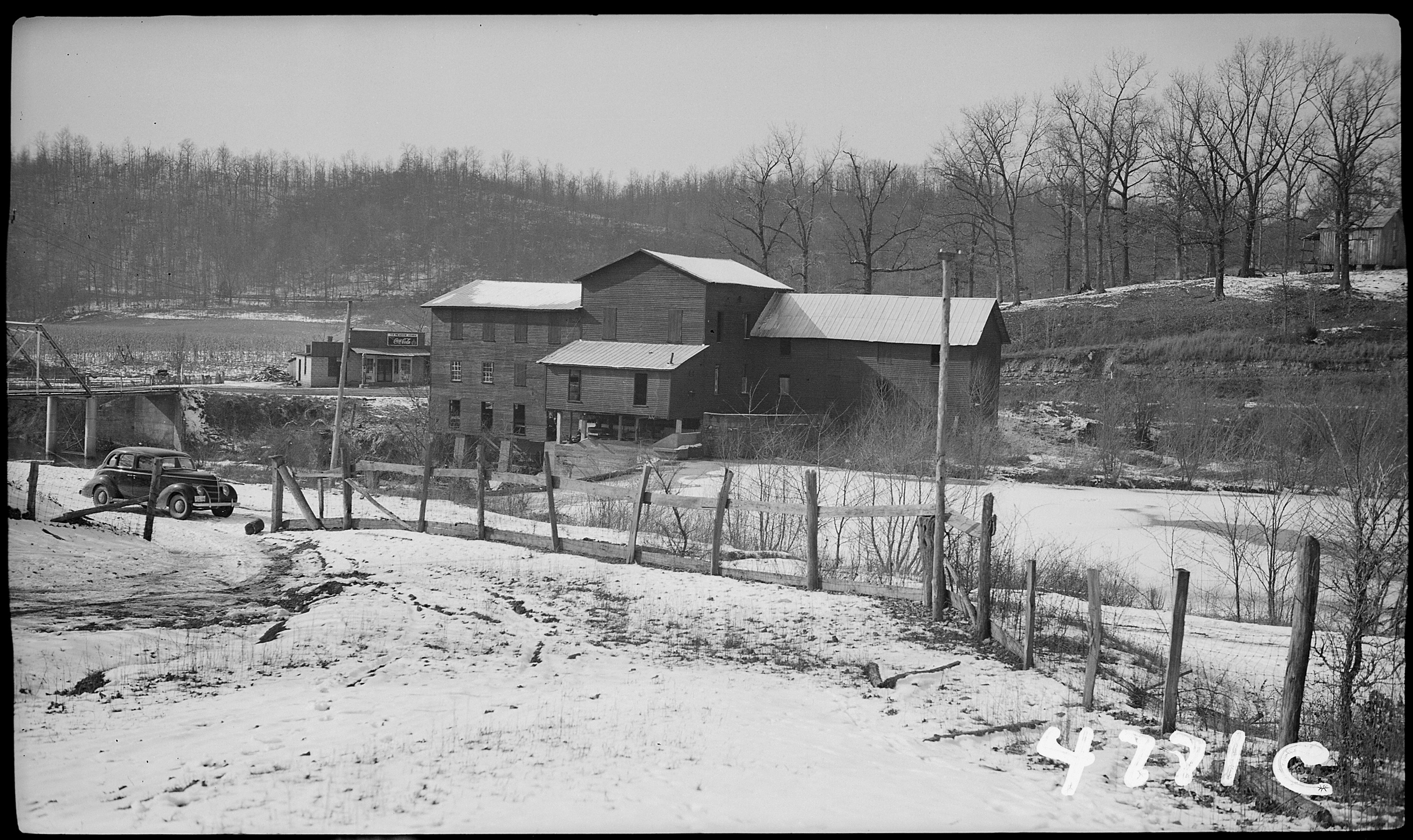
- Hurricane Mill in 1940

- Location within Tennessee
- Location: 44 Hurricane Mills Rd., Hurricane Mills, Tennessee
- Coordinates: 35°57′53″N 87°47′08″W
- Area: 300 acres (120 ha)
- Built by: Page, W.H.; McNabb, Ben T.
- Architectural style: Classical Revival, other
- NRHP reference No.: 99001449
- Added to NRHP: December 13, 1999

The Hurricane Mills Rural Historic District, in Hurricane Mills, Tennessee is a 300 acres (120 ha) historic district which was listed on the National Register of Historic Places in 1999. The listing included five contributing buildings, four contributing structures, and two contributing sites.

It is also known as Hurricane Forge and as the Loretta Lynn Ranch.

It includes:

- Hurricane Mill, built in stages from 1897 to c.1910
- Hurricane Creek Dam, in current concrete-faced form since about 1912, renovated to improve upon previous stone dam. The original wood and stone dam on the site was built c.1839.
- Hurricane Mills Bridge, a historic steel truss bridge built by the Nashville Bridge Company in 1911. It is 158.8 feet (48.4 m) long with a 100-foot long pin-connected Pratt through truss.
- Hurricane Mills Bridge, concrete, non-contributing
- a school
- Hillman-Anderson House, an I-house with porches and extensions built in stages during c.1876-c.1916
- Hurricane Mills General Merchandise Store & Post Office (1926)

The district was deemed notable as "a superb example of a small, crossroads community where agricultural, industrial, and commercial businesses thrived between the late-nineteenth and early-twentieth centuries. Since the late 1960s, this historic community had been the home of the late legendary country music entertainer Loretta Lynn and her family still resides there. Loretta Lynn's estate currently owns the entire historic district, with the exception of the public cemetery. The unincorporated Hurricane Mills community, including most of the resources in this historic district, has been used as a background set in numerous entertainment productions, including country music videos, television commercials and specials, and country music album covers. Hurricane Mills was also featured prominently in the Oscar-winning movie Coal Miner's Daughter (1980). Hurricane Mills has been a popular site for outdoor recreation for the local community since its establishment; however, this property, which is now known as the "Loretta Lynn Ranch & Family Campground," has become one of the most popular tourist destinations in Tennessee."
