= Must pass bill =

A must pass bill is a measure, considered vitally important, that must be passed and enacted by the United States Congress (e.g. funding for a function of government). Because of the time-sensitive nature of these bills, they are often amended with policy provisos, or 'riders', unrelated to the principal function of the bill itself. These riders can become law given the president's lack of line-item veto power.

These measures can also be exploited by the executive branch as was the case with former President Trump's border wall funding. The President claimed he would veto a spending bill that did not include $5.7 billion in border wall funding. The inability of the United States Congress to organize a bill that would have passed both chambers, with President Trump's requirements, resulted in a 35-day federal government shutdown between 2018 and 2019. In this case, the policy rider actually became a so-called poison pill as the added legislation was so controversial that it severely limited the possibility of the bill passing.

Another example of a must pass bill is legislation that raises the federal government's borrowing limit, known as the debt ceiling. Without passage, the federal government would no longer be able to borrow money to pay its bills, which experts conclude would have damaging effects on the global economy.
