= Humphreys County, Tennessee =

County in Tennessee, United States

- County
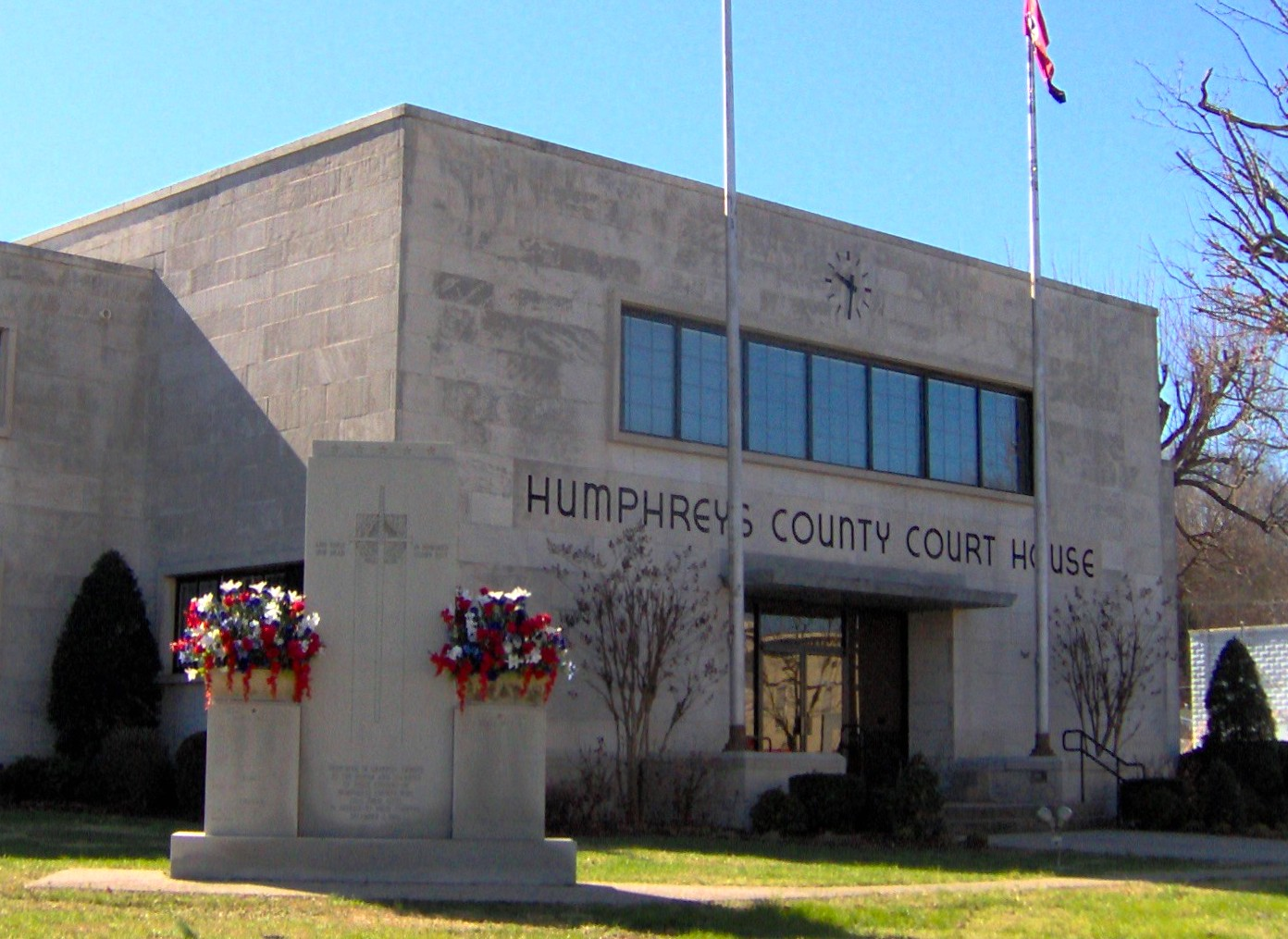
- Humphreys County Courthouse in Waverly

- Location within the U.S. state of Tennessee
- Coordinates: 36°02′N 87°46′W
- Country: United States
- State: Tennessee
- Founded: 1809
- Named for: Parry Wayne Humphreys
- Seat: Waverly
- Largest city: Waverly

Area
  - Total: 557 sq mi (1,440 km^{2})
  - Land: 531 sq mi (1,380 km^{2})
  - Water: 26 sq mi (67 km^{2}) 4.6%

Population (2020)
  - Total: 18,990
  - Estimate (2025): 19,646 ▲
  - Density: 34/sq mi (13/km^{2})
- Time zone: UTC−6 (Central)
  - Summer (DST): UTC−5 (CDT)
- Congressional district: 7th
- Website: www.humphreyscountytn.gov

Humphreys County is a county located in the western part of Middle Tennessee, in the U.S. state of Tennessee. As of the 2020 census, the population was 18,990. Its county seat is Waverly.

The county is named after American jurist and politician Parry Wayne Humphreys. It was established in 1809 from the southern portion of Stewart County.

== History ==
Humphreys County was established in 1809 from parts of Stewart County, and named for Parry Wayne Humphreys, a young Justice of the State Supreme Court, who was later elected as US Congressman from this area. The county seat was initially located at Reynoldsburg, near the mouth of Dry Creek. When the western half of the county was taken to form Benton County to the west in 1835, the seat of Humphreys was newly designated as Waverly, a town that was more centrally located in the redefined jurisdiction.

During the Civil War, the Battle of Johnsonville was fought for two days in the western half of the county in November 1864. The remnants of the battle site are preserved and interpreted at Johnsonville State Historic Park. But much of the battlefield has been submerged by Kentucky Lake, created by dams on the Tennessee River for flood control.

Since the mid-20th century, this area developed increasing ties with the major city of Nashville. Agricultural areas have been developed for residential communities and suburban businesses. As Nashville and the region have prospered, businesses and supporting services have also developed in this county.

=== 21st century ===
On the morning of August 21, 2021, storms riding along a stationary front in western Middle Tennessee produced widespread flash flooding across the counties of Stewart, Houston, Dickson, Hickman, and Humphreys. Especially hard hit were the towns of McEwen and Waverly, where many homes and businesses were destroyed by floodwaters along Trace Creek. Twenty people were killed as a result of the flooding throughout the county.

== Geography ==
According to the U.S. Census Bureau, the county has a total area of 557 square miles (1,440 km^{2}), of which 531 square miles (1,380 km^{2}) is land and 26 square miles (67 km^{2}) (4.6%) is water.

=== Adjacent counties ===
- Houston County (north)
- Dickson County (northeast)
- Hickman County (southeast)
- Perry County (south)
- Benton County (west)

=== National protected area ===
- Tennessee National Wildlife Refuge (part)

=== State protected area ===
- Johnsonville State Historic Park

== Demographics ==
Historical population
Census	Pop.	Note	%±
1810	1,511		—
1820	4,067		169.2%
1830	6,187		52.1%
1840	5,195		−16.0%
1850	6,422		23.6%
1860	9,096		41.6%
1870	9,326		2.5%
1880	11,379		22.0%
1890	11,720		3.0%
1900	13,398		14.3%
1910	13,908		3.8%
1920	13,482		−3.1%
1930	12,039		−10.7%
1940	12,421		3.2%
1950	11,030		−11.2%
1960	11,511		4.4%
1970	13,560		17.8%
1980	15,957		17.7%
1990	15,795		−1.0%
2000	17,929		13.5%
2010	18,538		3.4%
2020	18,990		2.4%
2025 (est.)	19,646	▲	3.5%
U.S. Decennial Census; 1790-1960 1900-1990; 1990-2000 2010-2014

=== Racial and ethnic composition ===
Humphreys County, Tennessee – Racial and ethnic composition Note: the US Census treats Hispanic/Latino as an ethnic category. This table excludes Latinos from the racial categories and assigns them to a separate category. Hispanics/Latinos may be of any race.
Race / ethnicity (NH = Non-Hispanic)	Pop 1980	Pop 1990	Pop 2000	Pop 2010	Pop 2020	% 1980	% 1990	% 2000	% 2010	% 2020
White alone (NH)	15,224	15,123	17,030	17,498	17,102	95.41%	95.75%	94.99%	94.39%	90.06%
Black or African American alone (NH)	629	550	522	455	494	3.94%	3.48%	2.91%	2.45%	2.60%
Native American or Alaska Native alone (NH)	11	26	43	65	43	0.07%	0.16%	0.24%	0.35%	0.23%
Asian alone (NH)	32	32	46	34	57	0.20%	0.20%	0.26%	0.18%	0.30%
Native Hawaiian or Pacific Islander alone (NH)	x	x	2	6	0	x	x	0.01%	0.03%	0.00%
Other race alone (NH)	0	1	2	13	74	0.00%	0.01%	0.01%	0.07%	0.39%
Mixed race or Multiracial (NH)	x	x	136	189	771	x	x	0.76%	1.02%	4.06%
Hispanic or Latino (any race)	61	63	148	278	449	0.38%	0.40%	0.83%	1.50%	2.36%
Total	15,957	15,795	17,929	18,538	18,990	100.00%	100.00%	100.00%	100.00%	100.00%

=== 2020 census ===
As of the 2020 census, the county had a population of 18,990. The median age was 43.1 years, with 22.8% of residents under the age of 18 and 20.2% aged 65 or older. For every 100 females there were 100.9 males, and for every 100 females age 18 and over there were 95.2 males age 18 and over.

There were 7,599 households in the county, of which 28.8% had children under the age of 18 living in them. Of all households, 49.3% were married-couple households, 18.7% were households with a male householder and no spouse or partner present, and 25.1% were households with a female householder and no spouse or partner present. About 27.2% of all households were made up of individuals and 13.4% had someone living alone who was 65 years of age or older.

There were 8,849 housing units, of which 14.1% were vacant. Among occupied housing units, 73.7% were owner-occupied and 26.3% were renter-occupied. The homeowner vacancy rate was 1.2% and the rental vacancy rate was 6.1%.

Less than 0.1% of residents lived in urban areas, while 100.0% lived in rural areas.

=== 2000 census ===
As of the census of 2000, there were 17,929 people, 7,238 households, and 5,146 families residing in the county. The population density was 33.7 people per square mile (13.0 people/km^{2}). There were 8,482 housing units at an average density of 15.9 units per square mile (6.1 units/km^{2}). The racial makeup of the county was 95.52% White, 2.94% Black or African American, 0.27% Native American, 0.26% Asian, 0.01% Pacific Islander, 0.16% from other races, and 0.85% from two or more races. 0.83% of the population were Hispanic or Latino of any race.

There were 7,238 households, out of which 30.30% had children under the age of 18 living with them, 57.30% were married couples living together, 10.20% had a female householder with no husband present, and 28.90% were non-families. 25.00% of all households were made up of individuals, and 10.60% had someone living alone who was 65 years of age or older. The average household size was 2.44 and the average family size was 2.90.

In the county, the population was spread out, with 23.90% under the age of 18, 7.60% from 18 to 24, 27.50% from 25 to 44, 26.20% from 45 to 64, and 14.80% who were 65 years of age or older. The median age was 39 years. For every 100 females there were 96.80 males. For every 100 females age 18 and over, there were 93.10 males.

The median income for a household in the county was $35,786, and the median income for a family was $42,129. Males had a median income of $31,657 versus $20,736 for females. The per capita income for the county was $17,757. About 7.60% of families and 10.80% of the population were below the poverty line, including 12.50% of those under age 18 and 13.70% of those age 65 or over.

== Communities ==
=== Cities ===
- McEwen
- New Johnsonville
- Waverly (county seat)

=== Unincorporated communities ===
- Bakerville
- Buffalo
- Cedar Grove
- Hurricane Mills
- Hustburg
- Polecat

== Politics ==
Like most other counties in Middle Tennessee, Humphreys is historically a Democratic stronghold: it voted Democrat in almost every US presidential election up until 2004, making exceptions for Independent segregationist George Wallace in 1968 and Republican landslide winner Richard Nixon four years later. However, like other rural Middle Tennessee counties, Humphreys is nowadays solid ground for the Republican Party, with the GOP margin of victory dramatically increasing in each presidential election since John McCain's narrow win in 2008.

United States presidential election results for Humphreys County, Tennessee
Year	Republican		Democratic		Third party(ies)	
Year	No.	%	No.	%	No.	%
1912	343	18.59%	1,283	69.54%	219	11.87%
1916	452	27.95%	1,148	71.00%	17	1.05%
1920	674	30.21%	1,534	68.76%	23	1.03%
1924	216	17.17%	1,005	79.89%	37	2.94%
1928	441	36.21%	771	63.30%	6	0.49%
1932	231	13.56%	1,455	85.44%	17	1.00%
1936	297	18.81%	1,279	81.00%	3	0.19%
1940	377	17.98%	1,717	81.88%	3	0.14%
1944	367	21.58%	1,327	78.01%	7	0.41%
1948	355	15.85%	1,327	59.24%	558	24.91%
1952	898	25.16%	2,670	74.81%	1	0.03%
1956	713	19.99%	2,841	79.67%	12	0.34%
1960	1,126	29.90%	2,592	68.83%	48	1.27%
1964	916	22.09%	3,230	77.91%	0	0.00%
1968	866	19.90%	1,391	31.96%	2,095	48.14%
1972	2,263	52.17%	1,973	45.48%	102	2.35%
1976	1,338	24.72%	4,021	74.28%	54	1.00%
1980	1,897	31.80%	3,974	66.61%	95	1.59%
1984	2,249	37.91%	3,668	61.82%	16	0.27%
1988	2,132	41.09%	3,037	58.54%	19	0.37%
1992	1,641	26.75%	3,875	63.16%	619	10.09%
1996	1,892	31.43%	3,675	61.05%	453	7.52%
2000	2,387	35.73%	4,205	62.94%	89	1.33%
2004	3,261	41.85%	4,485	57.55%	47	0.60%
2008	3,818	50.37%	3,600	47.49%	162	2.14%
2012	3,833	55.85%	2,905	42.33%	125	1.82%
2016	4,930	68.92%	1,967	27.50%	256	3.58%
2020	6,120	74.31%	2,017	24.49%	99	1.20%
2024	6,400	77.44%	1,767	21.38%	97	1.17%

== See also ==
- National Register of Historic Places listings in Humphreys County, Tennessee
