= Hurricane Mills, Tennessee =

- Unincorporated community
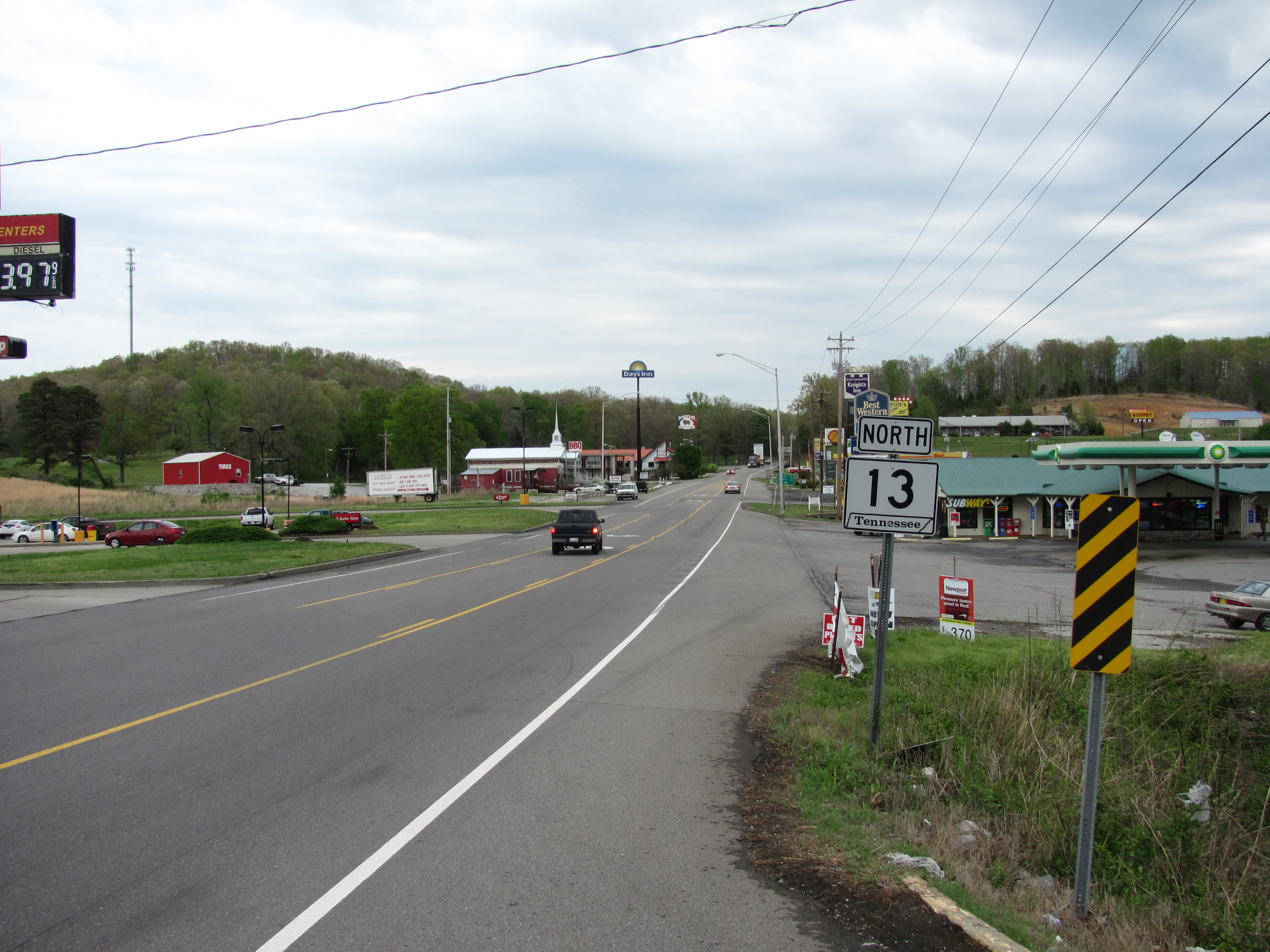
- Hurricane Mills, Tennessee

- Location within Tennessee Location within the United States
- Coordinates: 35°58′16″N 87°46′55″W
- Country: United States
- State: Tennessee
- County: Humphreys
- Elevation: 404 ft (123 m)
- Time zone: UTC-6 (Central (CST))
  - Summer (DST): UTC-5 (CDT)
- ZIP code: 37078
- Area code: 931
- GNIS feature ID: 1288832

Hurricane Mills is an unincorporated community in Humphreys County, Tennessee, United States. Its ZIP code is 37078.

The community is centered on Loretta Lynn's Ranch, which features a small number of businesses and a post office. Each year, the ranch hosts several concerts and motocross races, including the AMA Amateur National Motocross Championship, which it has hosted since 1982.

Most or all of the community is included in the Hurricane Mills Rural Historic District, listed on the National Register of Historic Places.

The Buffalo community, located at I-40 exit 143, is in Hurricane Mills' zip code and features several gas stations, restaurants and hotels.
