= 1912 Arkansas gubernatorial election =

- September 9, 1912
- Turnout: 10.78% ▲1.21
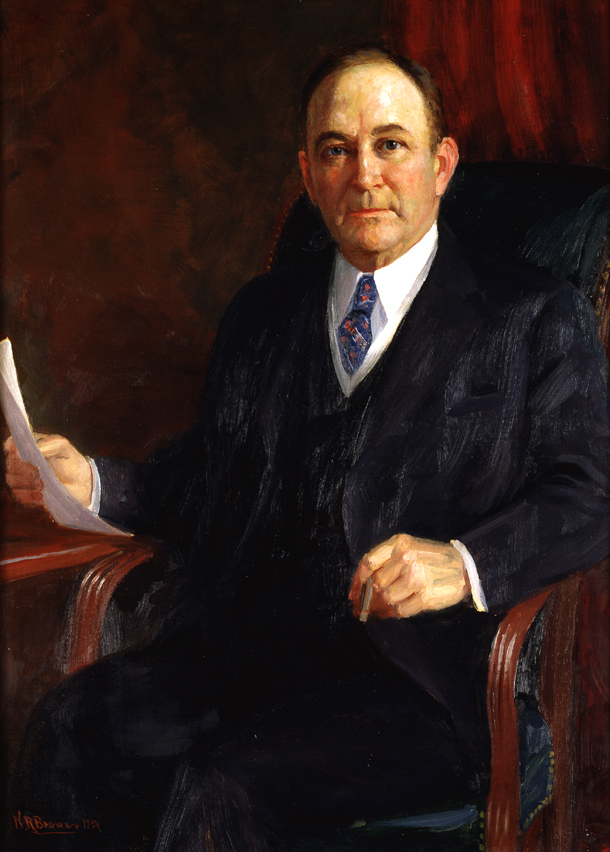

Nominee	Joseph Taylor Robinson	Andrew I. Roland	G. E. Mikel
Party	Democratic	Republican	Socialist
Popular vote	109,825	46,440	13,384
Percentage	64.74%	27.37%	7.89%
- County results Robinson: 40–50% 50–60% 60–70% 70–80% 80–90% Roland: 40–50% 50–60%
Governor before election
George Washington Donaghey
Democratic
Elected Governor
Joseph Taylor Robinson
Democratic

The 1912 Arkansas gubernatorial election took place on September 9, 1912.

Democratic Representative Joseph Taylor Robinson defeated the Republican and Socialist candidates Andrew I. Roland and G. E. Mikel with 64.74% of the vote.

Robinson would later leave his position after he was elected by the state legislature to fill the vacant Senate seat after Jefferson Davis died and would be succeeded by William Kavanaugh Oldham.

== Results ==
Arkansas gubernatorial election, 1912
Party	Candidate	Votes	%
Democratic	Joseph Taylor Robinson	109,825	64.74%
Republican	Andrew I. Roland	46,440	27.37%
Socialist	G. E. Mikel	13,384	7.89%
Total votes		169,649	100%
