= Eliza Jane Ashley =

American cook and author (1917–2020)

- Born: Eliza Jane Burnett; October 11, 1917; Pettus, Arkansas, U.S.
- Died: November 13, 2020 (aged 103); Norwalk, California, U.S.
- Other name: Eliza Jane Dodson
- Occupation: Chef
- Years active: 1956–1990
- Known for: Executive Chef at the Arkansas Governor's Mansion
- Spouses: Calvin Dodson (m. 1933–1960) Fred Ashley (m. 1960)

Eliza Jane Burnett Dodson Ashley, or best known as Liza Ashley, (October 11, 1917 – November 13, 2020) was an American cook and author. She was the executive chef at the Arkansas Governor's Mansion from 1956 to 1990. She authored the cookbook Thirty Years at the Mansion in 1985.

== Early life ==
Eliza Jane Burnett was born on the Oldham Plantation in Pettus, Arkansas on October 11, 1917. Her parents were Eliza Johnson Burnett and William Burnett. She was nicknamed "Liza" or "Janie" to differentiate her from her mother, of whom she shared a name.

Early in her life, Burnett became a Baptist. While in Pettus, she attended St. John Missionary Baptist Church. Her grandmother was the head cook at Oldham Plantation. She taught Burnett how to cook. When her grandmother died, Burnett became head cook. In 1933, she married Calvin Dodson. The couple left Oldham Plantation in 1942, moving to Little Rock, Arkansas. She had a child with Dodson in 1951. At one point during this time, she attended Pulaski Training School in McAlmont, Arkansas.

== Culinary career and life ==
In 1954, she began working at the Arkansas Governor's Mansion. She worked for then governor Francis Cherry and his family as a maid. The following year, Orval Faubus became governor. When the mansion's executive chef, Henry Scribner, had his days off, Dodson would serve as chef. Eventually, Alta Faubus, Arkansas' first lady, decided she wanted a woman chef and made Dodson executive chef.

Eventually, her marriage with Calvin Dodson ended. The couple divorced. In 1960, Burnett married Fred Ashley. When Winthrop Rockefeller became governor, Eliza Jane Ashley lost her position as executive chef. She was replaced with Rockefeller's personal chef. After Rockefeller's tenure ended, Ashley would serve as executive chef at the mansion until the end of Bill Clinton's administration in December 1990, when she retired. During Clinton's transition to the presidency, Ashley cooked for Clinton's transition team, who worked at the Governor's mansion. Two of her signature dishes were chocolate chip cookies and pound cake.

Then governor Dale Bumpers named December 20, 1974, "Eliza Jane Ashley Day" in Arkansas.

Her book, Thirty Years at the Mansion, co-authored with Carolyn Huber, was published in 1985. On her book tour, she appeared on Good Morning America and CNN. The following year, she was awarded the key to Lonoke County. Ashley was profiled by Ebony magazine in July 1989.

== Later life and legacy ==
In 1994, North Little Rock declared August 25 "Liza Ashley Day". She was named "Countess of Pulaski" of Pulaski County, Arkansas in 1997. During the Clinton administration, Ashley was invited multiple times to the White House for holiday dinners.

Ashley's personal papers were donated to the Butler Center for Arkansas Studies at the Central Arkansas Library in 2005.

She was active in the Sunshine Charity Club, a volunteer for the American Legion and also volunteered at Canaan Missionary Baptist Church in Little Rock. At Canaan, she attended Bible study every Sunday through her time in Little Rock.

After she turned ninety, she moved to Los Angeles, California. She died in Norwalk, California on November 13, 2020. She is buried at Little Rock National Cemetery.
