= 1978 United States Senate election in Arkansas =

- November 7, 1978
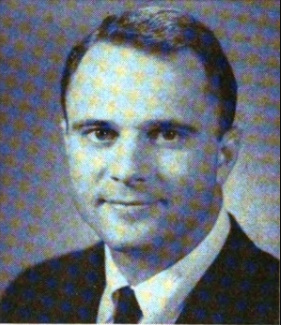

Nominee	David Pryor	Thomas Kelly Jr.	John G. Black
Party	Democratic	Republican	Independent
Popular vote	399,916	84,722	37,488
Percentage	76.58%	16.22%	7.18%
- County results Pryor: 50–60% 60–70% 70–80% 80–90%
U.S. senator before election
Kaneaster Hodges Jr.
Democratic
Elected U.S. Senator
David H. Pryor
Democratic

The 1978 United States Senate election in Arkansas took place on November 7, 1978. Incumbent U.S. Senator John L. McClellan, who announced his retirement, had died the previous November, leaving the seat vacant. Interim appointee Kaneaster Hodges Jr. did not run to the full seat, and was succeeded by Governor of Arkansas David Pryor.

Pryor won a highly-competitive three-way primary against U.S. Representatives Jim Guy Tucker and Ray Thornton, then defeated Tucker in a run-off election. Having secured the Democratic nomination, which was often tantamount to election in the American South prior to the 1980s, Pryor easily defeated Republican nominee Thomas Kelly and independent candidate John Black.

== Democratic primary ==
=== Candidates ===
- A.C. Grigson
- David Pryor, Governor of Arkansas
- Ray Thornton, U.S. Representative from Conway
- Jim Guy Tucker, U.S. Representative from Little Rock

=== Results ===
Democratic primary results
Party	Candidate	Votes	%
Democratic	David Pryor	198,041	34.27%
Democratic	Jim Guy Tucker	187,568	32.46%
Democratic	Ray Thornton	184,095	31.86%
Democratic	A.C. Grigson	8,166	1.41%
Total votes		577,870	100.00%

=== Run-off results ===
Democratic run-off results
Party	Candidate	Votes	%
Democratic	David Pryor	265,525	54.91%
Democratic	Jim Guy Tucker	218,026	45.09%
Total votes		483,551	100.00%

== General election ==
=== Results ===
General election results
Party	Candidate	Votes	%	±%
Democratic	David H. Pryor	399,916	76.58%	▲15.69
Republican	Thomas Kelly Jr.	84,722	16.22%	▼22.90
Independent	John G. Black	37,488	7.18%	N/A
Write-in	William Rock	113	0.02%	N/A
Total votes		522,239	0.02%	
Democratic hold		Swing		

== See also ==
- 1978 United States Senate elections
