= 1942 United States Senate election in Arkansas =

1942 U.S. Senate Democratic primary in Arkansas
- August 11, 1942
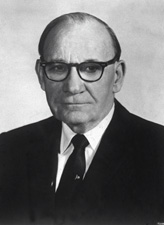

Nominee	John L. McClellan	Jack Holt
Party	Democratic	Democratic
Popular vote	134,277	83,516
Percentage	61.65%	31.35%
U.S. senator before election
Lloyd Spencer
Democratic
Elected U.S. Senator
John L. McClellan
Democratic

The 1942 United States Senate election in Arkansas took place on November 2, 1942. Incumbent Senator John E. Miller was appointed to a federal judgeship by Franklin Delano Roosevelt, and his appointed replacement Lloyd Spencer rejoined the Navy rather than run for election.

After a highly-competitive four-way primary, U.S. Representative John L. McClellan defeated Arkansas Attorney General Jack Holt in a run-off election.

Because the Republican Party (or any other party) did not field a candidate in the general election, McClellan's primary victory was tantamount to election.

== Democratic primary ==
=== Candidates ===
- Clyde T. Ellis, U.S. representative from Bentonville
- Jack Holt, attorney general of Arkansas
- John L. McClellan, U.S. representative from Camden
- David D. Terry, U.S. representative from Little Rock

=== Results ===
1942 Democratic U.S. Senate primary
Party	Candidate	Votes	%
Democratic	Jack Holt	54,185	32.05%
Democratic	John L. McClellan	53,729	31.78%
Democratic	Clyde Ellis	34,264	20.26%
Democratic	David D. Terry	26,911	15.92%
Total votes		169,089	100.00%

=== Runoff ===
1942 Democratic U.S. Senate runoff
Party	Candidate	Votes	%
Democratic	John L. McClellan	134,277	61.65%
Democratic	Jack Holt	83,516	38.35%
Total votes		217,793	100.00%

== General election ==
=== Results ===
McClellan was unopposed in the general election.

1942 U.S. Senate election in Arkansas
Party	Candidate	Votes	%
Democratic	John L. McClellan	99,124	100.00%
Total votes		99,124	100.00%

== See also ==
- 1942 United States Senate elections
