= Kaneaster Hodges Jr. =

American politician (1938–2022)

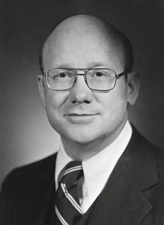

United States Senator from Arkansas
- In office December 10, 1977 – January 3, 1979
- Appointed by: David Pryor
- Preceded by: John L. McClellan
- Succeeded by: David Pryor

Personal details
- Born: August 20, 1938 Newport, Arkansas, U.S.
- Died: March 23, 2022 (aged 83) Little Rock, Arkansas, U.S.
- Party: Democratic
- Spouse: Lindley Williams
- Education: University of Arkansas Law School; Perkins School of Theology; Princeton University (A.B.); Newport High School

Kaneaster Hodges Jr. (/kə.ˈniː.stɜːr/ kə-NEE-stur; August 20, 1938 – March 23, 2022) was an American politician who served as a United States senator from Arkansas from 1977 to 1979. Hodges was appointed to the Senate to serve the remainder of Senator John L. McClellan's term after he died in 1977.

== Early life ==
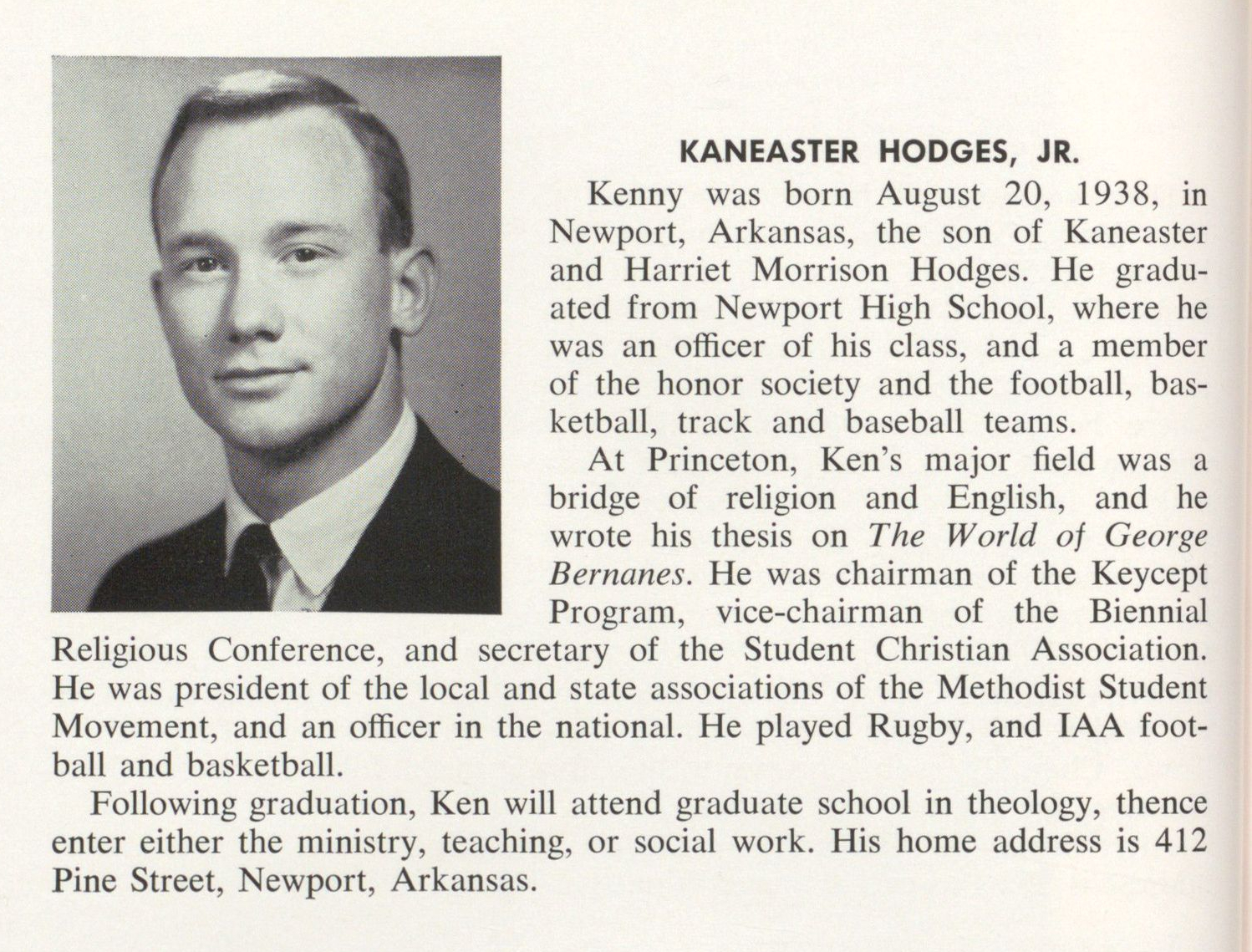
Hodges in the Princeton University yearbook, 1960

Hodges was born in Newport, Arkansas, the second of six children of Kaneaster Hodges Sr. and Harryette Morrison Hodges. He graduated from Newport High School in 1956, and achieved the rank of Eagle Scout. This achievement is cited as being one of his proudest.

He attended Princeton University, graduating cum laude in 1960 with an A.B. in religion after completing a senior thesis titled "George Bernanos: A Twentieth Century Prophet." Later that year, on June 26, he married Ruth Lindley Williams, whom he had gone to high school with. In life, they would have two children, Kaneaster Hodges III and Harryette Lindley Hodges. The two moved to Dallas, Texas and Hodges attended Perkins School of Theology at Southern Methodist University, graduating magna cum laude in 1963. He participated in the Methodist Student Movement, where he served as national president traveling the country in support of civil rights.

Hodges and his wife moved to Massachusetts in 1963, where he pastored two churches, the Acushnet Wesley Methodist Church and the Long Plain United Methodist Church. He commuted to Boston University where he earned a second master's degree in Pastoral Counseling. They moved to New York City in 1964, where Hodges was a chaplain intern at Rikers Island Correctional Institution.

Hodges moved to Fayetteville, Arkansas to attend the University of Arkansas School of Law. He was named editor-in-chief of the university's Arkansas Law Review. After graduating in 1967, he followed his father and brother at the Hodges, Hodges, and Hodges firm.

== Law and political career ==
During his career, in addition to practicing law Hodges was a farmer, Methodist lay minister, and hospital and prison chaplain. He served as city attorney for Newport and deputy prosecuting attorney for Jackson County, Arkansas, from 1967 to 1974.

Hodges worked for incumbent Senator John L. McClellan’s campaign for senator in 1972. McClellan defeated David Pryor in the Democratic primary, and went on to win the general election. In 1974, Hodges coordinated Pryor's successful gubernatorial race in eastern Arkansas.

In 1975, Hodges was legislative secretary for Governor Pryor. From 1974 to 1976, he was chairman of the Arkansas Natural Heritage Commission, and he was a member of the Arkansas Game and Fish Commission from 1976 to 1977.

In 1977, Senator McClellan died in office. Pryor appointed Hodges to serve out the remainder of McClellan's term. His time in the Senate was most noted for his stands in favor of the Panama Canal treaties and against tuition tax credits for parents of private school students. Hodges stepped down at the end of his term in 1979, and was replaced by Governor Pryor, who had won the 1978 election for the full term.

== Later life ==
Hodges returned to Newport after his Senate term. He became involved in several business ventures, including real estate development in Arkansas and adjoining states. He was also active in several civic and charitable causes, including the Arkansas Symphony Orchestra, Arkansas Nature Conservation Foundation, Winrock International, and the Arkansas Justice Foundation.

The Lindley and Kaneaster Hodges Jr. Reading Room at the University of Arkansas in Fayetteville is named for Hodges and his wife.

He was the uncle of Minneapolis Mayor Betsy Hodges.

Hodges died from an aortic aneurysm in Little Rock, Arkansas, on March 23, 2022, at the age of 83.

U.S. Senate
| Preceded by John Little McClellan | U.S. senator (Class 2) from Arkansas; 1977 – 1979; Served alongside: Dale Bumpers | Succeeded by David Pryor |
