= 1966 United States Senate election in Arkansas =

1966 U.S. Senate Democratic primary in Arkansas
- July 26, 1966
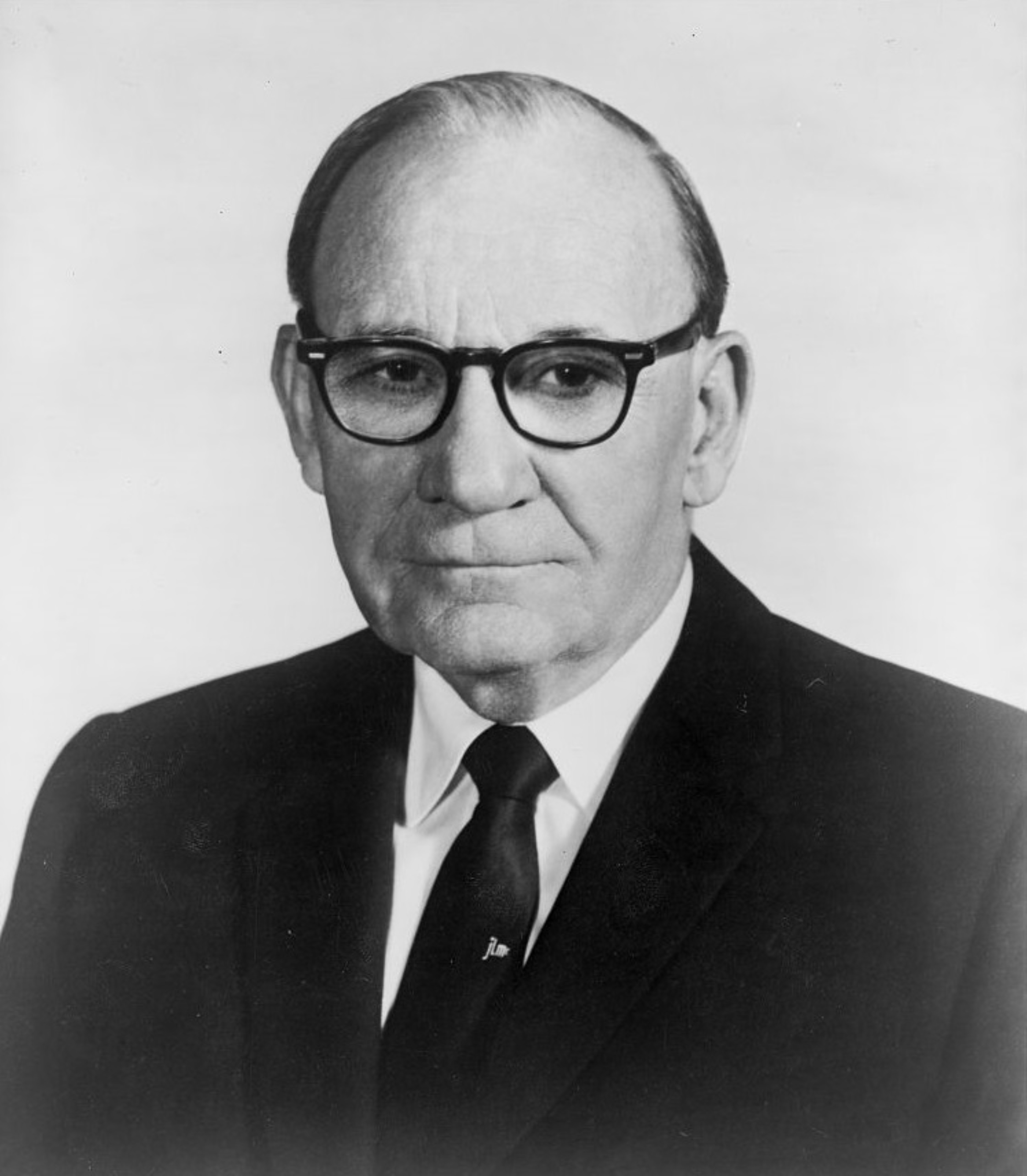

Nominee	John L. McClellan	Foster Johnson
Party	Democratic	Democratic
Popular vote	310,526	91,746
Percentage	77.19%	22.81%
U.S. senator before election
John L. McClellan
Democratic
Elected U.S. Senator
John L. McClellan
Democratic

The 1966 United States Senate election in Arkansas took place on November 8, 1966. Incumbent U.S. Senator John L. McClellan was re-elected to a fifth term in office.

Because the Republican Party (or any other party) did not field a candidate in the general election, McClellan's primary victory was tantamount to election.

== Democratic primary ==
=== Candidates ===
- Foster Johnson, Little Rock book salesman
- John L. McClellan, incumbent Senator

=== Campaign ===
For the first time since 1954, Senator John McClellan faced a challenger for the Democratic nomination, Foster Johnson, a 51-year-old book salesman and political neophyte. McClellan did not stage a formal campaign for re-election and ignored his opponent. Johnson did win the support of organized labor in the state but attracted little attention to his campaign otherwise.

=== Results ===
1966 Democratic U.S. Senate primary results
Party	Candidate	Votes	%
Democratic	John L. McClellan (inc.)	220,588	77.19%
Democratic	Foster Johnson	91,746	22.81%
Total votes		402,272	100.00%

== General election ==
McClellan was unopposed in the general election. At this time, Arkansas law did not require tabulation of votes for unopposed candidates.

== See also ==
- 1966 United States Senate elections
