= 1930 United States Senate election in Arkansas =

1930 U.S. Senate Democratic primary in Arkansas
- August 12, 1930
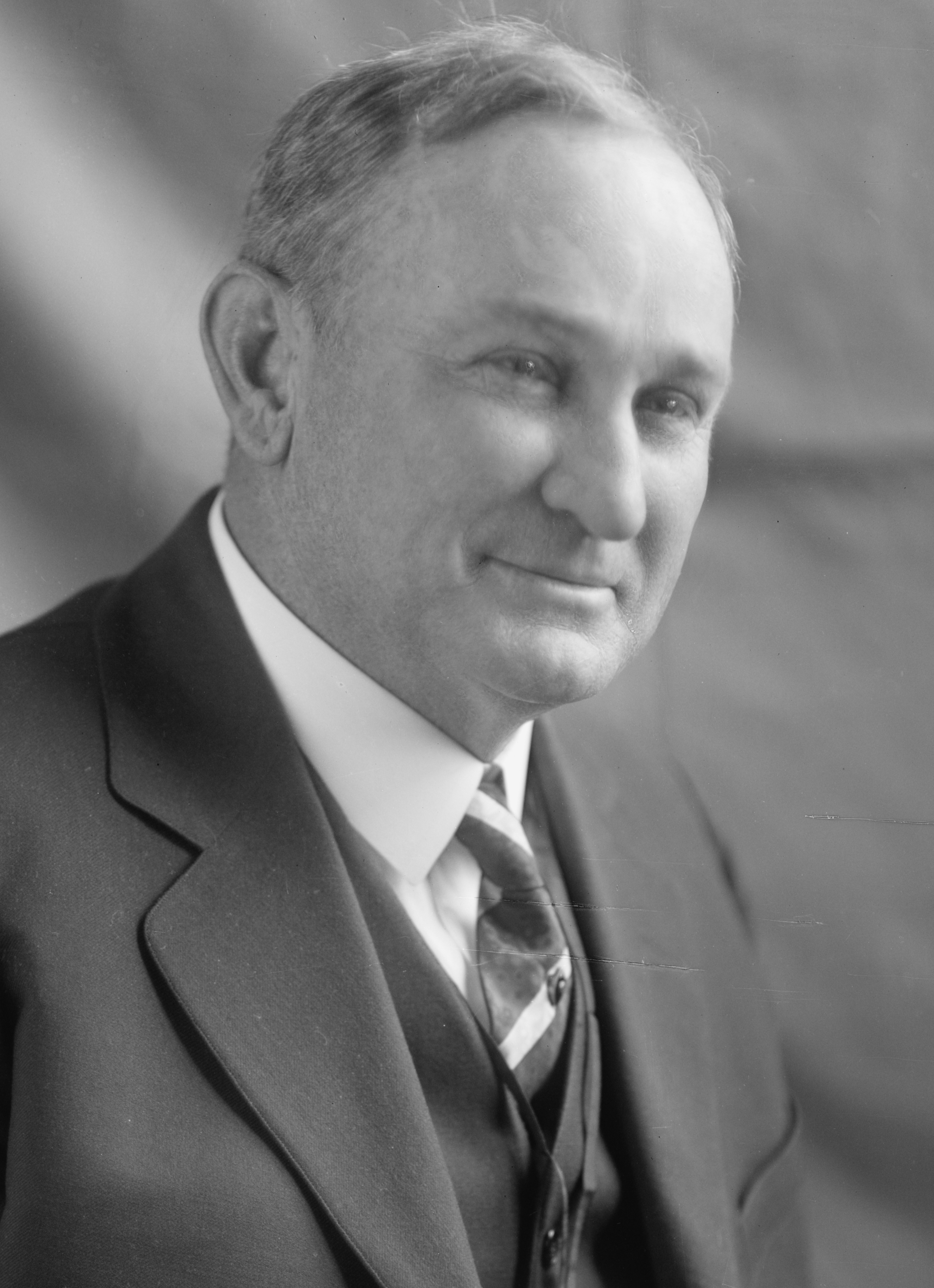

Nominee	Joe T. Robinson	Tom W. Campbell
Party	Democratic	Democratic
Popular vote	167,167	51,085
Percentage	76.59%	23.41%
- County results Robinson: 50–60% 60–70% 70–80% 80–90% >90%
U.S. senator before election
Joseph Taylor Robinson
Democratic
Elected U.S. Senator
Joseph Taylor Robinson
Democratic

The 1930 United States Senate election in Arkansas took place on November 4, 1930. Incumbent Democratic Senator Joseph Taylor Robinson was re-elected to a fourth term in office. He defeated Tom W. Campbell in the Democratic primary.

Because the Republican Party (or any other party) did not field a candidate in the general election, Robinson's primary victory was tantamount to election.

== Democratic primary ==
=== Candidates ===
- Tom W. Campbell
- Joseph Taylor Robinson, incumbent Senator since 1913 and 1928 Democratic nominee for Vice President of the United States

=== Results ===
1930 Democratic U.S. Senate primary
Party	Candidate	Votes	%
Democratic	Joseph T. Robinson (incumbent)	167,167	76.59%
Democratic	Tom W. Campbell	51,085	23.41%
Total votes		218,252	100.00%

== General election ==
=== Results ===
Robinson was unopposed for re-election.

1930 U.S. Senate election in Arkansas
Party	Candidate	Votes	%
Democratic	Joseph T. Robinson (incumbent)	141,906	100.00%
Total votes		141,906	100.00%

== See also ==
- 1930 United States Senate elections
