= 1924 United States Senate election in Arkansas =

- November 4, 1924
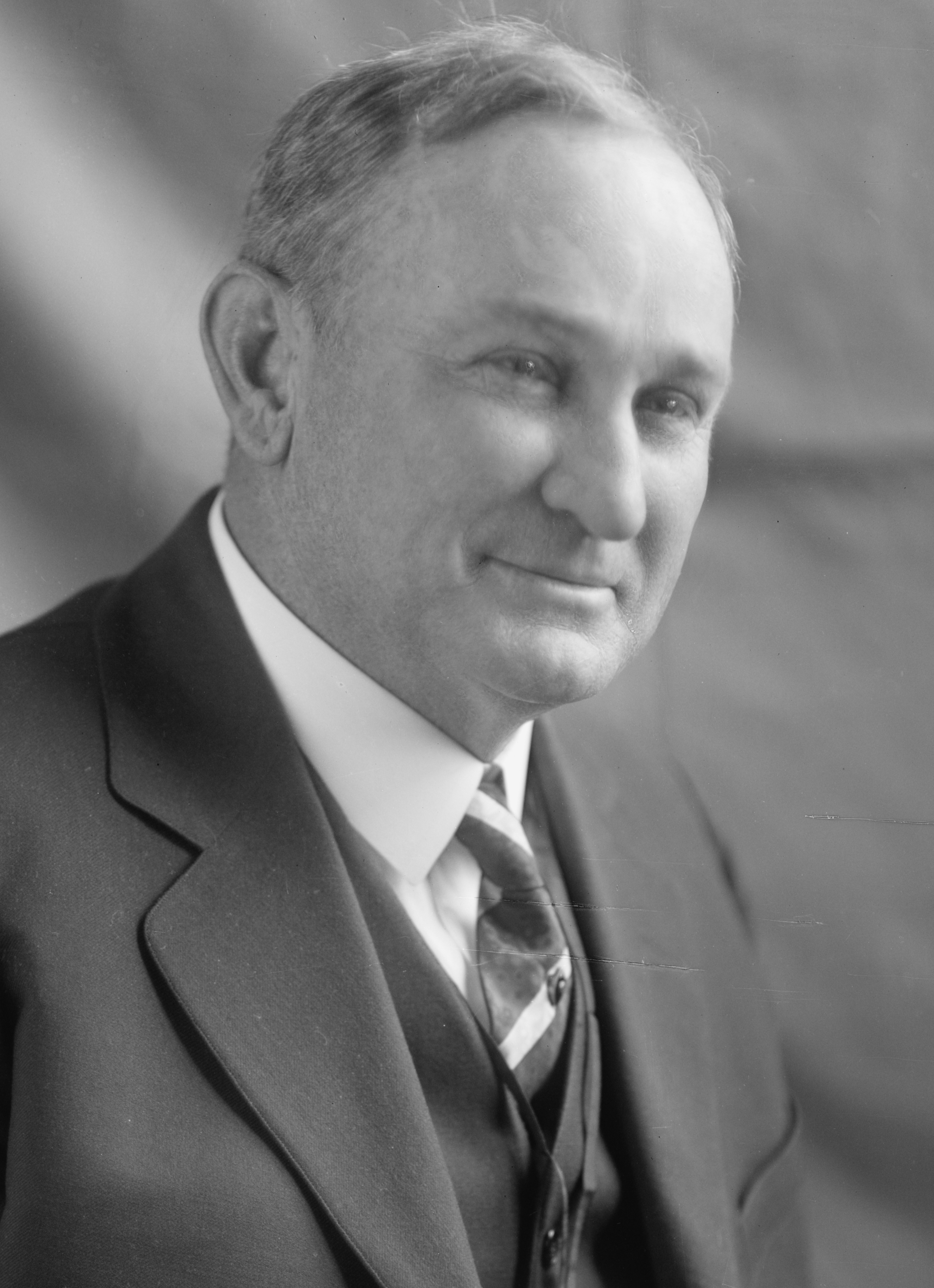

Nominee	Joe T. Robinson	Charles F. Cole
Party	Democratic	Republican
Popular vote	100,408	36,163
Percentage	73.52%	26.48%
- County results Robinson: 50–60% 60–70% 70–80% 80–90% >90% Cole: 50–60%
U.S. senator before election
Joseph Taylor Robinson
Democratic
Elected U.S. Senator
Joseph Taylor Robinson
Democratic

The 1924 United States Senate election in Arkansas took place on November 4, 1924. Incumbent Democratic Senator Joseph Taylor Robinson was re-elected to a third term in office over Republican Charles F. Cole.

== General election ==
=== Candidates ===
- Charles F. Cole (Republican)
- Joseph Taylor Robinson, incumbent Senator since 1913 (Democratic)

=== Results ===
1924 U.S. Senate election in Arkansas
Party	Candidate	Votes	%
Democratic	Joseph T. Robinson (incumbent)	100,408	73.52%
Republican	Charles F. Cole	36,163	26.48%
Total votes		136,571	100.00%

== See also ==
- 1924 United States Senate elections
