= William Kavanaugh Oldham =

Former Acting Governor of Arkansas

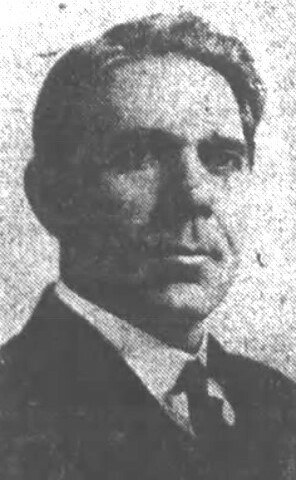

Acting Governor of Arkansas
- In office March 8, 1913 – March 13, 1913
- Preceded by: Joseph Taylor Robinson
- Succeeded by: Junius Marion Futrell (acting)

President of the Arkansas Senate
- In office 1913
- Succeeded by: Junius Marion Futrell

Personal details
- Born: May 20, 1865 Richmond, Kentucky, U.S.
- Died: May 6, 1938 (aged 72) Pettus, Arkansas, U.S.
- Party: Democratic Party

William Kavanaugh Oldham (May 20, 1865 – May 6, 1938) was the acting governor of Arkansas for six days in 1913. He served in the Arkansas House of Representatives and Arkansas Senate.

== Early life ==
Oldham was born in Richmond, Kentucky and educated at Central University, also in Richmond.

== Career ==
He moved to Pettus, Arkansas in Lonoke County in 1885 and became a successful cotton farmer.

He was elected to the Arkansas House of Representatives in 1907. He served as a member of the Arkansas Senate from 1911 to 1913, and was selected as president of the Senate in 1913.

When Governor Joseph Taylor Robinson resigned from office on March 8, 1913, Oldham became acting governor of Arkansas. When the legislative session ended on March 13, the Arkansas Senate elected Junius Marion Futrell as the new president pro tempore, but Oldham refused to agree that Futrell was the new acting governor; the dispute was settled by the Arkansas Supreme Court on March 24, in favor of Futrell.

== Later life ==
Oldham retired from public service and returned to farming. He later served as chairman of the state Cotton Reduction Committee.

William K. Oldham died in Pettus, Arkansas and is buried at the Oakland-Fraternal Cemetery in Little Rock, Arkansas.

== Family ==
Oldham was the brother-in-law of James Philip Eagle (1837–1904), governor of Arkansas 1889–1893, who married Oldham's sister Mary Kavanaugh Oldham in 1882. His younger brother Kie Oldham (1869–1916) served as James Eagle's private secretary while he was governor, curated an important collection of documents about Arkansas' Civil War history, and was a prominent lawyer, working primarily as an advocate for Native American tribes. Kie also served in the Arkansas state senate, in 1907 and 1908–9; in 1907 Kie and William were both in the legislature, representing the same county as representative and senator, respectively.

Oldham married Lillian Munroe (1870–1957) in 1894; they had two children, William Kavanaugh Oldham II (1896–1950) and Lillian Oldham (b. circa 1898).

Political offices
Preceded by Joseph Taylor Robinson; Governor	Acting Governor of Arkansas; 1913	Succeeded by Junius Marion Futrell; Acting
