= Lloyd Spencer =

American politician (1893–1981)

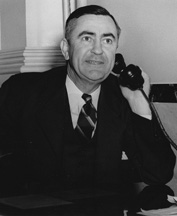

United States Senator from Arkansas
- In office April 1, 1941 – January 3, 1943
- Appointed by: Homer Martin Adkins
- Preceded by: John E. Miller
- Succeeded by: John L. McClellan

Personal details
- Born: George Lloyd Spencer; March 27, 1893 Sarcoxie, Missouri, U.S.
- Died: January 14, 1981 (aged 87) Hope, Arkansas, U.S.
- Party: Democratic

George Lloyd Spencer (March 27, 1893 – January 14, 1981) was an American politician from Arkansas. A member of the Democratic Party, he represented the state in the United States Senate from 1941 to 1943.

G. Lloyd Spencer was born in Sarcoxie, Missouri on March 27, 1893. Spencer moved to Okolona, Arkansas in 1902. Spencer attended public schools and the Peddie School at Hightstown, New Jersey. He attended Henderson College at Arkadelphia, Arkansas.

During World War I Spencer served in the United States Navy as a Seaman, Second Class. From 1931 to 1943 he served as a lieutenant commander in the United States Naval Reserve. He moved to Hope, Arkansas in 1921 and established a career in banking and farming.

Spencer was appointed to the United States Senate on April 1, 1941, to finish the unexpired term of Senator Joseph Taylor Robinson. He served until January 3, 1943, and did not stand for election, preferring instead to return to the Navy for World War II service.

He served as director of the Arkansas-Louisiana Gas Company at Shreveport, Louisiana and commissioner of the Southwest Arkansas Water District. He served as the Arkansas executive vice president of the Red River Valley Association as well. Spencer also served as the chairman of board and president of First National Bank of Hope, Arkansas.

George Lloyd Spencer died at Hope, Arkansas on January 14, 1981, and is buried in Rosehill Gardens in Hope.

U.S. Senate
Preceded by John E. Miller	U.S. senator (Class 2) from Arkansas; April 1, 1941 – January 3, 1943; Served alongside: Hattie Caraway	Succeeded by John L. McClellan
