= 1954 United States Senate election in Arkansas =

1954 U.S. Senate Democratic primary in Arkansas
- July 27, 1954

Nominee	John L. McClellan	Sid McMath
Party	Democratic	Democratic
Popular vote	164,905	127,941
Percentage	50.35%	39.06%
- County results McClellan: 40–50% 50–60% 60–70% 70–80% 80–90% McMath: 40–50% 50–60% 60–70% 70–80% 80–90%
U.S. senator before election
John L. McClellan
Democratic
Elected U.S. Senator
John L. McClellan
Democratic

The 1954 United States Senate election in Arkansas took place on November 2, 1954. Incumbent U.S. Senator John L. McClellan was re-elected to a third term in office, after defeating a primary challenge from former Governor of Arkansas Sid McMath.

Because the Republican Party (or any other party) did not field a candidate in the general election, McClellan's primary victory was tantamount to election.

== Background ==
In 1952, incumbent Governor of Arkansas Sid McMath was defeated in a hotly contested Democratic primary by judge Francis Cherry, who went on to win the election in the landslide fashion typical of Southern Democrats at the time. McMath, a young political liberal, blamed his defeat on his own refusal to acquiesce to "power interests" in the state, specifically his plan for a farmer-owned Ozark steam generating plant. McMath claimed that representatives of the "power interests" had offered him political support if he would drop his support for the plan, but he declined.

McMath had been identified as an aspirant to the Senate as early as his 1949 inauguration as Governor. He announced a campaign against Senator John L. McClellan in early 1954; McClellan, who openly supported Cherry in 1952, had not faced a serious political challenge since he won the seat in 1942.

== Democratic primary ==
=== Candidates ===
- Paul Chambers, Democratic National Committeeman
- Leonard Ellis
- John L. McClellan, incumbent Senator
- Sid McMath, former Governor of Arkansas from 1949 to 1953

=== Campaign ===
McMath began the campaign for the nomination aggressively, while McClellan made every effort to ignore his opposition and emphasize his own record as Senator, including the provision of various public works and the preservation of federal installations within Arkansas. Two other candidates entered the race without directly challenging McClellan. Paul Chambers, a Democratic National Committeeman, engaged in a "questio-thon," conducting interviews on various local radio stations. Leonard Ellis ran no active campaign.

The campaign shaped up as personally as well as ideologically bitter; McMath attacked McClellan for his age and ideological conservatism, charging that the Senator favored "the corporations over the people" and was in the thrall of "Texas oil millionaires." He doubled down on these accusations by calling McClellan "an errand boy for the big interests." McMath himself was identified as "a thoroughgoing Fair Dealer;" he had campaigned for President Truman throughout the South in 1948 (despite Dixiecrat opposition) and received Truman's endorsement in his failed 1952 re-election campaign. In particular, he criticized two key votes McClellan had cast: one to grant title to oil tidelands to individual coastal states (thus depriving Arkansas of access) and one to provide Germany funds to repay its pre-World War II bonds.

McMath challenged McClellan to a series of joint debates in mid-April, but McClellan initially declined to respond.

Upon eventually entering the fray in July, McClellan said that McMath's 1952 defeat had ended his career in politics, telling voters that McMath should have "crawl[ed] into a political hole" after being repudiated by 100,000 votes. McClellan also criticized McMath's record as Governor, blaming him for a $4,500,000 net increase in utility rates. Governor Cherry, who faced broad opposition for his second term, initially vowed to stay out of the contest but campaigned with McClellan in the final stages.

McMath, who relied on support from the state's organized labor movement, faced a setback late in the campaign when several former labor leaders criticized him for "playing labor for a sucker" in a newspaper advertisement.

=== Results ===
1954 Democratic U.S. Senate primary results
Party	Candidate	Votes	%
Democratic	John L. McClellan (inc.)	164,905	50.35%
Democratic	Sid McMath	127,941	39.06%
Democratic	Paul Chambers	31,286	9.55%
Democratic	Leonard Ellis	3,391	1.04%
Total votes		327,523	100.00%

== General election ==
=== Results ===
McClellan was unopposed in the general election.

1954 Democratic U.S. Senate results
Party	Candidate	Votes	%
Democratic	John L. McClellan (inc.)	291,058	100.00%
Total votes		291,058	100.00%

== See also ==
1954 United States Senate elections
