= 1936 United States Senate election in Arkansas =

- November 3, 1936
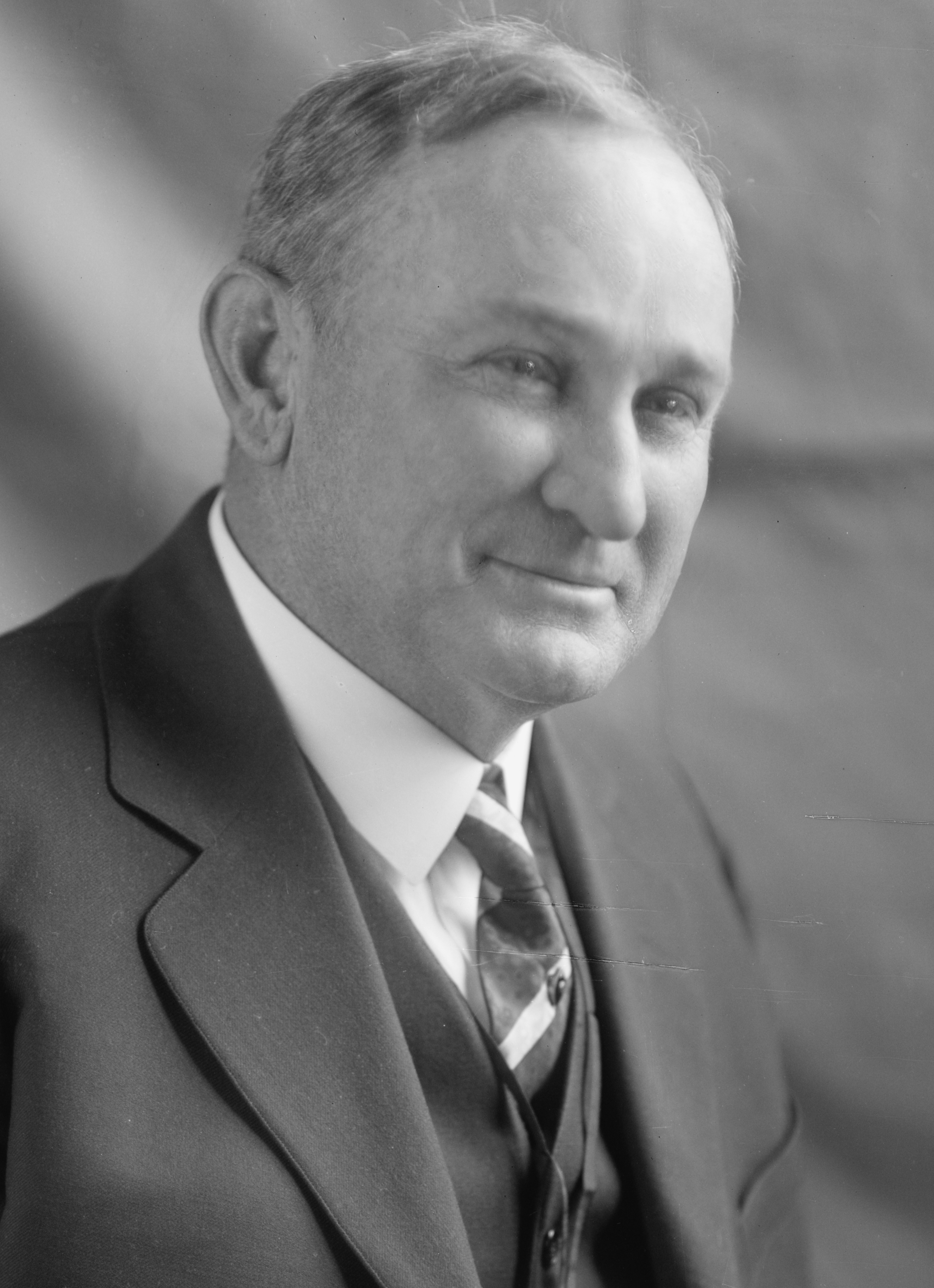

Nominee	Joseph T. Robinson	G.C. Ledbetter
Party	Democratic	Republican
Popular vote	170,336	27,746
Percentage	84.08%	15.06%
- County results Robinson: 50–60% 60–70% 70–80% 80–90% >90% Ledbetter: 50–60% Williams: 50–60% Tie: 40–50%
U.S. senator before election
Joseph T. Robinson
Democratic
Elected U.S. Senator
Joseph T. Robinson
Democratic

The 1936 United States Senate election in Arkansas took place on November 3, 1936. Incumbent Democratic Senator and Senate Majority Leader Joseph T. Robinson was re-elected to a fifth term in office. He defeated two Democratic opponents in the primary election and then dispatched Republican G.C. Ledbetter in the general election.

== Democratic primary ==
=== Candidates ===
- Cleveland Holland
- Joseph Taylor Robinson, incumbent Senator since 1913 and Senate Majority Leader since 1933
- J. Rosser Venable

=== Results ===
1936 Democratic U.S. Senate primary
Party	Candidate	Votes	%
Democratic	Joseph T. Robinson (incumbent)	170,356	72.72%
Democratic	Cleveland Holland	42,541	18.16%
Democratic	J. Rosser Venable	21,352	9.12%
Total votes		234,249	100.00%

== General election ==
=== Results ===
1936 U.S. Senate election in Arkansas
Party	Candidate	Votes	%
Democratic	Joseph Taylor Robinson (incumbent)	154,866	84.08%
Republican	G.C. Ledbetter	27,746	15.06%
Socialist	Claude C. Williams	1,587	0.86%
Total votes		184,199	100.00%

== See also ==
- 1936 United States Senate elections
