= 1960 United States Senate election in Arkansas =

- November 8, 1960
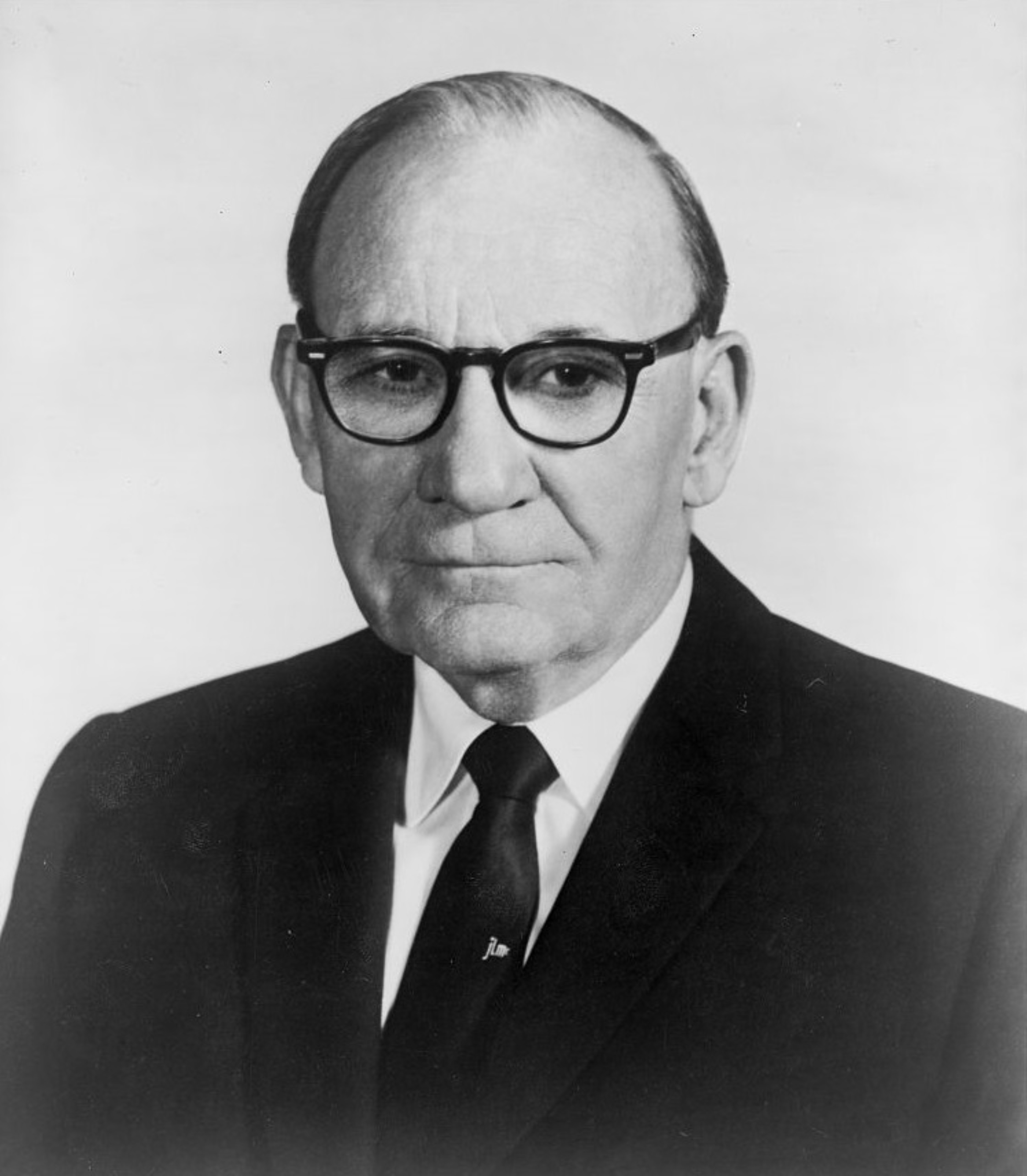
Nominee	John L. McClellan
Party	Democratic
Popular vote	337,036
Percentage	99.88%
- County results McClellan: 90–100%
U.S. senator before election
John L. McClellan
Democratic
Elected U.S. Senator
John L. McClellan
Democratic

The 1960 United States Senate election in Arkansas took place on November 8, 1960. Incumbent Democratic U.S. Senator John L. McClellan was re-elected to a fourth term in office.

Because McClellan faced only token opposition in the general election, his unopposed victory in the July 26 primary was tantamount to election.

== Democratic primary ==
The Democratic primary election was held on July 26, 1960.

=== Candidates ===
- John L. McClellan, incumbent U.S. Senator

=== Results ===
1960 Democratic U.S. Senate primary
Party	Candidate	Votes	%
Democratic	John L. McClellan (incumbent)		unopposed

== General election ==
=== Results ===
1960 U.S. Senate election in Arkansas
Party	Candidate	Votes	%	±%
Democratic	John L. McClellan (incumbent)	377,036	99.88%	
Write-in	Marvin Fuchs	449	0.12%	
Turnout		377,485		
Democratic hold		Swing		

== Bibliography ==
- Congressional Elections, 1946-1996. Washington, D.C.: Congressional Quarterly Inc. 1998. ISBN 1-56802-248-4.
- Martin, Mark (2018). Historical Report of the Secretary of State (PDF). Little Rock, Arkansas: Arkansas Secretary of State's Office. ISBN 978-0-692-03553-5.
