= List of United States senators from Arkansas =

Current delegation

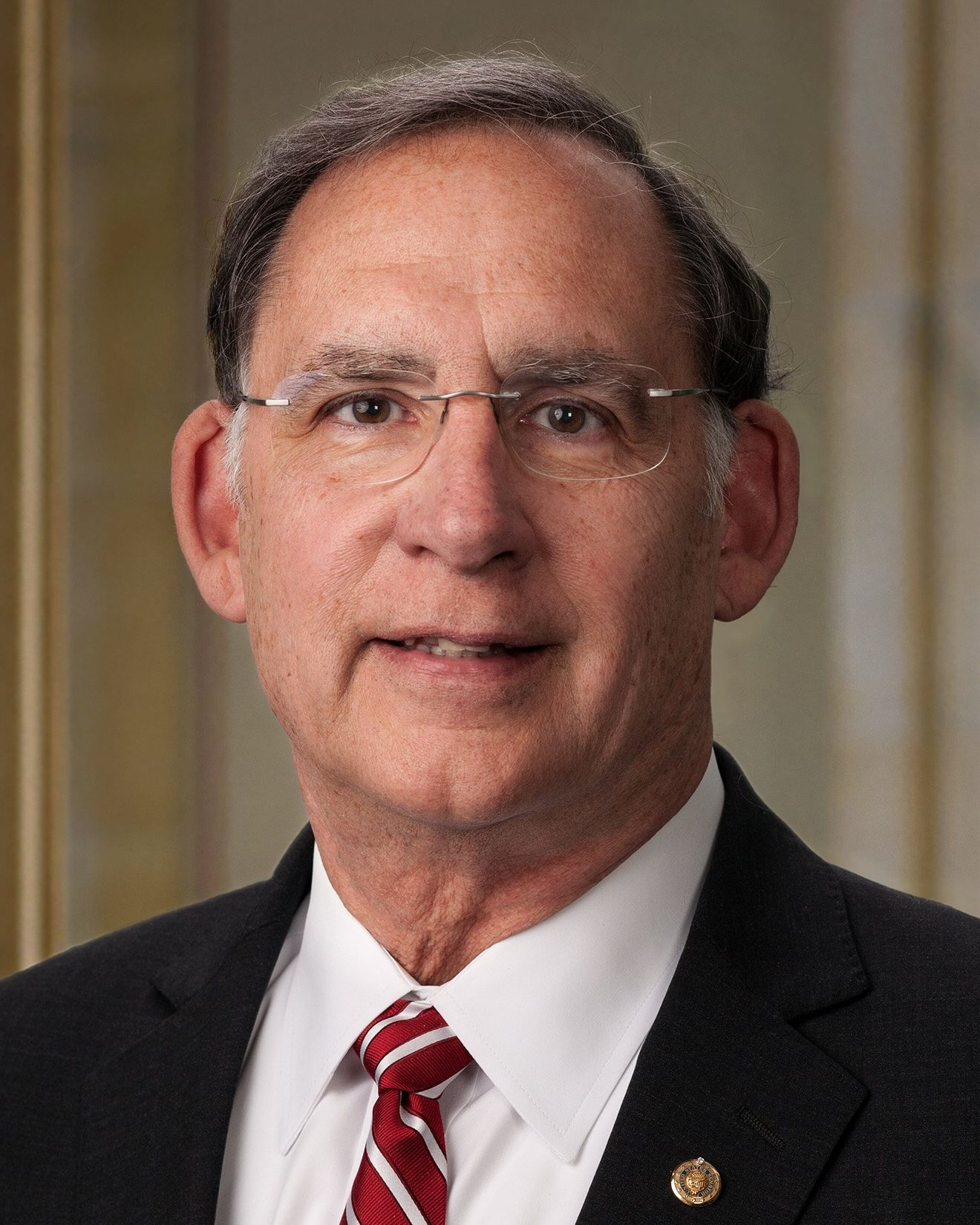
John Boozman (R)

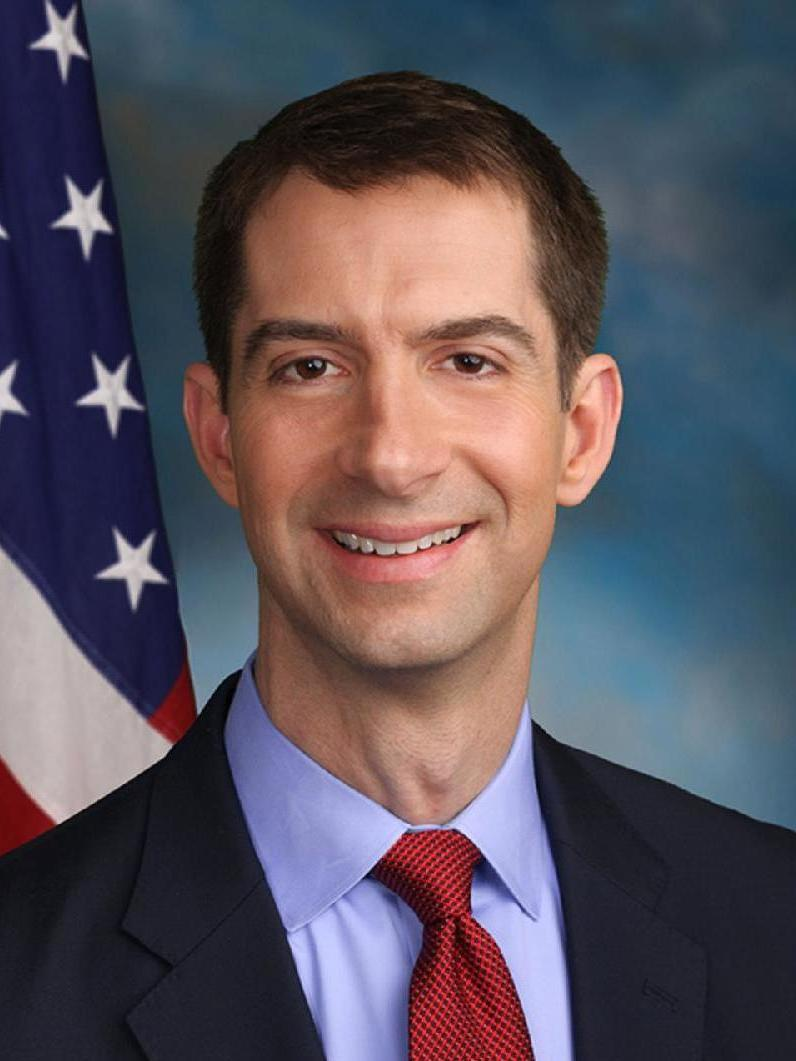
Tom Cotton (R)

(ordered by seniority)

Arkansas was admitted to the Union on June 15, 1836, and elects its senators to class 2 and class 3. Arkansas's Senate seats were declared vacant in July 1861, due to its secession from the Union. They were again filled from June 1868. Its current senators are Republicans John Boozman and Tom Cotton. John L. McClellan was Arkansas's longest-serving senator (1943–1977).

== List of senators ==
Class 2 Class 2 senators belong to the electoral cycle that most recently had regular elections in 2008, 2014, 2020, and 2026. The next election will be in 2032.						C	Class 3 Class 3 senators belong to the electoral cycle that most recently had regular elections in 2004, 2010, 2016, and 2022. The next election will be in 2028.					
#	Senator	Party	Dates in office	Electoral history	T	C	T	Electoral history	Dates in office	Party	Senator	#
1	William S. Fulton (Little Rock)	Jacksonian	Sep 18, 1836 – Aug 15, 1844	Elected in 1836.	1	24th	1	Elected in 1836.	Sep 18, 1836 – Mar 15, 1848	Jacksonian	Ambrose Hundley Sevier (Pine Bluff)	1
1	William S. Fulton (Little Rock)	Democratic	Sep 18, 1836 – Aug 15, 1844	Elected in 1836.	1	25th	2	Re-elected in 1837.	Sep 18, 1836 – Mar 15, 1848	Democratic	Ambrose Hundley Sevier (Pine Bluff)	1
1	William S. Fulton (Little Rock)	Democratic	Sep 18, 1836 – Aug 15, 1844	Elected in 1836.	1	26th	2	Re-elected in 1837.	Sep 18, 1836 – Mar 15, 1848	Democratic	Ambrose Hundley Sevier (Pine Bluff)	1
1	William S. Fulton (Little Rock)	Democratic	Sep 18, 1836 – Aug 15, 1844	Re-elected in 1840. Died.	2	27th	2	Re-elected in 1837.	Sep 18, 1836 – Mar 15, 1848	Democratic	Ambrose Hundley Sevier (Pine Bluff)	1
1	William S. Fulton (Little Rock)	Democratic	Sep 18, 1836 – Aug 15, 1844	Re-elected in 1840. Died.	2	28th	3	Re-elected in 1843. Resigned.	Sep 18, 1836 – Mar 15, 1848	Democratic	Ambrose Hundley Sevier (Pine Bluff)	1
Vacant			Aug 15, 1844 – Nov 8, 1844		2	28th	3	Re-elected in 1843. Resigned.	Sep 18, 1836 – Mar 15, 1848	Democratic	Ambrose Hundley Sevier (Pine Bluff)	1
2	Chester Ashley (Little Rock)	Democratic	Nov 8, 1844 – Apr 29, 1848	Elected to finish Fulton's term.	2	28th	3	Re-elected in 1843. Resigned.	Sep 18, 1836 – Mar 15, 1848	Democratic	Ambrose Hundley Sevier (Pine Bluff)	1
2	Chester Ashley (Little Rock)	Democratic	Nov 8, 1844 – Apr 29, 1848	Elected to finish Fulton's term.	2	29th	3	Re-elected in 1843. Resigned.	Sep 18, 1836 – Mar 15, 1848	Democratic	Ambrose Hundley Sevier (Pine Bluff)	1
2	Chester Ashley (Little Rock)	Democratic	Nov 8, 1844 – Apr 29, 1848	Elected to a full term in 1846. Died.	3	30th	3	Re-elected in 1843. Resigned.	Sep 18, 1836 – Mar 15, 1848	Democratic	Ambrose Hundley Sevier (Pine Bluff)	1
2	Chester Ashley (Little Rock)	Democratic	Nov 8, 1844 – Apr 29, 1848	Elected to a full term in 1846. Died.	3	30th	3		Mar 15, 1848 – Mar 30, 1848	Vacant		
2	Chester Ashley (Little Rock)	Democratic	Nov 8, 1844 – Apr 29, 1848	Elected to a full term in 1846. Died.	3	30th	3	Appointed to finish Sevier's term.	Mar 30, 1848 – Apr 11, 1853	Democratic	Solon Borland (Hot Springs)	2
Vacant			Apr 29, 1848 – May 12, 1848		3	30th	3	Appointed to finish Sevier's term.	Mar 30, 1848 – Apr 11, 1853	Democratic	Solon Borland (Hot Springs)	2
3	William K. Sebastian (Helena)	Democratic	May 12, 1848 – Jul 11, 1861	Appointed to continue Ashley's term. Elected in 1848 to finish Ashley's term.	3	30th	3	Appointed to finish Sevier's term.	Mar 30, 1848 – Apr 11, 1853	Democratic	Solon Borland (Hot Springs)	2
3	William K. Sebastian (Helena)	Democratic	May 12, 1848 – Jul 11, 1861	Appointed to continue Ashley's term. Elected in 1848 to finish Ashley's term.	3	31st	4	Elected to full term in 1848. Resigned.	Mar 30, 1848 – Apr 11, 1853	Democratic	Solon Borland (Hot Springs)	2
3	William K. Sebastian (Helena)	Democratic	May 12, 1848 – Jul 11, 1861	Appointed to continue Ashley's term. Elected in 1848 to finish Ashley's term.	3	32nd	4	Elected to full term in 1848. Resigned.	Mar 30, 1848 – Apr 11, 1853	Democratic	Solon Borland (Hot Springs)	2
3	William K. Sebastian (Helena)	Democratic	May 12, 1848 – Jul 11, 1861	Elected to full term in 1853.	4	33rd	4	Elected to full term in 1848. Resigned.	Mar 30, 1848 – Apr 11, 1853	Democratic	Solon Borland (Hot Springs)	2
3	William K. Sebastian (Helena)	Democratic	May 12, 1848 – Jul 11, 1861	Elected to full term in 1853.	4	33rd	4		Apr 11, 1853 – Jul 6, 1853	Vacant		
3	William K. Sebastian (Helena)	Democratic	May 12, 1848 – Jul 11, 1861	Elected to full term in 1853.	4	33rd	4	Appointed to continue Borland's term. Elected in 1854 to finish Borland's term.	Jul 6, 1853 – Mar 3, 1861	Democratic	Robert Ward Johnson (Pine Bluff)	3
3	William K. Sebastian (Helena)	Democratic	May 12, 1848 – Jul 11, 1861	Elected to full term in 1853.	4	34th	5	Re-elected in 1855. Retired.	Jul 6, 1853 – Mar 3, 1861	Democratic	Robert Ward Johnson (Pine Bluff)	3
3	William K. Sebastian (Helena)	Democratic	May 12, 1848 – Jul 11, 1861	Elected to full term in 1853.	4	35th	5	Re-elected in 1855. Retired.	Jul 6, 1853 – Mar 3, 1861	Democratic	Robert Ward Johnson (Pine Bluff)	3
3	William K. Sebastian (Helena)	Democratic	May 12, 1848 – Jul 11, 1861	Re-elected in 1859. Expelled. (Expulsion was reversed by the Senate in 1877).	5	36th	5	Re-elected in 1855. Retired.	Jul 6, 1853 – Mar 3, 1861	Democratic	Robert Ward Johnson (Pine Bluff)	3
3	William K. Sebastian (Helena)	Democratic	May 12, 1848 – Jul 11, 1861	Re-elected in 1859. Expelled. (Expulsion was reversed by the Senate in 1877).	5	37th	6	Elected in 1860 or 1861. Expelled for supporting the Confederacy.	Mar 4, 1861 – Jul 11, 1861	Democratic	Charles B. Mitchel (Little Rock)	4
Vacant			Jul 11, 1861 – Jun 22, 1868	Civil War and Reconstruction	5	37th	6	Civil War and Reconstruction	Jul 11, 1861 – Jun 23, 1868	Vacant		
Vacant			Jul 11, 1861 – Jun 22, 1868	Civil War and Reconstruction	5	38th	6	Civil War and Reconstruction	Jul 11, 1861 – Jun 23, 1868	Vacant		
Vacant			Jul 11, 1861 – Jun 22, 1868	Civil War and Reconstruction	6	39th	6	Civil War and Reconstruction	Jul 11, 1861 – Jun 23, 1868	Vacant		
Vacant			Jul 11, 1861 – Jun 22, 1868	Civil War and Reconstruction	6	40th	7	Civil War and Reconstruction	Jul 11, 1861 – Jun 23, 1868	Vacant		
4	Alexander McDonald (Little Rock)	Republican	Jun 22, 1868 – Mar 3, 1871	Elected upon readmission. Lost re-election.	6	40th	7	Civil War and Reconstruction	Jul 11, 1861 – Jun 23, 1868	Vacant		
4	Alexander McDonald (Little Rock)	Republican	Jun 22, 1868 – Mar 3, 1871	Elected upon readmission. Lost re-election.	6	40th	7	Elected upon readmission. Unknown if retired or lost re-election.	Jun 23, 1868 – Mar 3, 1873	Republican	Benjamin F. Rice (Little Rock)	5
4	Alexander McDonald (Little Rock)	Republican	Jun 22, 1868 – Mar 3, 1871	Elected upon readmission. Lost re-election.	6	41st	7	Elected upon readmission. Unknown if retired or lost re-election.	Jun 23, 1868 – Mar 3, 1873	Republican	Benjamin F. Rice (Little Rock)	5
5	Powell Clayton (Little Rock)	Republican	Mar 4, 1871 – Mar 3, 1877	Elected in 1870. Unknown if retired or lost re-election.	7	42nd	7	Elected upon readmission. Unknown if retired or lost re-election.	Jun 23, 1868 – Mar 3, 1873	Republican	Benjamin F. Rice (Little Rock)	5
5	Powell Clayton (Little Rock)	Republican	Mar 4, 1871 – Mar 3, 1877	Elected in 1870. Unknown if retired or lost re-election.	7	43rd	8	Elected in 1872 or 1873. Retired.	Mar 4, 1873 – Mar 3, 1879	Republican	Stephen W. Dorsey (Helena)	6
5	Powell Clayton (Little Rock)	Republican	Mar 4, 1871 – Mar 3, 1877	Elected in 1870. Unknown if retired or lost re-election.	7	44th	8	Elected in 1872 or 1873. Retired.	Mar 4, 1873 – Mar 3, 1879	Republican	Stephen W. Dorsey (Helena)	6
6	Augustus H. Garland (Little Rock)	Democratic	Mar 4, 1877 – Mar 6, 1885	Elected in 1876.	8	45th	8	Elected in 1872 or 1873. Retired.	Mar 4, 1873 – Mar 3, 1879	Republican	Stephen W. Dorsey (Helena)	6
6	Augustus H. Garland (Little Rock)	Democratic	Mar 4, 1877 – Mar 6, 1885	Elected in 1876.	8	46th	9	Elected in 1878. Retired.	Mar 4, 1879 – Mar 3, 1885	Democratic	James D. Walker (Fayetteville)	7
6	Augustus H. Garland (Little Rock)	Democratic	Mar 4, 1877 – Mar 6, 1885	Elected in 1876.	8	47th	9	Elected in 1878. Retired.	Mar 4, 1879 – Mar 3, 1885	Democratic	James D. Walker (Fayetteville)	7
6	Augustus H. Garland (Little Rock)	Democratic	Mar 4, 1877 – Mar 6, 1885	Re-elected in 1883. Resigned to become U.S. Attorney General.	9	48th	9	Elected in 1878. Retired.	Mar 4, 1879 – Mar 3, 1885	Democratic	James D. Walker (Fayetteville)	7
6	Augustus H. Garland (Little Rock)	Democratic	Mar 4, 1877 – Mar 6, 1885	Re-elected in 1883. Resigned to become U.S. Attorney General.	9	49th	10	Elected in 1885.	Mar 4, 1885 – Mar 3, 1903	Democratic	James K. Jones (Washington)	8
Vacant			Mar 6, 1885 – Mar 20, 1885		9	49th	10	Elected in 1885.	Mar 4, 1885 – Mar 3, 1903	Democratic	James K. Jones (Washington)	8
7	James H. Berry (Bentonville)	Democratic	Mar 20, 1885 – Mar 3, 1907	Elected to finish Garland's term.	9	49th	10	Elected in 1885.	Mar 4, 1885 – Mar 3, 1903	Democratic	James K. Jones (Washington)	8
7	James H. Berry (Bentonville)	Democratic	Mar 20, 1885 – Mar 3, 1907	Elected to finish Garland's term.	9	50th	10	Elected in 1885.	Mar 4, 1885 – Mar 3, 1903	Democratic	James K. Jones (Washington)	8
7	James H. Berry (Bentonville)	Democratic	Mar 20, 1885 – Mar 3, 1907	Re-elected in 1889.	10	51st	10	Elected in 1885.	Mar 4, 1885 – Mar 3, 1903	Democratic	James K. Jones (Washington)	8
7	James H. Berry (Bentonville)	Democratic	Mar 20, 1885 – Mar 3, 1907	Re-elected in 1889.	10	52nd	11	Re-elected in 1891.	Mar 4, 1885 – Mar 3, 1903	Democratic	James K. Jones (Washington)	8
7	James H. Berry (Bentonville)	Democratic	Mar 20, 1885 – Mar 3, 1907	Re-elected in 1889.	10	53rd	11	Re-elected in 1891.	Mar 4, 1885 – Mar 3, 1903	Democratic	James K. Jones (Washington)	8
7	James H. Berry (Bentonville)	Democratic	Mar 20, 1885 – Mar 3, 1907	Re-elected in 1895.	11	54th	11	Re-elected in 1891.	Mar 4, 1885 – Mar 3, 1903	Democratic	James K. Jones (Washington)	8
7	James H. Berry (Bentonville)	Democratic	Mar 20, 1885 – Mar 3, 1907	Re-elected in 1895.	11	55th	12	Re-elected in 1897. Lost re-election.	Mar 4, 1885 – Mar 3, 1903	Democratic	James K. Jones (Washington)	8
7	James H. Berry (Bentonville)	Democratic	Mar 20, 1885 – Mar 3, 1907	Re-elected in 1895.	11	56th	12	Re-elected in 1897. Lost re-election.	Mar 4, 1885 – Mar 3, 1903	Democratic	James K. Jones (Washington)	8
7	James H. Berry (Bentonville)	Democratic	Mar 20, 1885 – Mar 3, 1907	Re-elected in 1901. Lost re-election.	12	57th	12	Re-elected in 1897. Lost re-election.	Mar 4, 1885 – Mar 3, 1903	Democratic	James K. Jones (Washington)	8
7	James H. Berry (Bentonville)	Democratic	Mar 20, 1885 – Mar 3, 1907	Re-elected in 1901. Lost re-election.	12	58th	13	Elected in 1903.	Mar 4, 1903 – Oct 1, 1916	Democratic	James P. Clarke (Little Rock)	9
7	James H. Berry (Bentonville)	Democratic	Mar 20, 1885 – Mar 3, 1907	Re-elected in 1901. Lost re-election.	12	59th	13	Elected in 1903.	Mar 4, 1903 – Oct 1, 1916	Democratic	James P. Clarke (Little Rock)	9
8	Jeff Davis (Little Rock)	Democratic	Mar 4, 1907 – Jan 3, 1913	Elected in 1907. Died.	13	60th	13	Elected in 1903.	Mar 4, 1903 – Oct 1, 1916	Democratic	James P. Clarke (Little Rock)	9
8	Jeff Davis (Little Rock)	Democratic	Mar 4, 1907 – Jan 3, 1913	Elected in 1907. Died.	13	61st	14	Re-elected in 1909.	Mar 4, 1903 – Oct 1, 1916	Democratic	James P. Clarke (Little Rock)	9
8	Jeff Davis (Little Rock)	Democratic	Mar 4, 1907 – Jan 3, 1913	Elected in 1907. Died.	13	62nd	14	Re-elected in 1909.	Mar 4, 1903 – Oct 1, 1916	Democratic	James P. Clarke (Little Rock)	9
Vacant			Jan 3, 1913 – Jan 6, 1913		13	62nd	14	Re-elected in 1909.	Mar 4, 1903 – Oct 1, 1916	Democratic	James P. Clarke (Little Rock)	9
9	John N. Heiskell (Little Rock)	Democratic	Jan 6, 1913 – Jan 29, 1913	Appointed to continue Davis's term. Successor qualified.	13	62nd	14	Re-elected in 1909.	Mar 4, 1903 – Oct 1, 1916	Democratic	James P. Clarke (Little Rock)	9
10	William M. Kavanaugh (Little Rock)	Democratic	Jan 29, 1913 – Mar 3, 1913	Elected to finish Davis's term. Retired.	13	62nd	14	Re-elected in 1909.	Mar 4, 1903 – Oct 1, 1916	Democratic	James P. Clarke (Little Rock)	9
11	Joseph T. Robinson (Little Rock)	Democratic	Mar 4, 1913 – Jul 14, 1937	Elected in 1913. (Note: Robinson was the last U.S. senator elected by a state legislature before the ratification of the Seventeenth Amendment to the United States Constitution.)	14	63rd	14	Re-elected in 1909.	Mar 4, 1903 – Oct 1, 1916	Democratic	James P. Clarke (Little Rock)	9
11	Joseph T. Robinson (Little Rock)	Democratic	Mar 4, 1913 – Jul 14, 1937	Elected in 1913.	14	64th	15	Re-elected in 1914. Died.	Mar 4, 1903 – Oct 1, 1916	Democratic	James P. Clarke (Little Rock)	9
11	Joseph T. Robinson (Little Rock)	Democratic	Mar 4, 1913 – Jul 14, 1937	Elected in 1913.	14	64th	15		Oct 1, 1916 – Nov 8, 1916	Vacant		
11	Joseph T. Robinson (Little Rock)	Democratic	Mar 4, 1913 – Jul 14, 1937	Elected in 1913.	14	64th	15	Elected to finish Clarke's term. Lost renomination.	Nov 8, 1916 – Mar 3, 1921	Democratic	William F. Kirby (Little Rock)	10
11	Joseph T. Robinson (Little Rock)	Democratic	Mar 4, 1913 – Jul 14, 1937	Elected in 1913.	14	65th	15	Elected to finish Clarke's term. Lost renomination.	Nov 8, 1916 – Mar 3, 1921	Democratic	William F. Kirby (Little Rock)	10
11	Joseph T. Robinson (Little Rock)	Democratic	Mar 4, 1913 – Jul 14, 1937	Re-elected in 1918.	15	66th	15	Elected to finish Clarke's term. Lost renomination.	Nov 8, 1916 – Mar 3, 1921	Democratic	William F. Kirby (Little Rock)	10
11	Joseph T. Robinson (Little Rock)	Democratic	Mar 4, 1913 – Jul 14, 1937	Re-elected in 1918.	15	67th	16	Elected in 1920.	Mar 4, 1921 – Nov 6, 1931	Democratic	Thaddeus H. Caraway (Jonesboro)	11
11	Joseph T. Robinson (Little Rock)	Democratic	Mar 4, 1913 – Jul 14, 1937	Re-elected in 1918.	15	68th	16	Elected in 1920.	Mar 4, 1921 – Nov 6, 1931	Democratic	Thaddeus H. Caraway (Jonesboro)	11
11	Joseph T. Robinson (Little Rock)	Democratic	Mar 4, 1913 – Jul 14, 1937	Re-elected in 1924.	16	69th	16	Elected in 1920.	Mar 4, 1921 – Nov 6, 1931	Democratic	Thaddeus H. Caraway (Jonesboro)	11
11	Joseph T. Robinson (Little Rock)	Democratic	Mar 4, 1913 – Jul 14, 1937	Re-elected in 1924.	16	70th	17	Re-elected in 1926. Died.	Mar 4, 1921 – Nov 6, 1931	Democratic	Thaddeus H. Caraway (Jonesboro)	11
11	Joseph T. Robinson (Little Rock)	Democratic	Mar 4, 1913 – Jul 14, 1937	Re-elected in 1924.	16	71st	17	Re-elected in 1926. Died.	Mar 4, 1921 – Nov 6, 1931	Democratic	Thaddeus H. Caraway (Jonesboro)	11
11	Joseph T. Robinson (Little Rock)	Democratic	Mar 4, 1913 – Jul 14, 1937	Re-elected in 1930.	17	72nd	17	Re-elected in 1926. Died.	Mar 4, 1921 – Nov 6, 1931	Democratic	Thaddeus H. Caraway (Jonesboro)	11
11	Joseph T. Robinson (Little Rock)	Democratic	Mar 4, 1913 – Jul 14, 1937	Re-elected in 1930.	17	72nd	17		Nov 6, 1931 – Nov 13, 1931	Vacant		
11	Joseph T. Robinson (Little Rock)	Democratic	Mar 4, 1913 – Jul 14, 1937	Re-elected in 1930.	17	72nd	17	Appointed to finish her husband's term. Elected in 1932 to finish her husband's term.	Nov 13, 1931 – Jan 3, 1945	Democratic	Hattie Caraway (Jonesboro)	12
11	Joseph T. Robinson (Little Rock)	Democratic	Mar 4, 1913 – Jul 14, 1937	Re-elected in 1930.	17	73rd	18	Re-elected in 1932.	Nov 13, 1931 – Jan 3, 1945	Democratic	Hattie Caraway (Jonesboro)	12
11	Joseph T. Robinson (Little Rock)	Democratic	Mar 4, 1913 – Jul 14, 1937	Re-elected in 1930.	17	74th	18	Re-elected in 1932.	Nov 13, 1931 – Jan 3, 1945	Democratic	Hattie Caraway (Jonesboro)	12
11	Joseph T. Robinson (Little Rock)	Democratic	Mar 4, 1913 – Jul 14, 1937	Re-elected in 1936. Died.	18	75th	18	Re-elected in 1932.	Nov 13, 1931 – Jan 3, 1945	Democratic	Hattie Caraway (Jonesboro)	12
Vacant			Jul 14, 1937 – Nov 15, 1937		18	75th	18	Re-elected in 1932.	Nov 13, 1931 – Jan 3, 1945	Democratic	Hattie Caraway (Jonesboro)	12
12	John E. Miller (Searcy)	Democratic	Nov 15, 1937 – Mar 31, 1941	Elected to finish Robinson's term. Resigned to become U.S. District Judge.	18	75th	18	Re-elected in 1932.	Nov 13, 1931 – Jan 3, 1945	Democratic	Hattie Caraway (Jonesboro)	12
12	John E. Miller (Searcy)	Democratic	Nov 15, 1937 – Mar 31, 1941	Elected to finish Robinson's term. Resigned to become U.S. District Judge.	18	76th	19	Re-elected in 1938. Lost renomination.	Nov 13, 1931 – Jan 3, 1945	Democratic	Hattie Caraway (Jonesboro)	12
12	John E. Miller (Searcy)	Democratic	Nov 15, 1937 – Mar 31, 1941	Elected to finish Robinson's term. Resigned to become U.S. District Judge.	18	77th	19	Re-elected in 1938. Lost renomination.	Nov 13, 1931 – Jan 3, 1945	Democratic	Hattie Caraway (Jonesboro)	12
Vacant			Mar 31, 1941 – Apr 1, 1941		18	77th	19	Re-elected in 1938. Lost renomination.	Nov 13, 1931 – Jan 3, 1945	Democratic	Hattie Caraway (Jonesboro)	12
13	Lloyd Spencer (Hope)	Democratic	Apr 1, 1941 – Jan 3, 1943	Appointed to finish Robinson's term. Retired.	18	77th	19	Re-elected in 1938. Lost renomination.	Nov 13, 1931 – Jan 3, 1945	Democratic	Hattie Caraway (Jonesboro)	12
14	John L. McClellan (Little Rock)	Democratic	Jan 3, 1943 – Nov 28, 1977	Elected in 1942.	19	78th	19	Re-elected in 1938. Lost renomination.	Nov 13, 1931 – Jan 3, 1945	Democratic	Hattie Caraway (Jonesboro)	12
14	John L. McClellan (Little Rock)	Democratic	Jan 3, 1943 – Nov 28, 1977	Elected in 1942.	19	79th	20	Elected in 1944.	Jan 3, 1945 – Dec 31, 1974	Democratic	J. William Fulbright (Fayetteville)	13
14	John L. McClellan (Little Rock)	Democratic	Jan 3, 1943 – Nov 28, 1977	Elected in 1942.	19	80th	20	Elected in 1944.	Jan 3, 1945 – Dec 31, 1974	Democratic	J. William Fulbright (Fayetteville)	13
14	John L. McClellan (Little Rock)	Democratic	Jan 3, 1943 – Nov 28, 1977	Re-elected in 1948.	20	81st	20	Elected in 1944.	Jan 3, 1945 – Dec 31, 1974	Democratic	J. William Fulbright (Fayetteville)	13
14	John L. McClellan (Little Rock)	Democratic	Jan 3, 1943 – Nov 28, 1977	Re-elected in 1948.	20	82nd	21	Re-elected in 1950.	Jan 3, 1945 – Dec 31, 1974	Democratic	J. William Fulbright (Fayetteville)	13
14	John L. McClellan (Little Rock)	Democratic	Jan 3, 1943 – Nov 28, 1977	Re-elected in 1948.	20	83rd	21	Re-elected in 1950.	Jan 3, 1945 – Dec 31, 1974	Democratic	J. William Fulbright (Fayetteville)	13
14	John L. McClellan (Little Rock)	Democratic	Jan 3, 1943 – Nov 28, 1977	Re-elected in 1954.	21	84th	21	Re-elected in 1950.	Jan 3, 1945 – Dec 31, 1974	Democratic	J. William Fulbright (Fayetteville)	13
14	John L. McClellan (Little Rock)	Democratic	Jan 3, 1943 – Nov 28, 1977	Re-elected in 1954.	21	85th	22	Re-elected in 1956.	Jan 3, 1945 – Dec 31, 1974	Democratic	J. William Fulbright (Fayetteville)	13
14	John L. McClellan (Little Rock)	Democratic	Jan 3, 1943 – Nov 28, 1977	Re-elected in 1954.	21	86th	22	Re-elected in 1956.	Jan 3, 1945 – Dec 31, 1974	Democratic	J. William Fulbright (Fayetteville)	13
14	John L. McClellan (Little Rock)	Democratic	Jan 3, 1943 – Nov 28, 1977	Re-elected in 1960.	22	87th	22	Re-elected in 1956.	Jan 3, 1945 – Dec 31, 1974	Democratic	J. William Fulbright (Fayetteville)	13
14	John L. McClellan (Little Rock)	Democratic	Jan 3, 1943 – Nov 28, 1977	Re-elected in 1960.	22	88th	23	Re-elected in 1962.	Jan 3, 1945 – Dec 31, 1974	Democratic	J. William Fulbright (Fayetteville)	13
14	John L. McClellan (Little Rock)	Democratic	Jan 3, 1943 – Nov 28, 1977	Re-elected in 1960.	22	89th	23	Re-elected in 1962.	Jan 3, 1945 – Dec 31, 1974	Democratic	J. William Fulbright (Fayetteville)	13
14	John L. McClellan (Little Rock)	Democratic	Jan 3, 1943 – Nov 28, 1977	Re-elected in 1966.	23	90th	23	Re-elected in 1962.	Jan 3, 1945 – Dec 31, 1974	Democratic	J. William Fulbright (Fayetteville)	13
14	John L. McClellan (Little Rock)	Democratic	Jan 3, 1943 – Nov 28, 1977	Re-elected in 1966.	23	91st	24	Re-elected in 1968. Lost re-nomination, then resigned.	Jan 3, 1945 – Dec 31, 1974	Democratic	J. William Fulbright (Fayetteville)	13
14	John L. McClellan (Little Rock)	Democratic	Jan 3, 1943 – Nov 28, 1977	Re-elected in 1966.	23	92nd	24	Re-elected in 1968. Lost re-nomination, then resigned.	Jan 3, 1945 – Dec 31, 1974	Democratic	J. William Fulbright (Fayetteville)	13
14	John L. McClellan (Little Rock)	Democratic	Jan 3, 1943 – Nov 28, 1977	Re-elected in 1972. Died.	24	93rd	24	Re-elected in 1968. Lost re-nomination, then resigned.	Jan 3, 1945 – Dec 31, 1974	Democratic	J. William Fulbright (Fayetteville)	13
14	John L. McClellan (Little Rock)	Democratic	Jan 3, 1943 – Nov 28, 1977	Re-elected in 1972. Died.	24	93rd	24		Dec 31, 1974 – Jan 3, 1975	Vacant		
14	John L. McClellan (Little Rock)	Democratic	Jan 3, 1943 – Nov 28, 1977	Re-elected in 1972. Died.	24	94th	25	Elected in 1974.	Jan 3, 1975 – Jan 3, 1999	Democratic	Dale Bumpers (Charleston)	14
14	John L. McClellan (Little Rock)	Democratic	Jan 3, 1943 – Nov 28, 1977	Re-elected in 1972. Died.	24	95th	25	Elected in 1974.	Jan 3, 1975 – Jan 3, 1999	Democratic	Dale Bumpers (Charleston)	14
Vacant			Nov 28, 1977 – Dec 10, 1977		24	95th	25	Elected in 1974.	Jan 3, 1975 – Jan 3, 1999	Democratic	Dale Bumpers (Charleston)	14
15	Kaneaster Hodges Jr. (Newport)	Democratic	Dec 10, 1977 – Jan 3, 1979	Appointed to finish McClellan's term. Retired.	24	95th	25	Elected in 1974.	Jan 3, 1975 – Jan 3, 1999	Democratic	Dale Bumpers (Charleston)	14
16	David Pryor (Little Rock)	Democratic	Jan 3, 1979 – Jan 3, 1997	Elected in 1978.	25	96th	25	Elected in 1974.	Jan 3, 1975 – Jan 3, 1999	Democratic	Dale Bumpers (Charleston)	14
16	David Pryor (Little Rock)	Democratic	Jan 3, 1979 – Jan 3, 1997	Elected in 1978.	25	97th	26	Re-elected in 1980.	Jan 3, 1975 – Jan 3, 1999	Democratic	Dale Bumpers (Charleston)	14
16	David Pryor (Little Rock)	Democratic	Jan 3, 1979 – Jan 3, 1997	Elected in 1978.	25	98th	26	Re-elected in 1980.	Jan 3, 1975 – Jan 3, 1999	Democratic	Dale Bumpers (Charleston)	14
16	David Pryor (Little Rock)	Democratic	Jan 3, 1979 – Jan 3, 1997	Re-elected in 1984.	26	99th	26	Re-elected in 1980.	Jan 3, 1975 – Jan 3, 1999	Democratic	Dale Bumpers (Charleston)	14
16	David Pryor (Little Rock)	Democratic	Jan 3, 1979 – Jan 3, 1997	Re-elected in 1984.	26	100th	27	Re-elected in 1986.	Jan 3, 1975 – Jan 3, 1999	Democratic	Dale Bumpers (Charleston)	14
16	David Pryor (Little Rock)	Democratic	Jan 3, 1979 – Jan 3, 1997	Re-elected in 1984.	26	101st	27	Re-elected in 1986.	Jan 3, 1975 – Jan 3, 1999	Democratic	Dale Bumpers (Charleston)	14
16	David Pryor (Little Rock)	Democratic	Jan 3, 1979 – Jan 3, 1997	Re-elected in 1990. Retired.	27	102nd	27	Re-elected in 1986.	Jan 3, 1975 – Jan 3, 1999	Democratic	Dale Bumpers (Charleston)	14
16	David Pryor (Little Rock)	Democratic	Jan 3, 1979 – Jan 3, 1997	Re-elected in 1990. Retired.	27	103rd	28	Re-elected in 1992. Retired.	Jan 3, 1975 – Jan 3, 1999	Democratic	Dale Bumpers (Charleston)	14
16	David Pryor (Little Rock)	Democratic	Jan 3, 1979 – Jan 3, 1997	Re-elected in 1990. Retired.	27	104th	28	Re-elected in 1992. Retired.	Jan 3, 1975 – Jan 3, 1999	Democratic	Dale Bumpers (Charleston)	14
17	Tim Hutchinson (Bentonville)	Republican	Jan 3, 1997 – Jan 3, 2003	Elected in 1996. Lost re-election.	28	105th	28	Re-elected in 1992. Retired.	Jan 3, 1975 – Jan 3, 1999	Democratic	Dale Bumpers (Charleston)	14
17	Tim Hutchinson (Bentonville)	Republican	Jan 3, 1997 – Jan 3, 2003	Elected in 1996. Lost re-election.	28	106th	29	Elected in 1998.	Jan 3, 1999 – Jan 3, 2011	Democratic	Blanche Lincoln (Helena)	15
17	Tim Hutchinson (Bentonville)	Republican	Jan 3, 1997 – Jan 3, 2003	Elected in 1996. Lost re-election.	28	107th	29	Elected in 1998.	Jan 3, 1999 – Jan 3, 2011	Democratic	Blanche Lincoln (Helena)	15
18	Mark Pryor (Little Rock)	Democratic	Jan 3, 2003 – Jan 3, 2015	Elected in 2002.	29	108th	29	Elected in 1998.	Jan 3, 1999 – Jan 3, 2011	Democratic	Blanche Lincoln (Helena)	15
18	Mark Pryor (Little Rock)	Democratic	Jan 3, 2003 – Jan 3, 2015	Elected in 2002.	29	109th	30	Re-elected in 2004. Lost re-election.	Jan 3, 1999 – Jan 3, 2011	Democratic	Blanche Lincoln (Helena)	15
18	Mark Pryor (Little Rock)	Democratic	Jan 3, 2003 – Jan 3, 2015	Elected in 2002.	29	110th	30	Re-elected in 2004. Lost re-election.	Jan 3, 1999 – Jan 3, 2011	Democratic	Blanche Lincoln (Helena)	15
18	Mark Pryor (Little Rock)	Democratic	Jan 3, 2003 – Jan 3, 2015	Re-elected in 2008. Lost re-election.	30	111th	30	Re-elected in 2004. Lost re-election.	Jan 3, 1999 – Jan 3, 2011	Democratic	Blanche Lincoln (Helena)	15
18	Mark Pryor (Little Rock)	Democratic	Jan 3, 2003 – Jan 3, 2015	Re-elected in 2008. Lost re-election.	30	112th	31	Elected in 2010.	Jan 3, 2011 – present	Republican	John Boozman (Rogers)	16
18	Mark Pryor (Little Rock)	Democratic	Jan 3, 2003 – Jan 3, 2015	Re-elected in 2008. Lost re-election.	30	113th	31	Elected in 2010.	Jan 3, 2011 – present	Republican	John Boozman (Rogers)	16
19	Tom Cotton (Little Rock)	Republican	Jan 3, 2015 – present	Elected in 2014.	31	114th	31	Elected in 2010.	Jan 3, 2011 – present	Republican	John Boozman (Rogers)	16
19	Tom Cotton (Little Rock)	Republican	Jan 3, 2015 – present	Elected in 2014.	31	115th	32	Re-elected in 2016.	Jan 3, 2011 – present	Republican	John Boozman (Rogers)	16
19	Tom Cotton (Little Rock)	Republican	Jan 3, 2015 – present	Elected in 2014.	31	116th	32	Re-elected in 2016.	Jan 3, 2011 – present	Republican	John Boozman (Rogers)	16
19	Tom Cotton (Little Rock)	Republican	Jan 3, 2015 – present	Re-elected in 2020.	32	117th	32	Re-elected in 2016.	Jan 3, 2011 – present	Republican	John Boozman (Rogers)	16
19	Tom Cotton (Little Rock)	Republican	Jan 3, 2015 – present	Re-elected in 2020.	32	118th	33	Re-elected in 2022.	Jan 3, 2011 – present	Republican	John Boozman (Rogers)	16
19	Tom Cotton (Little Rock)	Republican	Jan 3, 2015 – present	Re-elected in 2020.	32	119th	33	Re-elected in 2022.	Jan 3, 2011 – present	Republican	John Boozman (Rogers)	16
19	Tom Cotton (Little Rock)	Republican	Jan 3, 2015 – present	Re-elected in 2026.	33	120th	33	Re-elected in 2022.	Jan 3, 2011 – present	Republican	John Boozman (Rogers)	16
19	Tom Cotton (Little Rock)	Republican	Jan 3, 2015 – present	Re-elected in 2026.	33	121st	34	To be determined in the 2028 election.				
19	Tom Cotton (Little Rock)	Republican	Jan 3, 2015 – present	Re-elected in 2026.	33	122nd	34	To be determined in the 2028 election.				
To be determined in the 2032 election.					34	123rd	34	To be determined in the 2028 election.				

== See also ==
- Arkansas's congressional delegations
- Elections in Arkansas
- List of United States representatives from Arkansas
