= Joseph T. Robinson =

American politician (1872–1937)

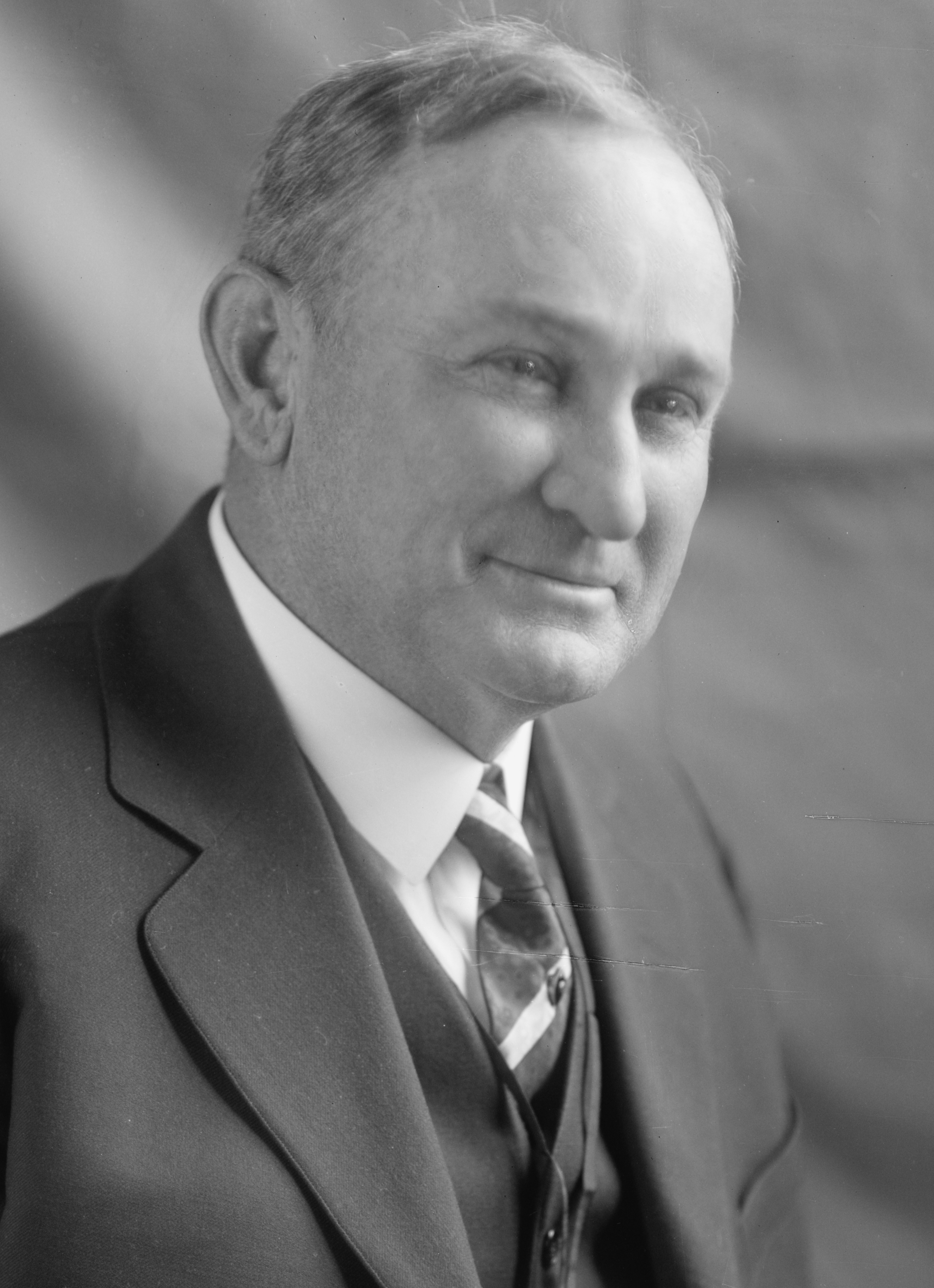
- Robinson, c. 1913–1937

United States Senator from Arkansas
- In office March 10, 1913 – July 14, 1937
- Preceded by: William M. Kavanaugh
- Succeeded by: John E. Miller
Senate positions
Senate Majority Leader
In office March 4, 1933 – July 14, 1937
Deputy	J. Hamilton Lewis
Preceded by	James Eli Watson
Succeeded by	Alben W. Barkley
Senate Minority Leader
In office December 3, 1923 – March 4, 1933
Deputy	Peter G. Gerry; Morris Sheppard
Preceded by	Oscar Underwood
Succeeded by	Charles L. McNary
Chair of the Senate Democratic Caucus
In office December 3, 1923 – July 14, 1937
Preceded by	Oscar Underwood
Succeeded by	Alben W. Barkley

23rd Governor of Arkansas
- In office January 16, 1913 – March 8, 1913
- Preceded by: George Washington Donaghey
- Succeeded by: William Kavanaugh Oldham (acting)

Member of the U.S. House of Representatives from Arkansas's 6th district
- In office March 4, 1903 – January 14, 1913
- Preceded by: Stephen Brundidge Jr.
- Succeeded by: Samuel M. Taylor

Personal details
- Born: Joseph Taylor Robinson; August 26, 1872 Lonoke, Arkansas, U.S.
- Died: July 14, 1937 (aged 64) Washington, D.C., U.S.
- Party: Democratic
- Education: University of Virginia (LLB)
- Robinson's voice Robinson administering the vice presidential oath of office to John Nance Garner; Recorded January 20, 1937

Joseph Taylor Robinson (August 26, 1872 – July 14, 1937) was an American politician who served as United States Senator from Arkansas from 1913 to 1937, serving for four years as Senate Majority Leader and ten as Minority Leader. A member of the Democratic Party, he previously served as the state's 23rd governor, and was also the Democratic vice presidential nominee in the 1928 presidential election.

After studying law at the University of Virginia, Robinson returned to Arkansas, winning election to the Arkansas General Assembly. He won election to the United States House of Representatives, serving from 1903 to 1913. He won election as governor of Arkansas in 1912, but resigned from that position in 1913 to take a seat in the Senate. In the Senate, Robinson established himself as a progressive and strong supporter of President Woodrow Wilson. Robinson served as the chairman of the 1920 Democratic National Convention and won election as the Senate Minority Leader in 1923. He sought the Democratic presidential nomination in the 1924 election and was nominated as the Democratic vice presidential nominee in 1928. The Democratic ticket of Al Smith and Robinson lost in a landslide to the Republican ticket of Herbert Hoover and Charles Curtis.

The Democrats took control of the Senate after the 1932 Senate elections and elected Robinson as Senate Majority Leader. With this role, he was credited with strengthening the power of the role of Senate Majority Leader. He passed Franklin D. Roosevelt's New Deal programs through the Senate, alienating some of his colleagues with his autocratic style. However, his vital role in getting legislation passed directly in the Senate chamber earned him the recognition as the New Deal's "marshal." In the midst of debate over the Judicial Procedures Reform Bill of 1937, Robinson died due to heart failure.

Robinson is the last senator elected by state legislature before the Seventeenth Amendment to the United States Constitution, as well as the last senator chosen solely by a state legislature without a prior advisory primary or popular preference vote to remain in office.

== Early life and education ==
Robinson was born in Lonoke, Arkansas, the son of Matilda Jane (née Swaim) and James Madison Robinson. He attended the University of Arkansas and earned a law degree from the University of Virginia School of Law.

== Career ==
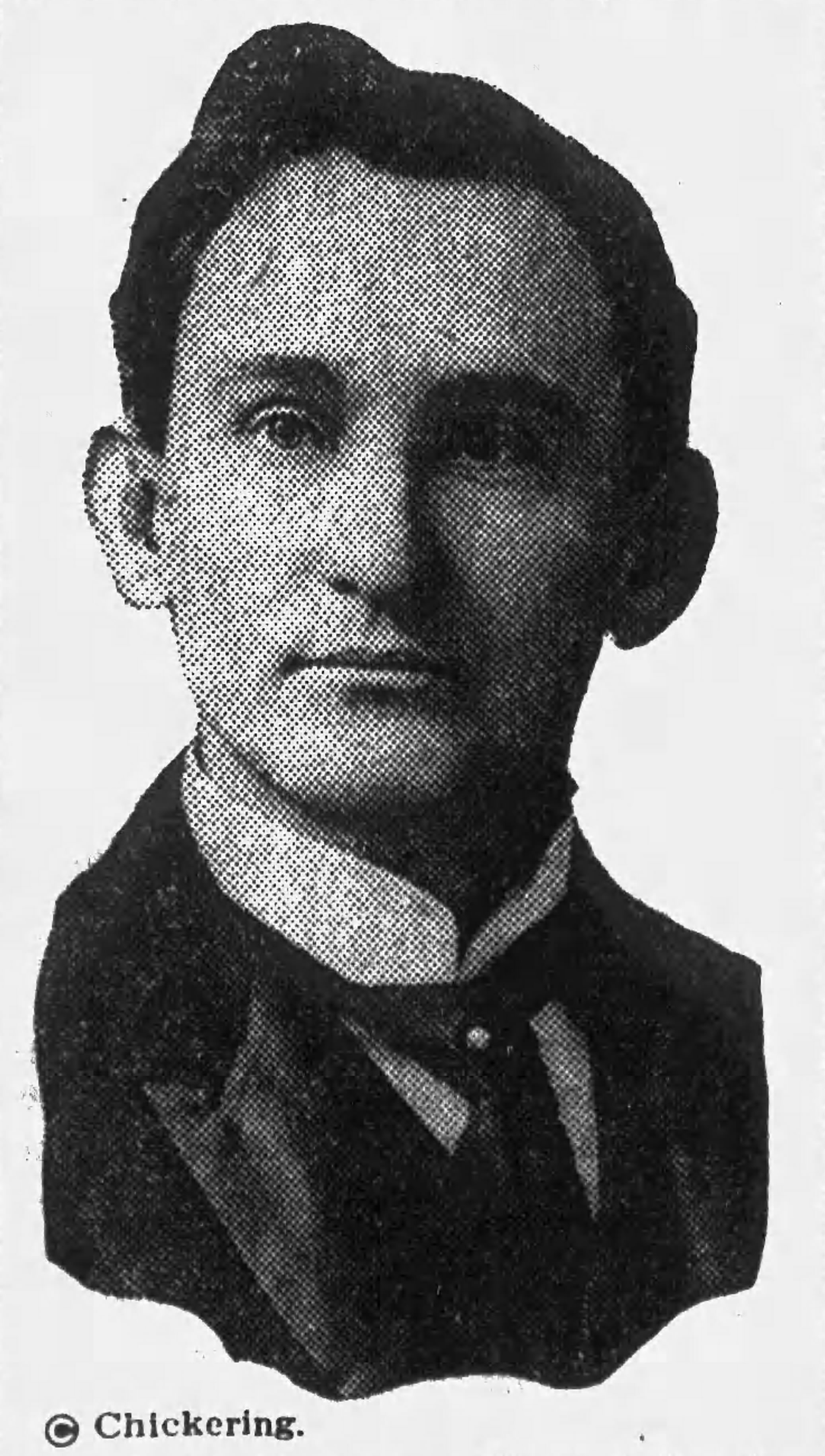
Robinson c. 1913

In 1894 Robinson was elected to the Arkansas Legislature and served one term. He was elected to the United States House of Representatives in 1902 from the Sixth District of Arkansas, and was re-elected to four subsequent terms, serving until 1913.

Robinson was a presidential elector in 1900.

In 1912, Robinson was elected governor of Arkansas. He resigned his U.S. House seat on January 14, 1913, and took office as governor on January 16. However, U.S. Senator Jefferson Davis had died on January 3, after the legislature had re-elected him to a new term beginning March 4, 1913; his seat was now open. On January 27, 1913, only 12 days after Robinson took office as governor, the legislature elected him to the U.S. Senate to replace Davis.

Robinson became the last U.S. Senator elected by a state legislature rather than by direct popular vote. The Seventeenth Amendment, which required direct election, took effect on April 8, 1913. All the other senators elected to terms starting in 1913 had been elected earlier; Senator James H. Brady of Idaho was elected to fill a vacancy on January 24; he was next to last.

Robinson resigned as governor on March 8, 1913. Although he served as governor for only 55 days, he worked to provide funds to complete the new state capitol building, create a labor statistics board, adopt an official state flag, and create the Arkansas State Highway Commission.

A self-described liberal, Robinson was a supporter of progressive legislation during his lifetime, as demonstrated in a 1911 speech when he voiced his support for measures such as an eight-hour workday and pensions for old disabled workers.

=== U.S. Senate ===
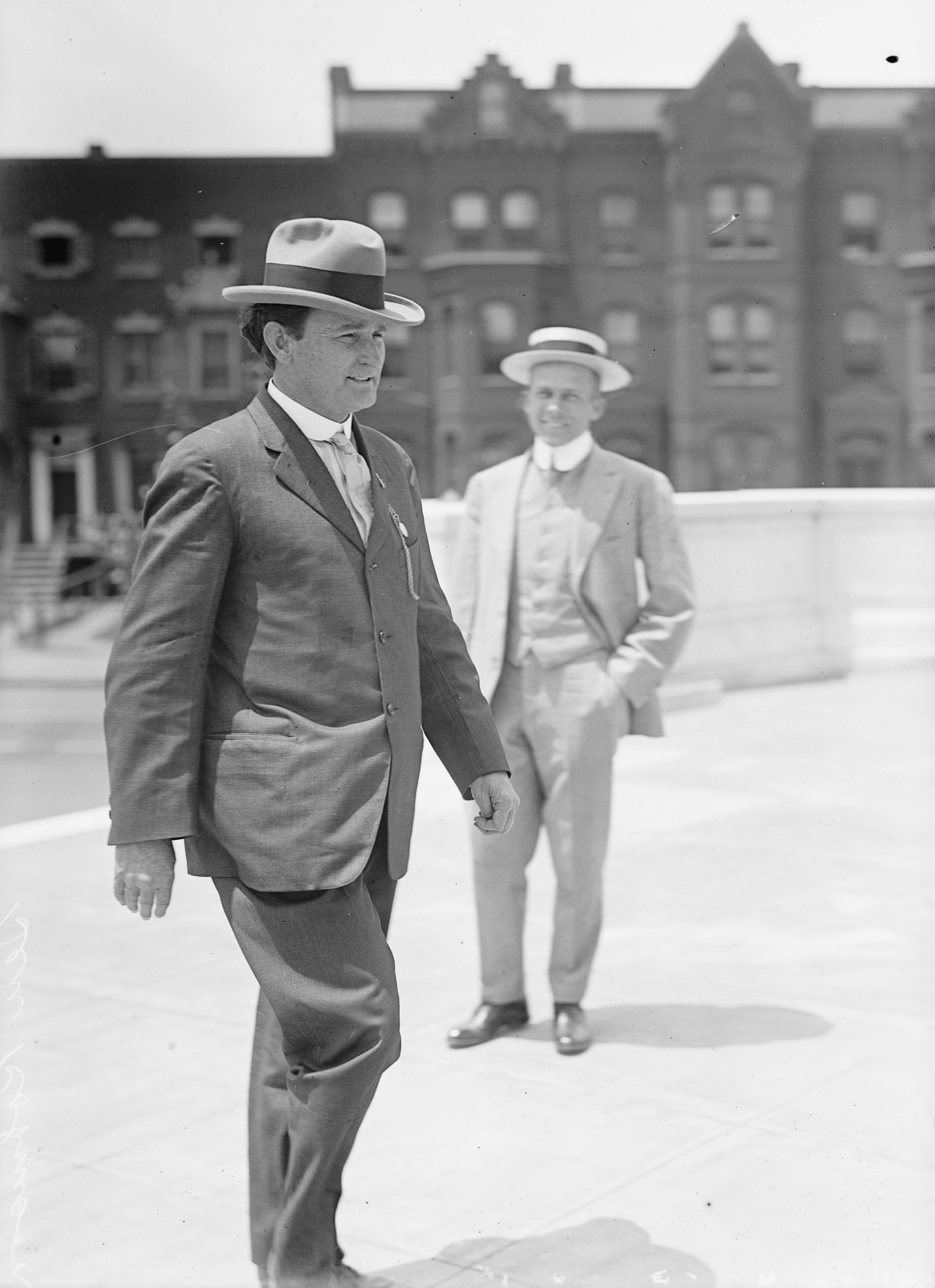
Robinson (left) in 1913

He staunchly supported the policies of President Woodrow Wilson even as other Democrats faltered. He championed the Keating-Owen Child Labor Act and worked to enact bills to regulate railroads and other key industries. He led the Senate to arm merchant ships and voted to declare war on Germany. He also led the unsuccessful effort in the Senate to ratify the Treaty of Versailles.

Robinson was regarded as a progressive in Woodrow Wilson's image. Robinson gained influence in the Senate and later served as Chairman of the 1920 Democratic National Convention. Robinson was re-elected to the Senate in 1918, 1924, 1930, and 1936. In 1923, the Senate Democratic leader Oscar Underwood, who served as the Senate Minority Leader, resigned due to illness. Senior Democratic Senator Furnifold Simmons was expected to take Underwood's place, but withdrew his name from consideration after Robinson challenged him for the position. By unanimous acclamation, Robinson became the Democratic leader, a position he would hold until his death in 1937.

As minority leader, Robinson took over the distribution of patronage appointments and reformed the committee assignment process, decreeing that no senator would hold the top Democratic position in more than one important committee. A Capitol Hill resident, he never strayed far from the Senate chamber, but kept a constant watch over the proceedings in order to capitalize on any dissension within the Republican ranks. Known as a "horse trader," he made deals on both sides of the aisle and helped facilitate negotiations with the era's GOP presidents.

Robinson had presidential aspirations of his own. In 1924, he was a minor contender for the Democratic nomination. A "favorite son" candidate, he drew the support of his Arkansas constituents and the southern conservative members of his party. That year, however, his performance on a golf course brought him more attention than his short-lived race for the presidency. At the Chevy Chase Country Club (a favorite haunt for Washington politicians), a fellow golfer asked to move ahead of the senator's slow-playing foursome. Robinson refused to extend the courtesy to the local surgeon. After a few angry words, he hit the doctor, knocking him to the ground. The club expelled Robinson from its membership, and the press gave him a new title; he was now the "pugilist" senator.

==== Majority leader ====
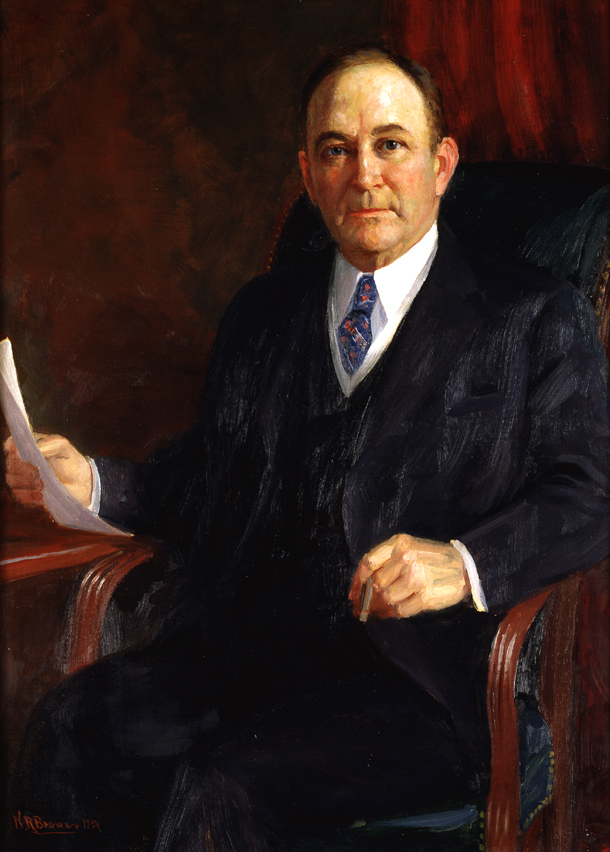
Robinson's official Senate portrait, 1934

Robinson became Senate Majority Leader by unanimous vote in 1933 when the Democrats became the majority. He was the first Democrat to serve as formally designated Majority Leader. He took his duties seriously, refusing to delegate his numerous responsibilities. Some Senators resented his autocratic style. In debate he could be terrifying. He would grow red in the face, pound his desk, gesture wildly, and stamp his feet. As Franklin Roosevelt's New Deal "marshal," he ensured the passage of countless bills relating to the Depression and social policy, his most impressive victory being the Emergency Banking Act, which he pushed through both houses of Congress in seven hours.

Richard L. Riedel, a Senate press gallery attendant in the 1920s and 1930s, recalled, "When [Robinson] would go into one of his rages, it took little imagination to see fire and smoke rolling out of his mouth like some fierce dragon. Even when he kidded me, he spoke in loud gasps while puffing his cigar. Robinson could make Senators and everyone in his presence quake by the burning fire of his eyes, the baring of his teeth as he ground out the words, and the clenching of his mighty fists as he beat on the desk before him."

The press referred to him as "scrappy Joe", and he nearly fought with Senate colleagues Robert M. La Follette, Porter J. McCumber, James Thomas Heflin, and Huey Long. Once the United States entered World War I, Robinson denounced those senators who opposed the war effort. After La Follette opposed it, Robinson questioned his patriotism on the Senate floor and La Follette almost got into a brawl with Robinson and had to be restrained. His response to a guard who questioned his credentials at the 1920 Democratic National Convention was a punch in the face. Despite this temper, he maintained strong friendships across party lines.

==== Court-packing proposal ====
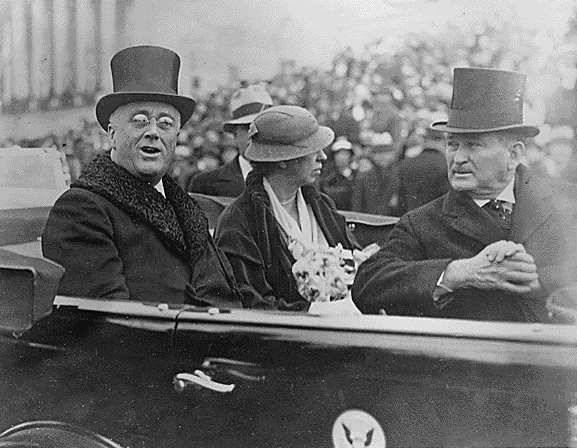
Franklin D. Roosevelt, Eleanor Roosevelt and Joseph Robinson in Washington D.C, 1933

In 1937, Robinson supported Roosevelt's proposal to restructure the United States Supreme Court (the "court-packing plan"). This support may have occurred in part due to Roosevelt promising Robinson the next appointment to the Supreme Court. Robinson himself was critical of the Court for having, as he saw it "delayed recovery," together with its invalidation of a New York minimum wage law (a decision that the Court later reversed). Robinson had a much more difficult time with the president's Reorganization Act of 1939, designed to add liberal justices to the Supreme Court. For weeks in 1937, he spoke, fought, and cajoled for the bill, but he could not stifle the criticism of scores of Republicans and Democrats.

=== 1928 presidential election ===
Robinson was the Democratic nominee for vice president in 1928, as the running mate of Alfred E. Smith. Early in 1928, Robinson clashed with Senator James Thomas Heflin, a Democrat from Alabama, who frequently inserted anti-Catholic sentiments into many of his speeches. When New York's Catholic governor, Alfred E. Smith, announced his candidacy for president, Heflin made Smith the target of his criticism. Robinson admonished Heflin's views, stating that religious affiliation had no bearing on a person's credentials for higher office. On one famous occasion, he declared, "I have heard [the senator] denounce the Catholic Church and the Pope of Rome and the cardinal and the bishop and the priest and the nun until I am sick and tired of it, as a Democrat." Helfin retorted, "The Senator from Arkansas can not remain leader of the Democrats and fight the Roman Catholics' battle every time the issue is raised in this body." Interpreting the remark as a challenge to his authority, Robinson held a vote of confidence to gauge his colleagues' loyalty. By a near unanimous vote (Heflin was absent), the senators pledged their support to their leader and his stance against bigotry.

Though Smith lost to Republican nominee Herbert Hoover, Robinson emerged from the campaign a national figure, now known for the impassioned speeches he had made around the country on behalf of Smith and the Democratic platform. He continued to score victories as the Senate's minority leader, but his cooperative relationship with Hoover riled the members of his party. They understood that no other senator possessed Robinson's tenacity and influence, however, so they accepted his leadership, infuriating as it could be.

== Death ==
On July 2, 1937, Robinson was the leading advocate for Roosevelt's court-packing bill when it was being debated. On July 12, he left the Senate chamber complaining of chest pains. Two days later, Robinson died of heart failure. Two days after Robinson's sudden death, colleagues, friends, and family attended his funeral in the Senate chamber. This funeral was reported to be a state funeral. The Senate chaplain gave a brief sermon, and the United States Capitol Police escorted his body to a funeral train headed to Little Rock. Thousands of mourners traveled to the Arkansas capitol to witness Robinson's lying-in-state ceremony and to express their grief and their enormous admiration for the majority leader: the "fightingest" man in the U.S. Senate.

In a tribute to Robinson, President Roosevelt said that

Those who knew Joseph Taylor Robinson best recognized in him the qualities of true liberal thought. Mindful of the needs of underprivileged he was devoted always to improvement of the lot of the masses.

He is buried at the Roselawn Cemetery in Little Rock, Arkansas. His home in Little Rock, the Joseph Taylor Robinson House, was declared a National Historic Landmark in 1994.

== Legacy ==
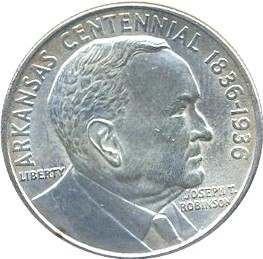
Arkansas–Robinson half dollar

It is accepted that none of Robinson's predecessors would yield the same level of influence as he did while serving as party leader in the Senate, with his strong knowledge of Senate procedures and legislative issues permitting him to have such significant influence.

Robinson is the namesake of Camp Joseph T. Robinson, Arkansas's primary National Guard base; Robinson Center in downtown Little Rock; and elementary, middle and high schools on the northwestern edge of Little Rock.

Robinson's face appears on the reverse of a United States half dollar produced for the 1936 Arkansas Centennial; he was one of only four men to appear on a U.S. coin while living. This was a commemorative issue not intended for regular circulation. A total of 25,265 coins were minted.

Robinson is mentioned in True Grit, a novel by Arkansas writer Charles Portis. In an aside that illustrates the complexities of Southern political allegiances during the relevant period, Portis's narrator Mattie Ross says: "[Grover Cleveland] brought a good deal of misery to the land in the Panic of ’93 but I am not ashamed to own that my family supported him and has stayed with the Democrats right on through, up to and including Governor Alfred Smith, and not only because of Joe Robinson."

== Electoral history ==
U.S. Congressional Election – Arkansas 6th District Results 1902 – 1910
Year	Democratic	PCT	Challenger	Party	Pct
1902	Joseph Taylor Robinson	89.3%	W. H. Carpenter	Republican	10.7%
1904	Joseph Taylor Robinson	62.0%	R. C. Thompson	Republican	38.1%
1906	Joseph Taylor Robinson	84.4%	R. C. Thompson	Republican	15.6%
1908	Joseph Taylor Robinson		Unopposed		
1910	Joseph Taylor Robinson	81.6%	B. C. Thompson	Republican	18.4%

Arkansas Gubernatorial Election Results
Year	Democratic	PCT	Challenger	Party	Pct
1912	Joseph Taylor Robinson	64.7%	Andrew I. Roland	Republican	27.4%

Arkansas U.S. Senatorial Election (Class 2) Results 1918 – 1936
Year	Democratic	PCT	Challenger	Party	Pct
1918	Joseph Taylor Robinson		Unopposed		
1924	Joseph Taylor Robinson	73.5%	Charles F. Cole	Republican	26.5%
1930	Joseph Taylor Robinson		Unopposed		
1936	Joseph Taylor Robinson	81.8%	G.C. Ledbetter	Republican	16.4%

== See also ==
- List of members of the United States Congress who died in office (1900–1949)

== Bibliography ==
- Donald C. Bacon, "Joseph Taylor Robinson: The Good Soldier", in Davidson, Roger H.; Baker, Richard D. (1991). First among equals: outstanding Senate leaders of the twentieth century. Washington, DC: Congressional Quarterly Inc. pp. 63–97. ISBN 0-87187-581-0..
- Riedel, Richard L. (1969). Halls of the Mighty: My 47 Years at the Senate. Washington and New York: Robert B. Luce.

U.S. House of Representatives
Preceded by Stephen Brundidge Jr.	Member of the U.S. House of Representatives from Arkansas's 6th congressional district 1903–1913	Succeeded by Samuel M. Taylor
Party political offices
Preceded by George Washington Donaghey	Democratic nominee for Governor of Arkansas; 1912	Succeeded by George Washington Hays
First	Democratic nominee for U.S. Senator from Arkansas (Class 2); 1918, 1924, 1930, 1936	Succeeded by Carl Edward Bailey
Preceded by Ollie M. James	Permanent Chair of the Democratic National Convention; 1920	Succeeded by Thomas J. Walsh
Preceded by Oscar Underwood	Senate Democratic Leader; 1923–1937	Succeeded by Alben Barkley
Preceded by Thomas J. Walsh	Permanent Chair of the Democratic National Convention; 1928	Succeeded by Thomas J. Walsh
Preceded by Charles W. Bryan	Democratic nominee for Vice President of the United States; 1928	Succeeded by John N. Garner
Preceded by Thomas J. Walsh	Permanent Chair of the Democratic National Convention; 1936	Succeeded by Alben Barkley
Preceded by Alben Barkley	Keynote Speaker of the Democratic National Convention; 1936; Served alongside: Alben Barkley	Succeeded by William B. Bankhead
Political offices
Preceded by George Washington Donaghey	Governor of Arkansas; 1913	Succeeded by William Kavanaugh Oldham; Acting
U.S. Senate
Preceded by William M. Kavanaugh	U.S. Senator (Class 2) from Arkansas; 1913–1937; Served alongside: James Paul Clarke, William F. Kirby, Thaddeus H. Caraway, Hattie Caraway	Succeeded by John E. Miller
Preceded by Oscar Underwood	Senate Minority Leader; 1923–1933	Succeeded by Charles L. McNary
Preceded by George H. Moses	Chair of the Joint Inaugural Ceremonies Committee; 1932–1933	Succeeded by Matthew M. Neely
Preceded by James Eli Watson	Senate Majority Leader; 1933–1937	Succeeded by Alben Barkley
