= 1972 United States Senate election in Arkansas =

- November 7, 1972
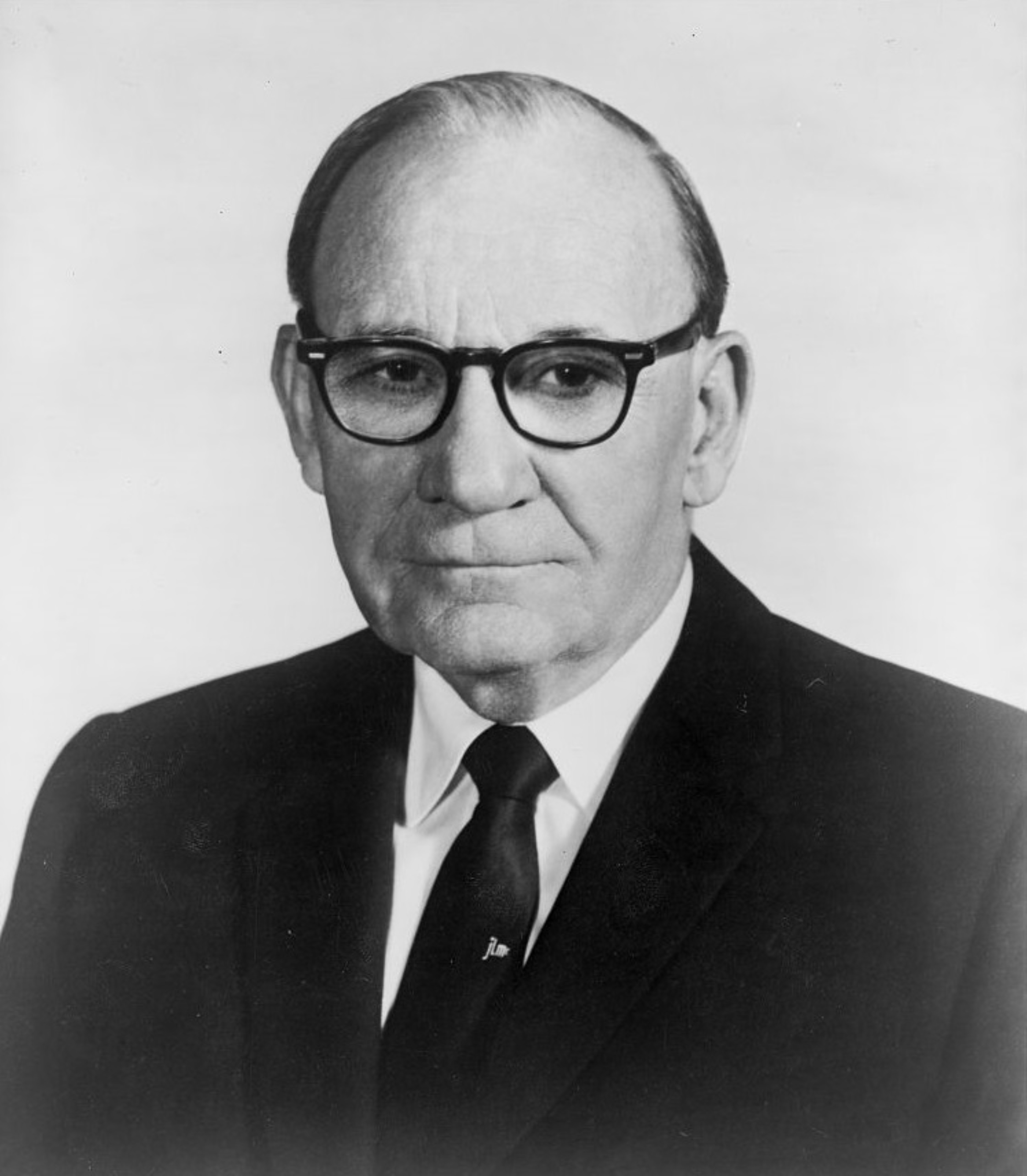

Nominee	John L. McClellan	Wayne Babbitt
Party	Democratic	Republican
Popular vote	386,398	248,238
Percentage	60.88%	39.12%
- County results McClellan: 50–60% 60–70% 70–80% Babbitt: 50–60%
U.S. senator before election
John L. McClellan
Democratic
Elected U.S. Senator
John L. McClellan
Democratic

The 1972 United States Senate election in Arkansas took place on November 7, 1972. Incumbent U.S. Senator John L. McClellan was re-elected to a sixth term in office, defeating U.S. Representative David Pryor in a hotly contested primary. In the general election, McClellan easily defeated Republican physician Wayne Babbitt. This was McClellan's final campaign; he died in his sleep in 1977. Pryor was elected governor of Arkansas in 1974 and won the race to succeed McClellan in 1978.

This would also mark the last time a Democrat was elected to this seat who was not a member of the Pryor family.

Arkansas was one of fifteen states, alongside Alabama, Colorado, Delaware, Georgia, Iowa, Louisiana, Maine, Minnesota, Mississippi, Montana, New Hampshire, Rhode Island, South Dakota and West Virginia, that were won by Republican President Richard Nixon in 1972 that elected Democrats to the United States Senate.

== Democratic primary ==
=== Candidates ===
- Ted Boswell
- Foster Johnson
- John L. McClellan, incumbent senator
- David Pryor, U.S. representative from Camden

=== Results ===
1972 Democratic U.S. Senate primary results
Party	Candidate	Votes	%
Democratic	John L. McClellan (inc.)	220,588	44.70%
Democratic	David Pryor	204,058	41.35%
Democratic	Ted Boswell	62,496	12.66%
Democratic	Foster Johnson	6,358	1.29%
Total votes		493,500	100.00%

=== Run-off results ===
Since no candidate received a majority in the initial primary, a run-off election was held on June 13 between McClellan and Pryor.

1972 Democratic U.S. Senate run-off results
Party	Candidate	Votes	%
Democratic	John L. McClellan (inc.)	242,983	52.00%
Democratic	David Pryor	224,262	48.00%
Total votes		467,245	100.00%

== General election ==
=== Results ===
General election results
Party	Candidate	Votes	%	±%
Democratic	John L. McClellan (inc.)	386,398	60.88%	▼39.11
Republican	Wayne H. Babbitt	248,238	39.12%	N/A
Total votes		634,636	0.02%	

== See also ==
- 1972 United States Senate elections
