= John L. McClellan =

American lawyer and politician (1896-1977)

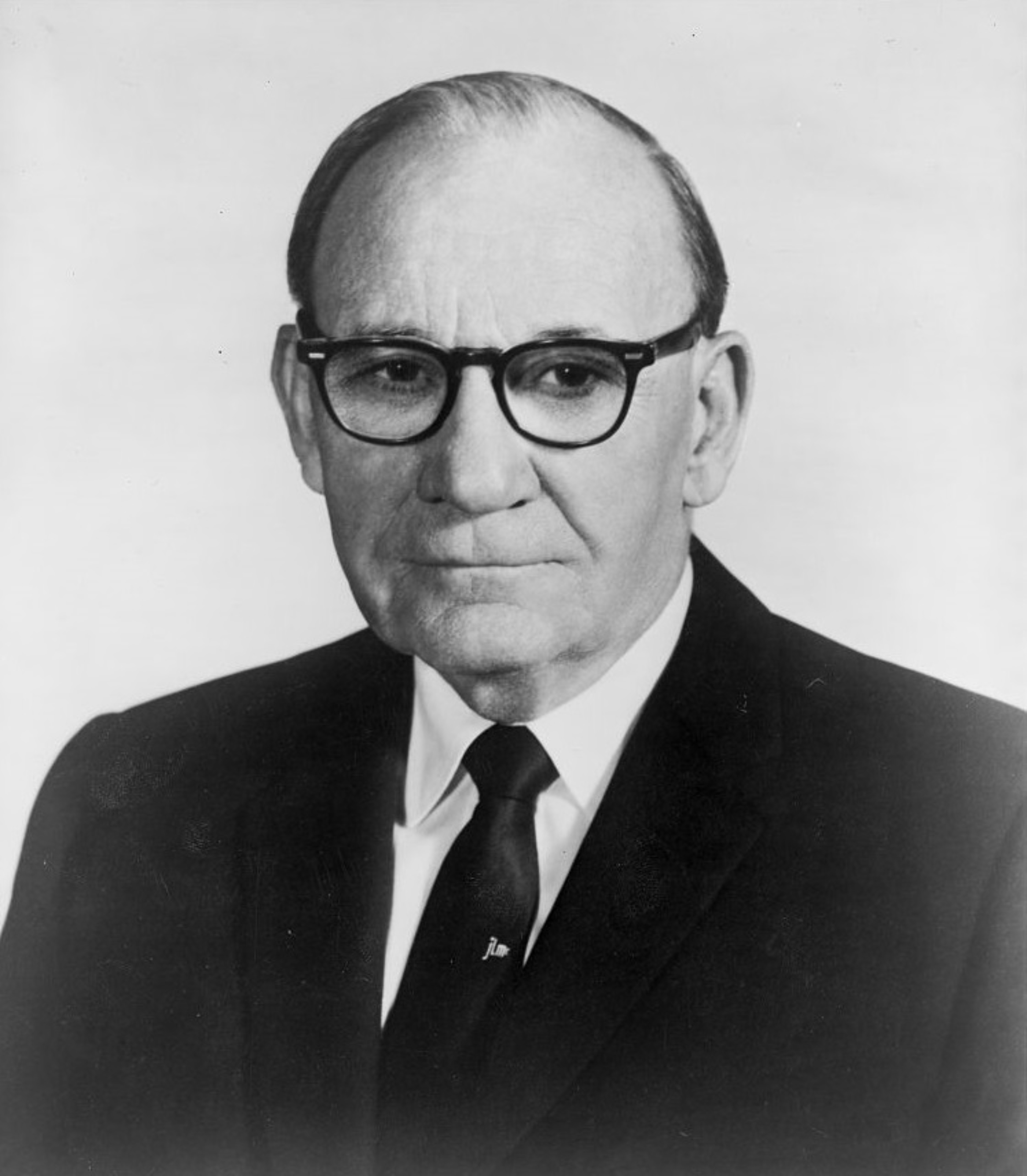
- McClellan in 1970

United States Senator from Arkansas
- In office January 3, 1943 – November 28, 1977
- Preceded by: Lloyd Spencer
- Succeeded by: Kaneaster Hodges Jr.
Committee positions
Chair of the Senate Appropriations Committee
In office July 28, 1972 – November 28, 1977
| Preceded by | Allen Ellender |
| Succeeded by | Warren Magnuson |
Chair of the Senate Government Operations Committee
In office January 3, 1955 – July 28, 1972
| Preceded by | Joseph McCarthy |
| Succeeded by | Sam Ervin |
In office January 3, 1949 – January 3, 1953
| Preceded by | George Aiken |
| Succeeded by | Joseph McCarthy |
Ranking Member of the Senate Government Operations Committee
In office January 3, 1953 – January 3, 1955
| Preceded by | Joseph McCarthy |
| Succeeded by | Joseph McCarthy |
In office January 3, 1947 – January 3, 1949
| Preceded by | George Aiken |
| Succeeded by | Joseph McCarthy |

Member of the U.S. House of Representatives from Arkansas's 6th district
- In office January 3, 1935 – January 3, 1939
- Preceded by: David D. Glover
- Succeeded by: William F. Norrell

Personal details
- Born: John Little McClellan; February 25, 1896 Sheridan, Arkansas, U.S.
- Died: November 28, 1977 (aged 81) Little Rock, Arkansas, U.S.
- Party: Democratic
- Spouses: Eula Hicks (m. 1913; div. 1921) Lucille Smith (m. 1922; died 1935) Norma Myers (m. 1937)
- Children: 5

Military service
- Branch/service: United States Army
- Years of service: 1917–1919
- Rank: First Lieutenant
- Unit: Signal Corps
- Battles/wars: World War I

John Little McClellan (February 25, 1896 – November 28, 1977) was an American lawyer and segregationist politician. A member of the Democratic Party, he served as a U.S. representative (1935–1939) and a U.S. senator (1943–1977) from Arkansas.

At the time of his death, he was the second most senior member of the Senate and chairman of the Senate Appropriations Committee. He is the longest-serving senator in Arkansas history.

== Early life and career ==
John Little McClellan was born on a farm near Sheridan, Arkansas to Isaac Scott and Belle (née Suddeth) McClellan. His parents, who were strong Democrats, named him after John Sebastian Little, who served as a U.S. Representative (1894–1907) and Governor of Arkansas (1907). His mother died only months after his birth, and he received his early education at local public schools. At age 12, after graduating from Sheridan High School, he began studying law in his father's office.

He was admitted to the state bar in 1913, when he was only 17, after the Arkansas General Assembly approved a special act waiving the normal age requirement for certification as a lawyer. As the youngest attorney in the United States, he practiced law with his father in Sheridan. Also in 1913, McClellan married Eula Hicks; the couple had two children, and divorced in 1921.

During World War I, he served in the U.S. Army as a first lieutenant in the aviation section of the Signal Corps from 1917 to 1919. Following his military service, he moved to Malvern, where he opened a law office and served as city attorney (1920–26).

In 1922, he married Lucille Smith, to whom he remained married until her death in 1935; they had three children. He was prosecuting attorney of the seventh judicial district of Arkansas from 1927 to 1930.

== U.S. House of Representatives ==
In 1934, McClellan was elected as a Democrat to the U.S. House of Representatives from Arkansas's 6th congressional district. He was re-elected to the House in 1936. In March of that year, he condemned CBS for airing a speech by Communist leader Earl Browder, which he described as "nothing less than treason."

During his tenure in the House, he voted against President Franklin D. Roosevelt's court-packing plan, the Gavagan anti-lynching bill, and the Reorganization Act of 1937. In 1937, he wed for the third and final time, marrying Norma Myers Cheatham.

In 1938, McClellan unsuccessfully challenged first-term incumbent Hattie Caraway for the Democratic nomination for the United States Senate. During the campaign, he criticized Caraway for her support for the 1937 Reorganization Act and accused her of having "improper influence" over federal employees in Arkansas. Nevertheless, he was defeated in the primary election by a margin of about 8,000 votes. He subsequently resumed the practice of law in Camden, where he joined the firm Gaughan, McClellan and Gaughan. He served as a delegate to the Democratic National Convention in 1940 (Chicago), 1944 (Chicago), and 1948 (Philadelphia).

== U.S. Senate ==
McClellan in 1943

In 1942, after G. Lloyd Spencer decided not to seek re-election, McClellan ran for the Senate again and this time won. He served as U.S. Senator from Arkansas from 1943 to 1977, when he died in office. During his tenure, he served as chairman of the Appropriations Committee and served 22 years as chairman of the Committee on Government Operations. McClellan was the longest serving United States Senator in Arkansas history. During the later part of his Senate service, Arkansas had, perhaps, the most powerful congressional delegation with McClellan as chairman of the Senate Appropriations Committee, J. William Fulbright as chairman of the Senate Foreign Relations Committee, Wilbur Mills as chairman of the House Ways and Means Committee, Oren Harris as chairman of the House Commerce Committee, Ezekiel C. "Took" Gathings as chairman of the House Agriculture Committee, and James William Trimble as a member of the powerful House Rules Committee.

McClellan also served for eighteen years as chairman of the Senate Permanent Subcommittee on Investigations (1955–1973) and continued the hearings into subversive activities at the U.S. Army Signal Corps, Fort Monmouth, New Jersey, where Soviet spies Julius Rosenberg, Al Sarant and Joel Barr all worked in the 1940s. He was a participant in the famous Army-McCarthy Hearings and led a Democratic walkout of that subcommittee in protest of Senator Joseph McCarthy's conduct in those hearings. McClellan appeared in the 2005 movie Good Night, and Good Luck in footage from the actual hearings.

He led two other investigations, both televised, uncovering law-breaking and corruption. The first of these, under the United States Senate Select Committee on Improper Activities in Labor and Management, also known as the McClellan Committee, investigated union corruption and centered on Jimmy Hoffa and lasted from January 1957 to March 1960. In April 1961, during an Investigations subcommittee hearing, contractor Henry Gable asserted that Communists would not be able to do the same amount of damage to the American missile effort as done by labor at Cape Canaveral. McClellan suggested that the comments bordered on accusations of subversion and called for more testimony from the unions.

The second televised major investigation led by McClellan was in 1964 and known as the Valachi hearings. These hearings investigated the operations of organized crime and featured the testimony of Joseph Valachi, the first American mafia figure to testify about its criminal activities. McClellan continued his efforts against organized crime (including backing the anti-organized-crime (RICO) law) until 1973, when he switched to investigating political subversion. During this period, he hired Robert F. Kennedy as chief counsel and vaulted him into the national spotlight. McClellan investigated numerous cases of government corruption including numerous defense contractors and Texas financier Billie Sol Estes.

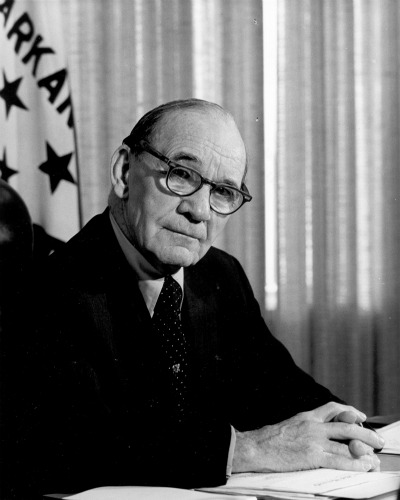
Senator John L. McClellan

In 1957, McClellan opposed U.S. President Dwight D. Eisenhower's decision to send federal troops to enforce the desegregation of Central High School in Little Rock. Prior to the sending of the troops under the command of Major General Edwin A. Walker, McClellan had expressed "regret [regarding] the ... use of force by the federal government to enforce integration. I believe it to be without authority of law. I am very apprehensive that such action may precipitate more trouble than it will prevent."

McClellan and fellow Senator Robert S. Kerr of Oklahoma were the sponsors of the bill that authorized construction of the McClellan-Kerr Arkansas River Navigation System, maintained by the Army Corps of Engineers. The system transformed the often shallow and sometimes dry Arkansas River into a major transportation route and water source.

Although his Select Committee on Improper Activities in Labor and Management already had been dissolved by 1960, McClellan began a related three-year investigation in 1963, through the Permanent Subcommittee on Investigations, into the union benefit plans of labor leader George Barasch, alleging misuse and diversion of $4,000,000 of benefit funds.

McClellan's notable failure to find any legal wrongdoing led to his introduction of several pieces of new legislation including his own bill on October 12, 1965 setting new fiduciary standards for plan trustees. Senator Jacob K. Javits (R-NY) introduced bills in 1965 and 1967 increasing regulation on welfare and pension funds to limit the control of plan trustees and administrators. Provisions from all three bills ultimately evolved into the guidelines enacted in the Employee Retirement Income Security Act of 1974 (ERISA).

In 1977, McClellan was one of five Democrats to vote against the nomination of F. Ray Marshall as United States Secretary of Labor.

== Personal life ==
McClellan's second wife died of spinal meningitis in 1935 and his son Max died of the same disease in 1943 while serving in Africa during World War II. His son, John L. Jr., died in 1949 in an automobile accident, and his son James H. died in a plane crash in 1958. Both men were members of the Xi chapter of Kappa Sigma fraternity at the University of Arkansas. To honor their two fallen brothers, the Chapter initiated Senator McClellan into Kappa Sigma in 1965.

McClellan died in his sleep on November 28, 1977, in Little Rock, Arkansas, following surgery to implant a pacemaker. He was buried at Roselawn Memorial Park in Little Rock. A VA Hospital in Little Rock is named in his honor. A chapter of the Delta Theta Phi Law Fraternity at the University of Arkansas at Little Rock Bowen School of Law is named in his honor. Ouachita Baptist University is the repository for his official papers.

== See also ==
- List of members of the United States Congress who died in office (1950–1999)

Party political offices
| Preceded by Carl E. Bailey | Democratic nominee for U.S. Senator from Arkansas (Class 2); 1942, 1948, 1954, 1960, 1966, 1972 | Succeeded by David Pryor |
U.S. Senate
| Preceded by G. Lloyd Spencer | U.S. senator (Class 2) from Arkansas; 1943–1977; Served alongside: Hattie Caraway, J. William Fulbright, Dale Bumpers | Succeeded by Kaneaster Hodges, Jr. |
Political offices
| Preceded by George Aiken | Chairman of Senate Government Operations Committee; 1949–1953 | Succeeded by Joseph McCarthy |
| Preceded by Joseph McCarthy | Chairman of Senate Government Operations Committee; 1955–1972 | Succeeded by Sam Ervin |
| Preceded by Allen J. Ellender | Chairman of Senate Appropriations Committee; 1972–1977 | Succeeded by Warren G. Magnuson |
Honorary titles
| Preceded by George Aiken | Dean of the United States Senate; January 3, 1975 – November 28, 1977; Served alongside: James Eastland | Succeeded by James Eastland |
| Preceded by George Aiken | Oldest United States Senator; January 3, 1975 – November 28, 1977 | Succeeded by Milton Young |
U.S. House of Representatives
| Preceded by David Delano Glover | Member of the U.S. House of Representatives from Arkansas's 6th congressional district 1935–1939 | Succeeded by William F. Norrell |
