= Pettus, Arkansas =

- Unincorporated community
- Location within Arkansas Location within the United States
- Coordinates: 34°40′38″N 91°54′46″W
- Country: United States
- State: Arkansas
- County: Lonoke
- Elevation: 230 ft (70 m)
- Time zone: UTC-6 (Central (CST))
  - Summer (DST): UTC-5 (CDT)
- Area code: 501
- GNIS feature ID: 57155

Pettus is an unincorporated community in Lonoke County, Arkansas, United States.
