= Senator Caraway =

Senator Caraway may refer to:

- Hattie Wyatt Caraway (1878–1950), U.S. Senator from Arkansas from 1931 to 1945
- Thaddeus H. Caraway (1871–1931), U.S. Senator from Arkansas from 1921 to 1931
