= 1932 United States Senate election in Arkansas =

1932 U.S. Senate election in Arkansas
- November 8, 1932
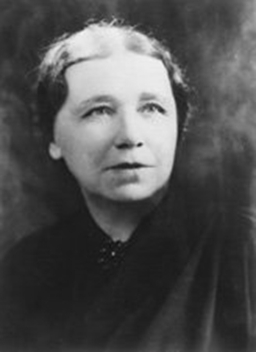

| Nominee | Hattie Caraway | John H. White |
| Party | Democratic | Republican |
| Popular vote | 187,994 | 21,558 |
| Percentage | 89.71% | 10.29% |
- County results Caraway: 50–60% 70–80% 80–90% >90% White: 50–60%
U.S. senator before election
Hattie Caraway
Democratic
Elected U.S. Senator
Hattie Caraway
Democratic

The 1932 United States Senate election in Arkansas took place on November 8, 1932. Incumbent Senator Hattie Caraway, who had been appointed to succeed her late husband Thaddeus H. Caraway in 1931 and won a special election to complete his term in January, ran for a full term in office.

In winning, Caraway became the first woman ever elected to a full term in the United States Senate.

== Background ==
Incumbent U.S. Senator Thaddeus H. Caraway died in office on November 6, 1931. Governor of Arkansas Harvey Parnell appointed Caraway's widow, Hattie, to fill the vacant seat until a successor could be duly elected. The special election to complete the unexpired term was held in January, and Hattie Caraway won against only nominal opposition.

== Democratic primary ==
=== Candidates ===
- O. L. Bodenhamer, former national commander of The American Legion (1929–30)
- Charles H. Brough, former governor of Arkansas (1917–21)
- Hattie Caraway, incumbent U.S. Senator
- William G. Hutton, former Sheriff of Pulaski County
- William F. Kirby, former U.S. Senator (1916–21)
- Melbourne M. Martin
- Vincent M. Miles, former member of the Democratic National Committee (1921–29)

=== Campaign ===
In May 1932, Vice President Charles Curtis invited Senator Caraway to preside over the Senate, making her the first woman to do so. She took advantage of the opportunity to announce that she would run for reelection, surprising Arkansas politicians by joining a field already crowded with prominent candidates who had assumed she would step aside. She told reporters, "The time has passed when a woman should be placed in a position and kept there only while someone else is being groomed for the job."

Senator Huey Long of neighboring Louisiana traveled to Arkansas on a seven-day campaign swing on Caraway's behalf just before the primary. Caraway supported Long's efforts to limit income inequality and increase poverty aid. Long was also motivated by personal sympathy for the widow and his ambition to extend his influence into the home state of his party rival, Senator Joseph Robinson.

Long later recalled his campaign methods on behalf of Caraway:

Mrs. Caraway would never forget nor cease to laugh over the plans we made for caring for obstreperous infants in the audience so that their mothers might listen to the speeches without the crowds being disturbed. I remember when I saw her notice one of our campaigners take charge of the first baby. The child began fretting and then began to cry. One of the young men accompanying us immediately gave it a drink of water. The child quieted for a bit and resumed a whimper, whereupon the same campaign worker handed the baby an all-day sucker, which it immediately grasped and soon fell asleep. Mrs. Caraway did not understand that it was a matter of design until it had been repeated several times.

=== Endorsements ===
Hattie Caraway

Federal officials

- Huey Long, U.S. Senator from Louisiana

=== Results ===
1932 Democratic U.S. Senate primary
| Party | Candidate | Votes | % |
|---|---|---|---|
| Democratic | Hattie Caraway (incumbent) | 127,702 | 44.73% |
| Democratic | O. L. Bodenhamer | 63,858 | 22.37% |
| Democratic | Vincent M. Miles | 30,423 | 10.66% |
| Democratic | Charles H. Brough | 26,207 | 9.18% |
| Democratic | William F. Kirby | 21,448 | 7.51% |
| Democratic | W. G. Hutton | 8,922 | 3.13% |
| Democratic | Melbourne M. Martin | 6,961 | 2.44% |
| Total votes | | 285,521 | 100.00% |

== General election ==
=== Results ===
1932 U.S. Senate election in Arkansas
| Party | Candidate | Votes | % |
|---|---|---|---|
| Democratic | Hattie Caraway (incumbent) | 187,994 | 89.71% |
| Republican | John H. White | 21,558 | 10.29% |
| Total votes | | 209,552 | 100.00% |

== See also ==
- 1932 United States Senate elections
