= US Sen. Hattie Caraway Gravesite =

- U.S. National Register of Historic Places
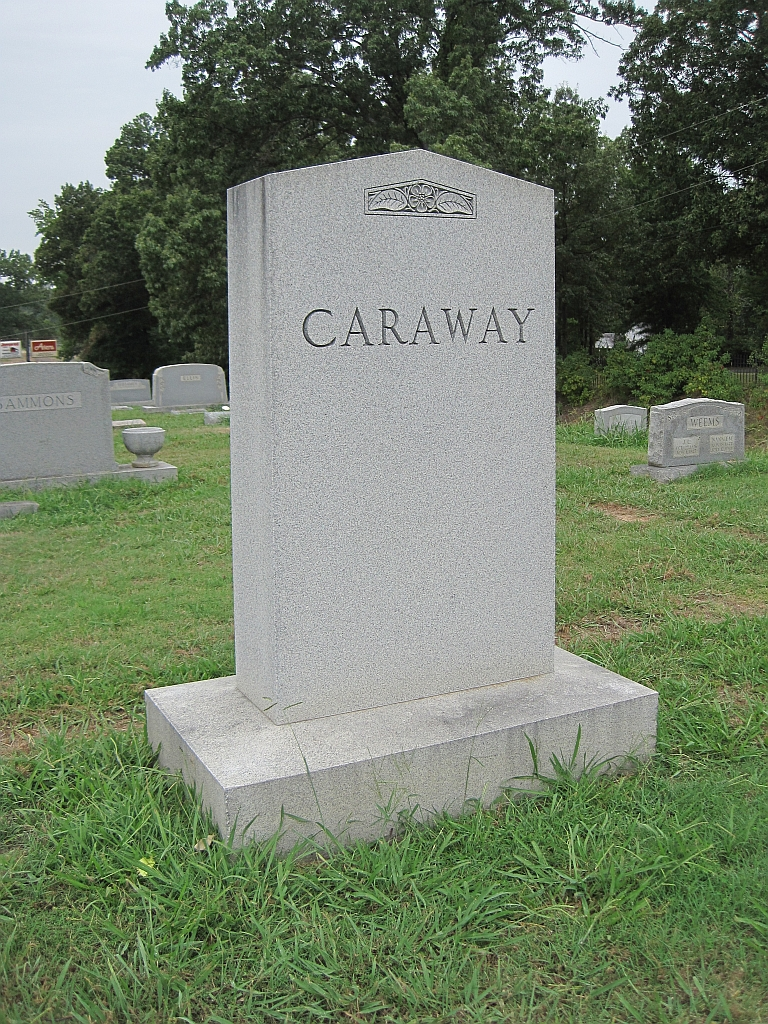

- Location within Arkansas Location within the United States
- Location: Oaklawn Cemetery, 2349 W. Matthews Avenue Lane., Jonesboro, Arkansas
- Coordinates: 35°50′15″N 90°44′20″W
- Area: less than one acre
- Built: 1950
- NRHP reference No.: 07000976
- Added to NRHP: September 20, 2007

The US Sen. Hattie Caraway Gravesite is located in Oaklawn Cemetery on the west side of Jonesboro, Arkansas. It is the only surviving site in Arkansas associated with the life of Hattie Caraway (1878–1950), the first woman to be elected to a full term in the United States Senate. The gravesite consists of a family headstone, simply engraved "Caraway", and three footstones: one for the senator, one for her husband Thaddeus, whom she succeeded in the Senate, and their son Robert. The site is located on the western central edge of the cemetery.

The gravesite was listed on the National Register of Historic Places in 2007.

== See also ==
- National Register of Historic Places listings in Craighead County, Arkansas
