= O. L. Bodenhamer =

National Commander of the American Legion from 1929 to 1930

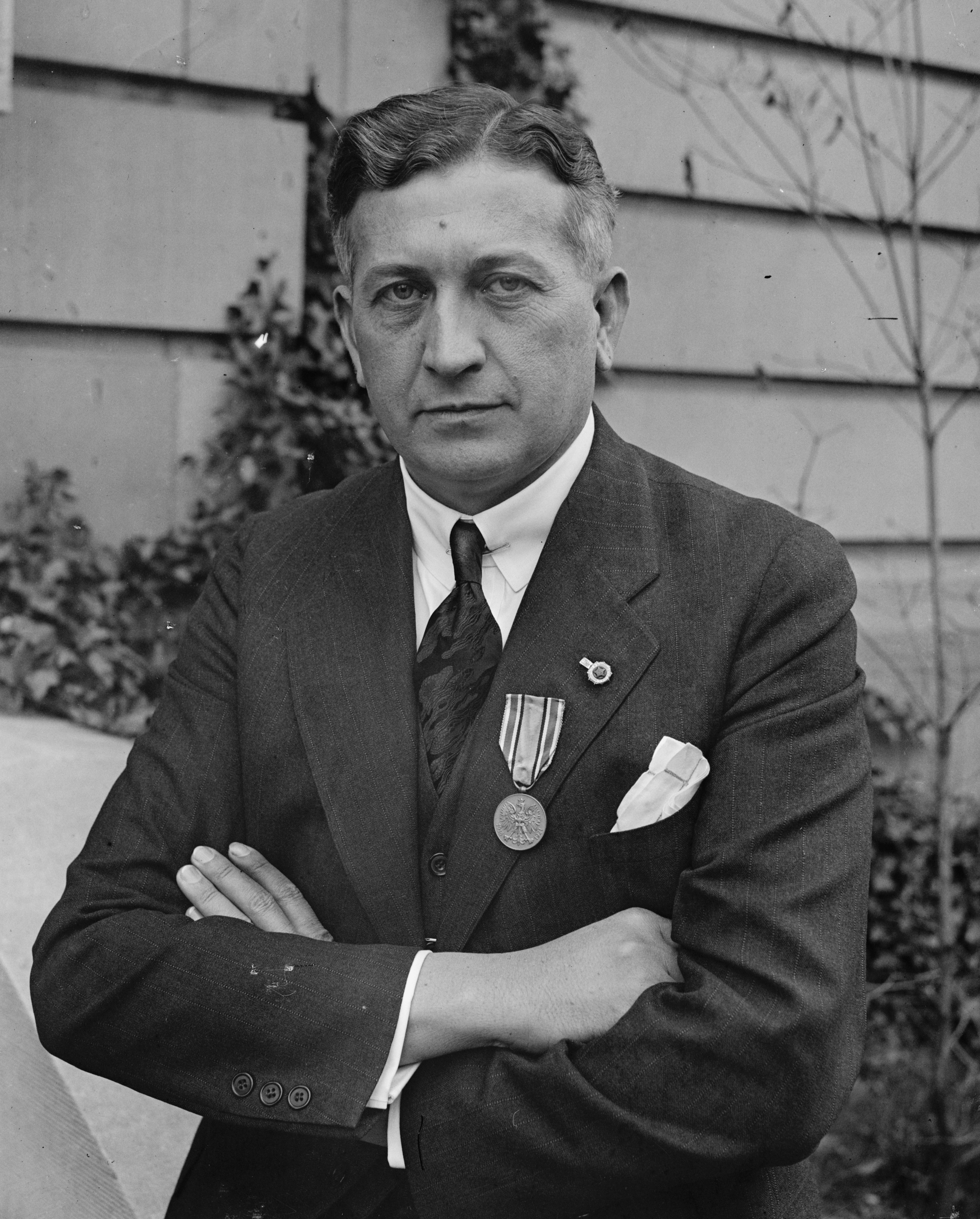
- Bodenhamer in 1929
- Born: Ossee Lee Bodenhamer; June 27, 1891; Goldthwaite, Texas, U.S.
- Died: June 19, 1933 (aged 41); Shreveport, Louisiana, U.S.
- Cause of death: Burns from explosion
- Resting place: Arlington Cemetery, El Dorado, Arkansas, U.S. 33°13′07.0″N 92°39′02.2″W
- Education: Howard Payne University; Baylor University (BA)
- Occupations: Teacher; businessman
- Title: 12th National Commander of The American Legion
- Term: 1929 – 1930
- Predecessor: Paul V. McNutt
- Successor: Ralph T. O'Neil
- Political party: Democratic
- Spouse: Irene Richardson (m. 1930)
- Children: 2
- Parents: John Richard Bodenhamer; Anna Lee Hopkins
- Military service
- Branch: United States Army
- Service years: 1917–1919
- Rank: Major
- Nickname: "Bodie"
- Commands: 3d Battalion, 19th Infantry
- Wars: World War I
- Awards: World War I Victory Medal

Ossee Lee Bodenhamer (June 27, 1891 – June 19, 1933) was an American businessman who served as the 12th national commander of the American Legion from 1929 to 1930.

== Biography ==
Ossee Lee Bodenhamer was born in Goldthwaite, Texas. He graduated from Baylor University with a bachelor's degree in 1914. During World War I, he served in Georgia, Ohio, and Texas as an infantry officer. After the war, Bodenhamer moved to El Dorado, Arkansas, where he established a successful real estate company.

At the 11th national convention in 1929, he was unanimously elected national commander of The American Legion. In 1932, he unsuccessfully sought the Democratic nomination for the U.S. Senate, losing in the primary election to Hattie Caraway. He died in Shreveport, Louisiana, on June 19, 1933.

== Honors ==
- Doctor of Laws (honoris causa), Baylor University, 1930

== See also ==
- List of Baylor University people
- List of Liberty ships

== Notes ==
Non-profit organization positions
Preceded by Paul V. McNutt	National Commander of the American Legion; 1929–1930	Succeeded by Ralph T. O'Neil
