= J. William Fulbright =

American politician (1905–1995)

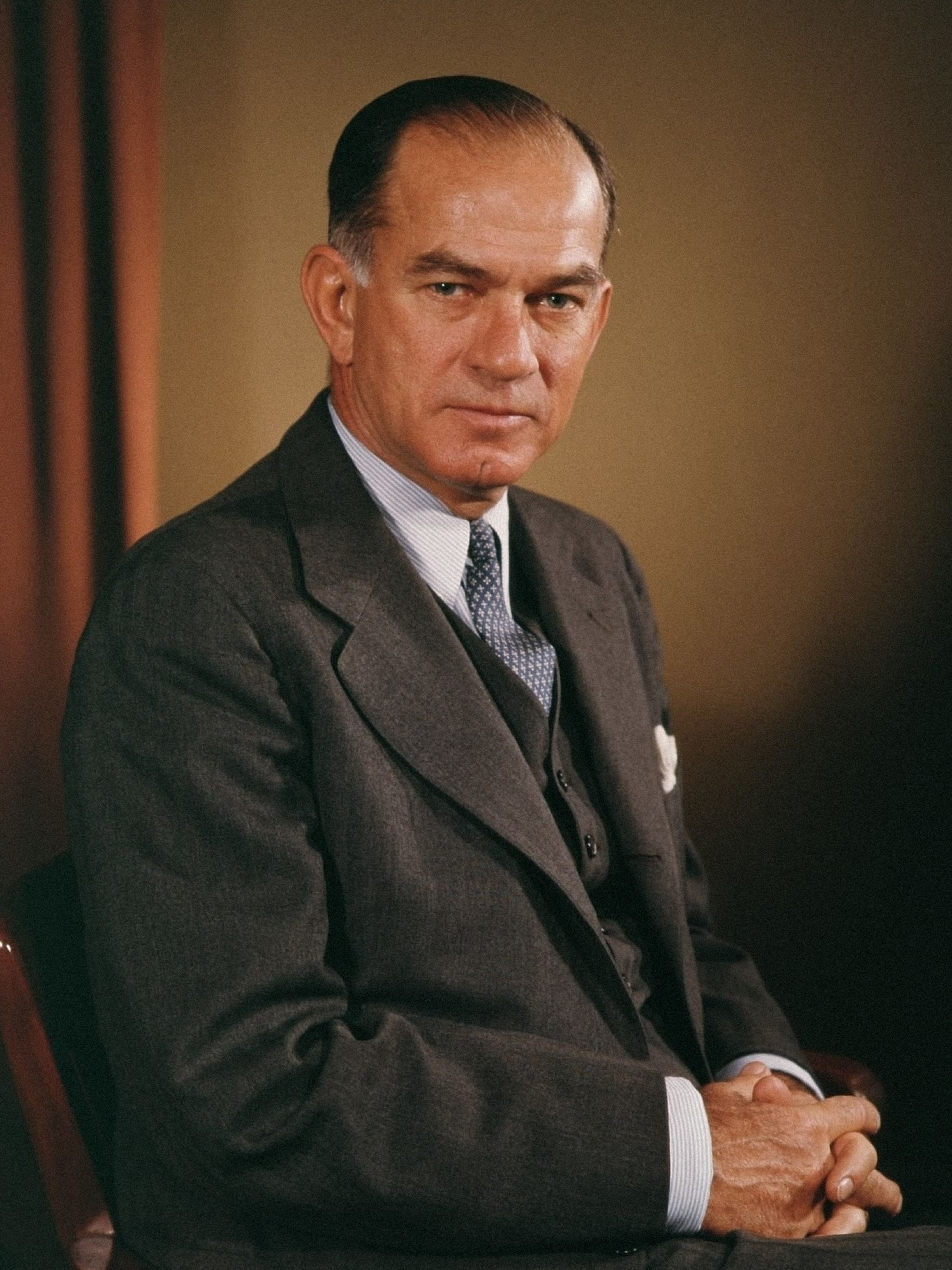
- Official portrait, 1960

United States Senator from Arkansas
- In office January 3, 1945 – December 31, 1974
- Preceded by: Hattie Caraway
- Succeeded by: Dale Bumpers
Senate positions
Chair of the Senate Foreign Relations Committee
In office January 3, 1959 – December 31, 1974
Preceded by	Theodore Green
Succeeded by	John Sparkman
Chair of the Senate Banking Committee
In office January 3, 1955 – January 3, 1959
Preceded by	Homer Capehart
Succeeded by	Willis Robertson
Ranking Member of the Senate Banking Committee
In office September 1, 1954 – January 3, 1955
Preceded by	Burnet Maybank
Succeeded by	Homer Capehart

Member of the U.S. House of Representatives from Arkansas's 3rd district
- In office January 3, 1943 – January 3, 1945
- Preceded by: Clyde T. Ellis
- Succeeded by: James William Trimble

President of the University of Arkansas
- In office 1939 – June 1941
- Preceded by: John C. Futrall
- Succeeded by: Arthur M. Harding

Personal details
- Born: James William Fulbright; April 9, 1905 Sumner, Missouri, U.S.
- Died: February 9, 1995 (aged 89) Washington, D.C., U.S.
- Party: Democratic
- Spouses: Elizabeth Kremer Williams (m. 1932; died 1985); Harriet Anna Mayor (m. 1990)
- Education: University of Arkansas (BA); Pembroke College, Oxford (MA); George Washington University (LLB)

James William Fulbright (April 9, 1905 – February 9, 1995) was an American politician, academic, and statesman who served as a United States Senator from Arkansas from 1945 until his resignation in 1974. As of 2023, Fulbright is the longest-serving chairman in the history of the United States Senate Committee on Foreign Relations. A member of the Democratic Party, he is best known for his strong multilateralist positions on international issues, opposition to American involvement in the Vietnam War, and the creation of the international fellowship program bearing his name, the Fulbright Program.

Fulbright was an admirer of Woodrow Wilson and an avowed anglophile. He was an early advocate for American entry into World War II and aid to Great Britain, first as a college professor and then as an elected member of the U.S. House of Representatives, where he authored the Fulbright Resolution expressing support for international peacekeeping initiatives and American entry into the United Nations.

After joining the Senate, Fulbright expressed support for Europeanism and the formation of a federal European union. He envisioned the Cold War as a struggle between nations – the United States and imperialist Russia – rather than ideologies. He therefore dismissed Asia as a peripheral theater of the conflict, focusing on containment of Soviet expansion into Central and Eastern Europe. He also stressed the possibility of nuclear annihilation, preferring political solutions over military solutions to Soviet aggression. After the Cuban Missile Crisis, his position moderated further to one of détente.

His political stances and powerful position as Chairman of the Senate Foreign Relations Committee made him one of the most visible critics of American involvement in the Vietnam War. Although he was persuaded by President Lyndon Johnson to sponsor the Gulf of Tonkin Resolution in 1964, his relationship with the President soured after the 1965 U.S. escalation of the war in Vietnam and Fulbright's opposition to the war took root. Beginning in 1966, he chaired high-profile hearings investigating the conduct and progress of the war, which may have influenced the eventual American withdrawal.

On domestic issues, Fulbright was a Southern Democrat and signatory to the Southern Manifesto, though his views on segregation were more moderate than most of his Southern colleagues. Fulbright opposed the anti-Communist crusades of Joseph McCarthy and the similar investigations by the House Un-American Activities Committee.

== Early life, family and education ==
Fulbright was born on April 9, 1905, in Sumner, Missouri, the son of Jay and Roberta (née Waugh) Fulbright. In 1906, the Fulbright family moved to Fayetteville, Arkansas. His mother was a businesswoman, who consolidated her husband's business enterprises and became an influential newspaper publisher, editor, and journalist.

Fulbright's parents enrolled him in the University of Arkansas's College of Education's experimental grammar and secondary school.

=== University of Arkansas ===
Fulbright earned a Bachelor of Arts in political science from the University of Arkansas in 1925, where he became a member of the Sigma Chi fraternity. He was elected president of the student body, was a member of the debate team, and was a star four-year player for the Arkansas Razorbacks football team from 1921 to 1924.

=== Oxford University ===
Fulbright later studied at Oxford University, where he was a Rhodes Scholar at Pembroke College and graduated with a second bachelor's degree in modern history in 1928. Fulbright's time at Oxford made him into a lifelong Anglophile, and he always had warm memories of Oxford. He was awarded a Master of Arts from Oxford in 1931.

At Oxford, he played on the rugby and lacrosse teams, and every summer, Fulbright decamped for France ostensibly to improve his French but especially to enjoy life in France.

Fulbright credited his time at Oxford with broadening his horizons. In particular, he credited his professor and friend R. B. McCallum's "one world" philosophy of the world as an interlinked entity, where developments in one part would always have an impact on the other parts. McCallum was a great admirer of Woodrow Wilson, a supporter of the League of Nations, and a believer that multinational organizations were the best way to ensure global peace. Fulbright remained close to McCallum for the rest of his life and regularly exchanged letters with his mentor until McCallum's death in 1973.

In 1930, Fulbright met his first wife, Philadelphia socialite Elizabeth Kremer Williams, at a dinner party during a business trip to Washington, D.C. He moved to Washington shortly thereafter to remain close to her. The couple married on June 15, 1932, and went on to have two daughters.

Fulbright received his law degree from The George Washington University Law School in 1934, was admitted to the bar in the District of Columbia, and became an attorney in the Antitrust Division of the U.S. Department of Justice.

== Legal and academic career ==
Fulbright was a lecturer in law at the University of Arkansas from 1936 to 1939. He was appointed president of the school in 1939, making him the youngest university president in the country. He held that post until 1941. The School of Arts and Sciences at the University of Arkansas is named in his honor and he was a member of the Founding Council of the Rothermere American Institute, University of Oxford. In September 1939, Fulbright, as president of the University of Arkansas, issued a public declaration declaring his sympathy with the Allied cause and urged the United States to maintain a pro-Allied neutrality. In the summer of 1940, Fulbright went a step further and declared it was in America's "vital interest" to enter the war on the Allied side and warned that a victory by Nazi Germany would make the world a much darker place. The same year, Fulbright joined the Committee to Defend America by Aiding the Allies.

In June 1941, Fulbright was suddenly fired from the University of Arkansas by the Governor, Homer Martin Adkins. He learned that the reason for his sacking was that Adkins had been offended that a Northwest Arkansas newspaper owned by his mother Roberta Fulbright had supported the governor's opponent in the 1940 Democratic primary, and that was the governor's revenge. Upset at the way that the governor's caprice had ended his academic career, Fulbright became interested in politics.

In 1945, he was elected at the University of Arkansas into Phi Beta Kappa.

== U.S. House of Representatives ==
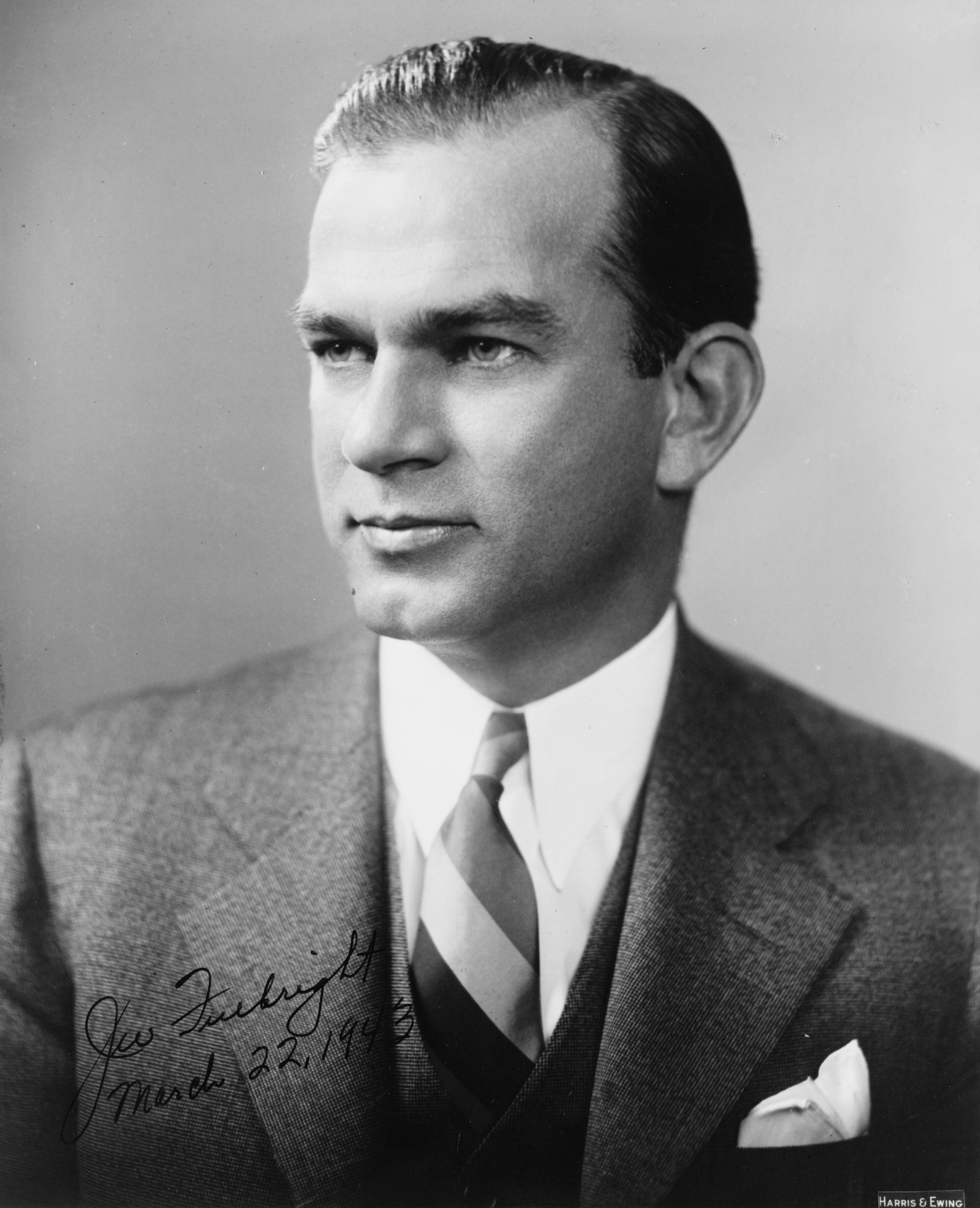
Portrait by Harris & Ewing c. 1943

Fulbright was elected to the United States House of Representatives as a Democrat in 1942, where he served one term. During this period, he became a member of the House Foreign Affairs Committee. During World War II, there was much debate about the best way to win the peace after the Allies presumably won the war, with many urging the United States to reject isolationism. In September 1943 the House adopted the Fulbright Resolution, which supported international peacekeeping initiatives and encouraged the United States to participate in what became the United Nations in 1945. That brought Fulbright to national attention.

In 1943, a confidential analysis by Isaiah Berlin of the House and Senate foreign relations committees for the British Foreign Office identified Fulbright as "a distinguished new-comer to the House." It continued:

A young (age 38) wealthy ex-Rhodes scholar, whose major experience so far has been of farming and business. He has already shown versatile competence and ability in business as special attorney in the Anti-Trust Division of the Justice Department and as president of the University of Arkansas. An alert and intelligent member of the committee who recently drew a comparison between the British practice of making grants to her allies and America's World War practice of making loans on fixed financial terms, to show that it was America which had departed from the general international practice in the matter. Fulbright would like to see the United States obtain only non-material benefits from Lend-Lease, namely, political commitments from the countries receiving it, that would enable a system of post-war collective security to be set up. An internationalist.

== U.S. Senator (1945–1974) ==
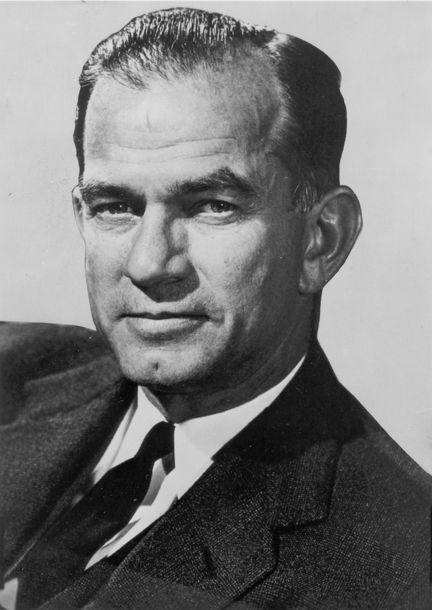
Fulbright early in his Senate career

Fulbright's career in the Senate was somewhat stunted, his tangible influence never matching his public luminescence. For all his seniority and powerful committee posts, he was not considered part of the Senate's inner circle of friends and power brokers. He seemed to prefer it that way: the man who Harry S. Truman had called an "overeducated SOB" was, in the words of Clayton Fritchey, "an individualist and a thinker," whose "intellectualism alone alienates him from the Club" of the Senate.

=== 1944 election ===
In his first bid for the Senate, he won the 1944 Democratic primary by besting both incumbent Hattie Carraway, the first woman ever elected to the U.S. Senate, T.H. Barton, founder of Lion Oil Company, and Homer Adkins, the sitting governor who had fired him from the University of Arkansas. He easily won the general election against the Republican Victor Wade, a common result in the heavily Democratic South of the era. He went on to serve five six-year terms.

=== Establishment of Fulbright program ===
He promoted the passage of legislation in 1946 establishing the Fulbright Program of educational grants (Fulbright Fellowships and Fulbright Scholarships), sponsored by the Bureau of Educational and Cultural Affairs of the United States Department of State, governments in other countries, and the private sector. The program was established to increase mutual understanding between the peoples of the United States and other countries through the exchange of persons, knowledge, and skills. It is considered one of the most prestigious award programs and operates in 155 countries.

=== Truman administration and Korean War ===
In November 1946, immediately following the midterm elections in which Democrats lost control of both houses of Congress amidst President Harry S. Truman's plummeting popularity in the polls, Fulbright suggested the President appoint Senator Arthur Vandenberg (R-MI) as his Secretary of State and resign, making Vandenberg president. (Note: As the vice-presidency was currently vacant due to Truman's ascension to the presidency (see the Twenty-fifth Amendment), the Secretary of State was next in the presidential line of succession as established by the Presidential Succession Act of 1886.) Truman responded by saying he did not care what Senator "Halfbright" said.

In 1947, Fulbright supported the Truman Doctrine and voted for American aid to Greece. Subsequently, he voted for the Marshall Plan and to join NATO. Fulbright was very supportive of the plans for a federation in Western Europe. Fulbright supported the 1950 plan written by Jean Monnet and presented by French Foreign Minister Robert Schuman for a European Coal and Steel Community, the earliest predecessor to the European Union.

In 1949, Fulbright became a member of the Senate Foreign Relations Committee.

After China's entry into the Korean War in October 1950, Fulbright warned against American escalation. On January 18, 1951, he dismissed Korea as a peripheral interest not worth the risk of World War III and condemned plans to attack China as reckless and dangerous. In the same speech, he argued that the Soviet Union, not China, was the real enemy and that Korea was a distraction from Europe, which he considered to be far more important.

When President Truman fired General Douglas MacArthur for insubordination in April 1951, Fulbright came to Truman's defense. When MacArthur appeared before the Senate Foreign Relations Committee at the invitation of Republican senators, Fulbright embraced his role of Truman's defender. When MacArthur argued communism was an inherent mortal danger to the United States, Fulbright countered, "I had not myself thought of our enemy as being Communism; I thought of it as primarily being imperialist Russia."

=== Eisenhower administration and conflict with Joe McCarthy ===
Fulbright was an early opponent of Senator Joseph McCarthy of Wisconsin, an ardent avowed anti-communist. Fulbright viewed McCarthy as an anti-intellectual, demagogue, and a major threat to American democracy and world peace. Fulbright was the only senator to vote against an appropriation for the Permanent Subcommittee on Investigations in 1954, which was chaired by McCarthy.

After Republicans gained a Senate majority in the 1952 elections, McCarthy became chairman of the Senate Committee on Government Operations. Fulbright was initially resistant to calls, like that of his friend William Benton of Connecticut, to openly oppose McCarthy. Though sympathetic toward Benton, who was among those Senators defeated in 1952 by anti-communist sentiment, Fulbright followed Senate Minority Leader Lyndon B. Johnson's lead in refraining from criticism. Fulbright was alarmed by McCarthy's attack on the Voice of America (VOA) and the United States Information Agency, the latter agency then supervising educational exchange programs.

Fulbright broke from Johnson's party line in summer 1953, following the State Department withdrawal of a fellowship for a student whose wife was suspected of communist affiliation and a Senate Appropriations Committee hearing which appeared to put the Fulbright Program at stake. In this hearing, McCarthy aggressively questioned Fulbright, whom he frequently referred to as "Senator Halfbright", over the composition of the board clearing students for funding and on a policy that bars communists and their sympathizers from receiving appointments as lecturers and professors. Fulbright stated that he had no such influence over the board. After McCarthy insisted to be authorized to release statements of some Fulbright Program students both praising the communist form of government and condemning American values, Fulbright countered that he was willing to submit thousands of names of students who had praised the US and its way of government in their statements. The encounter was the last time McCarthy made a public assault on the program. The leading historian and original Fulbright Program board member Walter Johnson credited Fulbright with preventing the program from being ended by McCarthyism.

=== 1956 re-election campaign ===
In 1956, Fulbright campaigned across the country for Adlai Stevenson II's presidential campaign and across Arkansas for his own re-election bid. Fulbright emphasized his opposition to civil rights and his support for segregation. He also noted his support for oil companies and consistent votes for more farm aid to poultry farmers, a key Arkansas constituency. He easily defeated his Republican challenger.

=== Kennedy administration ===
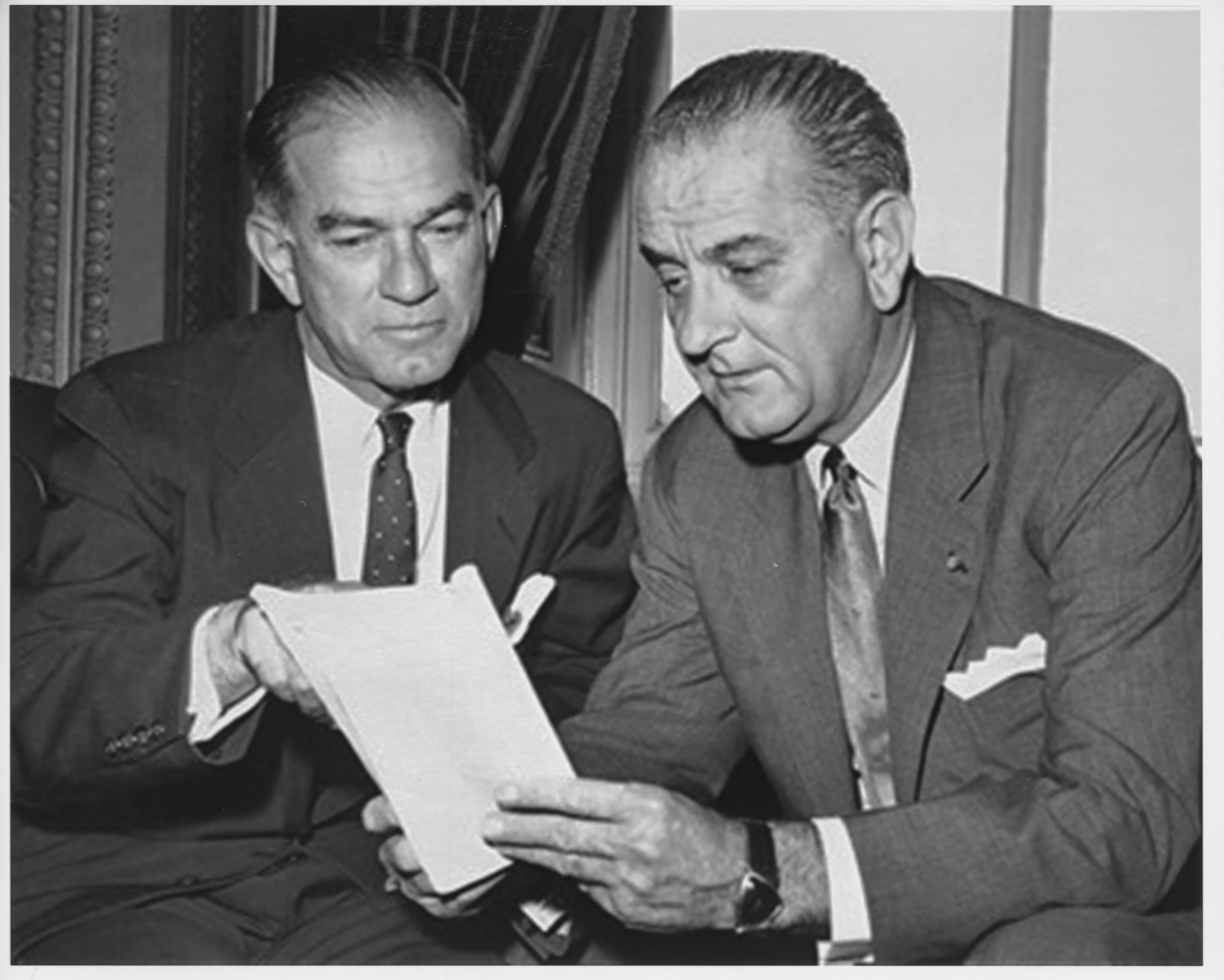
Sen. J. William Fulbright and Lyndon B. Johnson in Washington DC, June 21, 1960

Fulbright was John F. Kennedy's first choice for Secretary of State in 1961 and had the support of Vice President Lyndon Johnson, but opponents to the choice within Kennedy's circle, led by Harris Wofford, killed his chances. Dean Rusk was chosen instead.

In April 1961, Fulbright advised Kennedy not to go forward with the planned Bay of Pigs invasion. He said, "The Castro regime is a thorn in the flesh. But it is not a dagger at the heart." In May 1961, Fulbright denounced the Kennedy administration's system of having diplomats rotate from one position to another as an "idiot policy."

Fulbright provoked international controversy on July 30, 1961, two weeks before the erection of the Berlin Wall, when he said in a television interview, "I don't understand why the East Germans don't just close their border, because I think they have the right to close it." His statement received a three-column spread on the front page of the Socialist Unity Party of Germany newspaper Neues Deutschland and condemnation in West Germany. The U.S. embassy in Bonn reported that "rarely has a statement by a prominent American official aroused so much consternation, chagrin and anger." Chancellor Willy Brandt's Press Secretary Egon Bahr was quoted, "We privately called him Fulbricht. (Note: In reference to Walter Ulbricht, the East German head of state at the time.)" Historian William R. Smyser suggests that Fulbright's comment may have been made at President Kennedy's behest, as a signal to Soviet premier Nikita Khrushchev that the wall would be an acceptable means of defusing the Berlin Crisis. Kennedy did not distance himself from Fulbright's comments, despite pressure.

In August 1961, as the Kennedy administration held firm in its commitment to a five-year foreign aid program, Fulbright and Pennsylvania U.S. Representative Thomas E. Morgan accompanied Democratic congressional leadership to their weekly White House breakfast session with Kennedy. In delivering opening statements on August 4, Fulbright spoke of the program introducing a new concept of foreign aid in the event of its passage.

The President is hobbled in his task of leading the American people to consensus and concerted action by the restrictions of power imposed on him by a constitutional system designed for an 18th century agrarian society far removed from the centers of world power. He alone, among elected officials can rise above parochialism and private pressures. He alone, in his role as teacher and moral leader, can hope to overcome the excesses and inadequacies of a public opinion that is all too often ignorant of the needs, the dangers, and the opportunities in our foreign relations. It is imperative that we break out of the intellectual confines of cherished and traditional beliefs and open our minds to the possibility that Basic Changes in Our System may be essential to meet the requirements of the 20th century.

— J William Fulbright, Stanford University, 1961

Fulbright met with Kennedy during the latter's visit to Fort Smith, Arkansas in October 1961.

After the 1962 Cuban Missile Crisis, Fulbright modified his position on the Soviet Union from "containment" to détente. His position drew criticism from Senator Barry Goldwater, now the leader of anti-communists in the Senate. In response to Goldwater's call for a "total victory" over communism, Fulbright argued that even "total victory" would mean hundreds of millions of deaths and an impossible, prolonged occupation of a ravaged Soviet Union and China.

==== Chicken war ====
Intensive chicken farming in the United States led to a 1961–64 "chicken war" with Europe. With inexpensive imported chicken available, chicken prices fell quickly and sharply across Europe, radically affecting European chicken consumption. U.S. chicken overtook nearly half of the imported European chicken market. Europe instituted tariffs on American chicken, to the detriment of Arkansan chicken farmers.

Senator Fulbright interrupted a NATO debate on nuclear armament to protest the tariffs, going so far as to threaten cutting US troops in NATO. The U.S. subsequently enacted a 25% tariff on imported light trucks, known as the chicken tax, which remains in effect as of 2010.

One of Fulbright's local staffers in Arkansas was James McDougal. While he worked for Fulbright, McDougal met the future Arkansas Governor and US President Bill Clinton and the two of them, along with their wives, began investing in various development properties, including the parcel of land along the White River in the Ozarks that would later be the subject of an independent counsel investigation during Clinton's first term in office.

=== Johnson administration ===
On March 25, 1964, Fulbright delivered an address calling on the U.S. to adapt itself to a world that was both changing and complex, the address being said by Fulbright to have been meant to explore self-evident truths in the national vocabulary of the U.S. regarding the Soviet Union, Cuba, China, Panama, and Latin America.

In May 1964, Fulbright predicted that time would see a cessation in the misunderstanding within the relationship between France and the United States and that French President Charles de Gaulle was deeply admired for his achievements despite confusion that might arise in others from his rhetoric.

In 1965, Fulbright objected to President Lyndon B. Johnson's position on the Dominican Civil War.

=== Vietnam War ===
==== Gulf of Tonkin resolution ====
On 4 August 1964, Defense Secretary Robert McNamara accused North Vietnam of attacking an American destroyer, the USS Maddox in international waters in what came to be known as the Gulf of Tonkin incident. The same day, President Johnson went on national television to denounce North Vietnam for "aggression" and to announce that he had ordered retaliatory air raids on North Vietnam. In the same speech, Johnson asked Congress to pass a resolution to prove to North Vietnam and its ally, China that the United States was united "in support of freedom and in defense of peace in southeast Asia." On 5 August 1964, Fulbright arrived at the White House to meet Johnson, where Johnson asked his old friend to use all his influence to get the resolution passed by the widest possible margin. Fulbright was one of the senators whom Johnson was most anxious and keen to have support the resolution. Fulbright was too much an individualist and intellectual to belong to the "Club" of the Senate, but he was widely respected as a thinker on foreign policy and was known to be a defender of Congress's prerogatives. From Johnson's viewpoint, having him support the resolution would bring many of the waverers around to voting for the resolution, as indeed proved to be the case.

Johnson insisted quite vehemently to Fulbright that the alleged attack on the Maddox had taken place, and it was only later that Fulbright became skeptical about whether the alleged attack had really taken place. Furthermore, Johnson insisted that the resolution, which was a "functional equivalent to a declaration of war," was not intended to be used for going to war in Vietnam. In the 1964 presidential election, the Republicans had nominated Goldwater as their candidate, who ran on a platform accusing Johnson of being "soft on communism" and by contrast promised a "total victory" over communism. Johnson argued to Fulbright that the resolution was an election-year stunt that would prove to the voters that he was really "tough on communism" and so dent the appeal of Goldwater by denying him of his main avenue of attack. Besides for the internal political reason that Johnson gave for the resolution, he also gave a foreign policy reason that argued that such a resolution would intimidate North Vietnam into ceasing to try to overthrow the government of South Vietnam and so Congress passage of the resolution would make American involvement in Vietnam less likely, rather than more likely. Fulbright's longstanding friendship with Johnson made it difficult for him to go against the President, who cunningly exploited Fulbright's vulnerability, his desire to have greater influence over foreign policy. Johnson gave Fulbright the impression that he would be one of his unofficial advisers on foreign policy and that he was very interested in turning his ideas into policies if he voted for the resolution, which was a test of their friendship. Johnson also hinted that he was thinking about sacking Rusk if he won the 1964 election and would consider nominating Fulbright to be the next Secretary of State. Finally, for Fulbright in 1964, it was inconceivable that Johnson would lie to him, and Fulbright believed the resolution "was not going to be used for anything other than the Tonkin Gulf incident itself," as Johnson had told him.

On 6 August 1964, Fulbright gave a speech on the Senate floor that called for the resolution to be passed as he accused North Vietnam of "aggression" and praised Johnson for his "great restraint... in response to the provocation of a small power." He also declared his support for the Johnson administration's "noble" Vietnam policy, which he called a policy of seeking "to establish viable, independent states in Indochina and elsewhere which will be free and secure from the combination of Communist China and Communist North Vietnam." Fulbright concluded that the policy could be accomplished via diplomatic means and, echoing Johnson's argument, argued that it was necessary to pass the resolution as a way to intimidate North Vietnam, which would presumably change its policies towards South Vietnam once Congress passed the resolution. Several senators, such as Allen J. Ellender, Jacob Javits, John Sherman Cooper, Daniel Brewster, George McGovern, and Gaylord Nelson, were very reluctant to vote for a resolution that would be a blank check for a war in Southeast Asia, and in a meeting, Fulbright sought to assure them by saying that passing such a resolution would make fighting a war less likely and claimed that the whole purpose of the resolution was intimidation. Nelson wanted to insert an amendment to bar the president from sending troops to fight in Vietnam unless he obtained the permission of Congress first and said that he did not like the open-ended nature of this resolution. Fulbright persuaded him not to do so by arguing the resolution was "harmless" and saying that the real purpose of the resolution was "to pull the rug out from under Goldwater." He went on to ask Nelson whether he preferred Johnson or Goldwater to win the election. Fulbright dismissed Nelson's fears of giving Johnson a blank check by saying that he had Johnson's word that "the last thing we want to do is become involved in a land war in Asia."

On August 7, 1964, a unanimous House of Representatives and all but two members of the Senate voted to approve the Gulf of Tonkin Resolution, which led to a dramatic escalation of the Vietnam War. Fulbright, who sponsored the resolution, would later write:

Many Senators who accepted the Gulf of Tonkin resolution without question might well not have done so had they foreseen that it would subsequently be interpreted as a sweeping Congressional endorsement for the conduct of a large-scale war in Asia.

==== Fulbright hearings and opposition to war ====
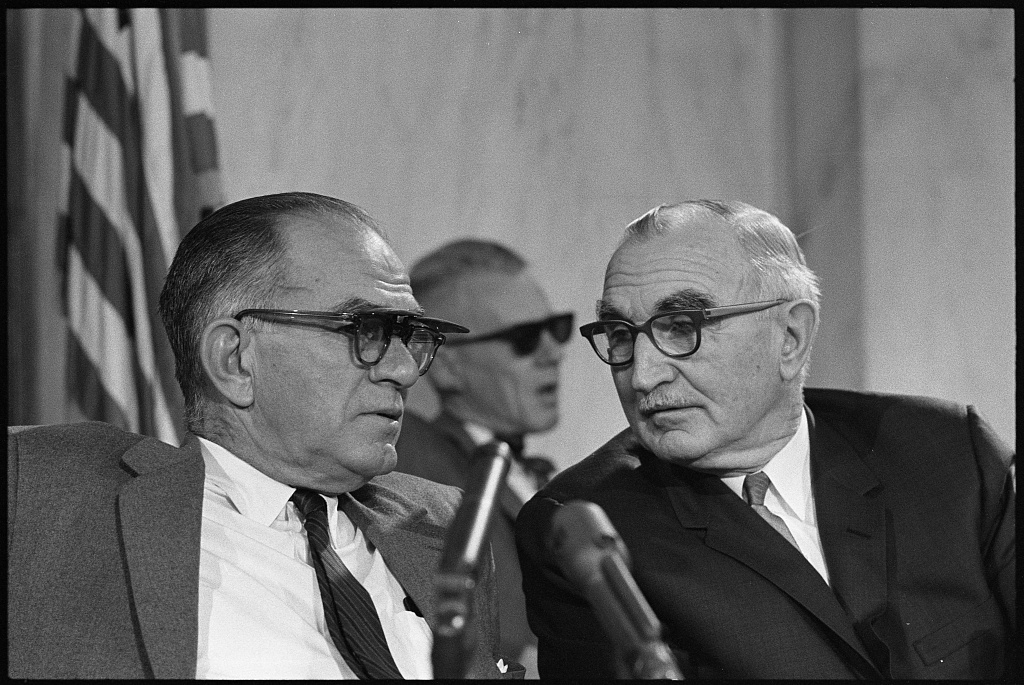
Fulbright (left) with Senator Wayne Morse during a hearing of the Senate Foreign Relations Committee on the Vietnam War in 1966

By his own admission, Fulbright knew almost nothing about Vietnam until he met, in 1965, Bernard B. Fall, a French journalist who often wrote about Vietnam. Speaking to Fall radically changed Fulbright's thinking about Vietnam, as Fall asserted that it simply not true that Ho Chi Minh was a Sino-Soviet "puppet" who wanted to overthrow the government of South Vietnam because his masters in Moscow and Beijing had presumably told him to do so. Fall's influence served as the catalyst for the change in Fulbright's thinking, as Fall introduced him to the writings of Philippe Devillers and Jean Lacouture. Fulbright made it his mission to learn as much as possible about Vietnam and indeed he had learned so much that at a meeting with the Secretary of State Dean Rusk, Fulbright was able to correct several mistakes made by the former about Vietnamese history, much to Rusk's discomfort.

Although President Lyndon Johnson cajoled Fulbright into sponsoring the Gulf of Tonkin resolution in August 1964, his relationship with the President soured after the 1965 U.S. bombing of North Vietnam and sending of troops to South Vietnam, which Fulbright considered a breach of Johnson's commitment not to escalate the war. Fulbright's opposition to the war in Vietnam took root, and beginning in 1966, he chaired public Senate Foreign Relations Committee hearings on the conduct of the war.

Fulbright invited President Johnson to appear before the Committee in January 1966 to explain why America was fighting in Vietnam, an offer that the President refused.

On 4 February 1966, Fulbright held the first hearings about the Vietnam War, where George F. Kennan and General James M. Gavin appeared as expert witnesses. The hearings had been prompted by Johnson's request for additional $400 million to pay for the war, which gave Fulbright an excuse to hold them. Kennan testified that the Vietnam War was a grotesque distortion of the containment policy that he had outlined in 1946 and 1947. The World War II hero Gavin testified that it was his opinion as a soldier that the war could not be won as it being fought. On 4 February 1966, in an attempt to upstage the hearings Fulbright was holding in Washington, Johnson called an impromptu summit in Honolulu in the hope that the media would play more attention to the summit that he had called than to the hearings Fulbright was holding. Johnson's two rebuttal witnesses at the hearings were General Maxwell Taylor and Secretary of State Dean Rusk.

As chairman of the Foreign Relations Committee, Fulbright held a series of hearings on the Vietnam War from 1966 to 1971, many of which were televised to the nation in their entirety, a rarity until C-SPAN.

Fulbright's reputation as a well-informed expert on foreign policy and his folksy Southern drawl, which made him sound "authentic" to ordinary Americans, made a formidable opponent for Johnson. During his exchanges with Taylor, Fulbright equated the firebombing of Japanese cities in World War II with the Operation Rolling Thunder bombings of North Vietnam and the use of napalm in South Vietnam, much to Taylor's discomfort. Fulbright condemned the bombing of North Vietnam and asked Taylor to think of the "millions of little children, sweet little children, innocent pure babies who love their mothers, and mothers who love their children, just like you love your son, thousands of little children, who never did us any harm, being slowly burned to death." A visibly uncomfortable Taylor stated that the United States was not targeting civilians in either Vietnam. Johnson called the hearings "a very, very disastrous break."

As Fulbright had once been Johnson's friend, his criticism of the war was seen as a personal betrayal and Johnson lashed out in especially vitriolic terms against him. Johnson took the view that at least Senator Wayne Morse had always been opposed to the Vietnam War, but Fulbright had promised him to support his Vietnam policy in 1964, causing him to see Fulbright as a "Judas" figure. Johnson liked to mock Fulbright as "Senator Halfbright" and sneered it was astonishing that someone as "stupid" as Fulbright had been awarded a degree at Oxford.

In April 1966, Fulbright delivered a speech at Johns Hopkins University, where Johnson had delivered a forthright defense of the war just a year earlier. Fulbright was sharply critical of the war. In his speech delivered in his usual folksy Southern drawl, Fulbright stated that the United States was "in danger of losing its perspective on what exactly is within the realm of its power and what is beyond it." Warning of what he called "the arrogance of power," Fulbright declared "we are not living up to our capacity and promise as a civilized power for the world." He called the war a betrayal of American values. Johnson was furious with the speech, which he saw a personal attack from a man who had once been his friend and believed the remark about the "arrogance of power" to be about him. Johnson lashed out in a speech in which he called Fulbright and other critics of the war "nervous Nellies," who knew the war in Vietnam could and would be won but were just too cowardly to fight on to the final victory.

In 1966, Fulbright published The Arrogance of Power, which attacked the justification of the Vietnam War, Congress's failure to set limits on it, and the impulses that had given rise to it. Fulbright's scathing critique undermined the elite consensus that the military intervention in Indochina was necessitated by Cold War geopolitics.

By 1967, the Senate was divided into three blocs. There was an antiwar "dove" bloc, led by Fulbright; a pro-war "hawk" bloc, led by the conservative Southern Democrat Senator John C. Stennis, and a third bloc consisting of waverers, who tended to shift their positions about war in tune with public opinion and moved variously closer to doves and hawks as they followed the public opinion polls. In contrast to his hostile attitudes towards Fulbright, Johnson was afraid of being labeled as soft on communism and so tended to try to appease Stennis and the hawks, who kept pressuring for more-and-more aggressive measures in Vietnam. In criticizing the war, Fulbright was careful to draw a distinction between condemning the war and condemning the ordinary soldiers fighting the war. After General William Westmoreland gave a speech in 1967 before a joint session of Congress, Fulbright stated, "From the military standpoint, it was fine. The point is the policy that put our boys there." On 25 July 1967, Fulbright was invited with all of the other chairmen of the Senate committees to the White House to hear Johnson say that the war was being won. Fulbright told Johnson: "Mr. President, what you really need to do is stop the war. That will solve all your problems. Vietnam is ruining our domestic and our foreign policy. I will not support it anymore." To prove that he was serious, Fulbright threatened to block a foreign aid bill before his committee and said that it was the only way to make Johnson pay attention to his concerns. Johnson accused Fulbright of wanting to ruin America's reputation around the world. Using his favorite tactic of seeking to divide his opponents, Johnson told the other senators: "I understand all of you feel you under the gun when you are down here, at least according to Bill Fulbright." Fulbright replied: "Well, my position is that Vietnam is central to the whole problem. We need a new look. The effects of Vietnam are hurting the budget and foreign relations generally." Johnson exploded in fury: "Bill, everybody doesn't have a blind spot like you do. You say, 'Don't bomb North Vietnam', on just about everything. I don't have simple solution you have.... I am not going to tell our men in the field to put their right hands behind their backs and fight only with their lefts. If you want me to get out of Vietnam, then you have the prerogative of taking the resolution which we are out there now. You can repeal it tomorrow. You can tell the troops to come home. You can tell General Westmoreland that he doesn't know what is doing." As Johnson's face was red, Senate Majority Leader Mike Mansfield decided to calm matters down by changing the subject.

In early 1968, Fulbright was deeply depressed as he stated: "The President, unfortunately, seems to have closed his mind to the consideration of any alternative, and his Rasputin–W.W. Rostow–seems able to isolate him from other views, and the Secretary [of State] happens to agree. I regret that I am unable to break this crust of immunity." However, after Robert McNamara was fired as Defense Secretary, Fulbright saw a "ray of light" as the man who replaced McNamara, Clark Clifford, was a longstanding "close personal friend." Johnson had appointed Clifford Defense Secretary because he was a hawk, but Fulbright sought to change his mind about Vietnam. Fulbright invited Clifford to a secret meeting in which he introduced the newly appointed Defense Secretary to two World War II heroes, General James M. Gavin and General Matthew Ridgway. Both Gavin and Ridgway were emphatic that the United States could not win the war in Vietnam, and their opposition to the war helped to change Clifford's mind. Despite his success with Clifford, Fulbright was close to despair as he wrote in a letter to Erich Fromm that this "literally a miasma of madness in the city, enveloping everyone in the administration and most of those in Congress. I am at a loss of words to describe the idiocy of what we are doing."

Seeing that the Johnson administration was reeling in the wake of the Tet Offensive, Fulbright in February 1968 called for hearings by the Senate Foreign Relations Committee into the Gulf of Tonkin incident, as Fulbright noted that there were several aspects of the claim that North Vietnamese torpedo boats had attacked American destroyers in international waters that seemed dubious and questionable. McNamara was subpoenaed, and the televised hearings led to "fireworks" as Fulbright repeatedly asked difficult answers about De Soto raids on North Vietnam and Operation 34A. On 11 March 1968, Secretary of State Dean Rusk appeared before the Senate Foreign Relations Committee. Fulbright made his sympathies clear by wearing a tie decorated with doves carrying olive branches. Through Rusk was scheduled to testify about the Gulf of Tonkin incident, the previous day in The New York Times had appeared a leaked story that Westmoreland had requested for Johnson to send 206,000 more troops to Vietnam. During Rusk's two days of testimony, the main issue turned out to be the troop request with Fulbright insisting for Johnson to seek congressional approval first. In response to Fulbright's questions, Rusk stated that if more troops were sent to Vietnam, the president would consult "appropriate members of Congress." Most notably, several senators who had voted with Stennis and the other hawks now aligned themselves with Fulbright, which indicated that Congress was turning against the war.

In late October 1968, after Johnson announced a halt in bombing in North Vietnam in accordance with peace talks, Fulbright stated that his hopefulness that the announcement would lead to a general ceasefire.

=== Nixon administration ===
In March 1969, Secretary of State William P. Rogers testified at a Senate Foreign Relations Committee hearing on the Nixon administration's foreign policy, Fulbright telling Rogers that the appearance was both useful and promising. In April 1969, Fublright received a letter from a former soldier who served in Vietnam, Ron Ridenhour, containing the results of Ridenhour's investigation into the My Lai massacre, said that he had heard so many stories from other soldiers about a massacre that had happened in March 1968 at a village that the soldiers knew only as "Pinkville." In May 1969, Fulbright delivered a speech at National War College that advocated for a U.S. withdraw from Vietnam in spite of possibly having to settle for something less than a standoff against the communists. He spoke for overhauling foreign policy to concentrate it less on the power of the executive branch. On 15 October 1969, Fulbright spoke at one of the rallies held by the Moratorium to End the War in Vietnam. As all of the rallies held on 15 October were peaceful, Fulbright taunted a reporter who was hoping there would be violence: "I am sorry that you thought the demonstrations of 15 October were 'subversive and hysterical'. They seemed to me to be extremely well-behaved and a very serious demonstration of disapproval of the tragic mistake... in Vietnam." In response to the Moratorium protests, President Nixon went on national television on 3 November 1969 to give his speech asking for the support of the "silent majority" towards his Vietnam policy. On 4 November, Fulbright told a journalist that Nixon had "fully and truthfully taken upon himself Johnson's war." Fulbright called for the second round of the Moratorium protests scheduled for 15 November to be canceled for fear that Nixon was planning to start a riot to discredit the antiwar movement. The protests in the 15th went ahead and were peaceful, but the success of Nixon's "silent majority speech" left Fulbright depressed as he wrote at the time that "it is very distressing, indeed, to think that we eliminated LBJ only to end up with this, which is almost more than the human spirit can endure." However, on 12 November 1969 appeared in The New York Times an article by Seymour Hersh revealing the My Lai massacre on 16 March 1968. Fulbright was deeply shocked when he learned about what happened at May Lai: "it is a matter of the greatest importance and emphasizes in the most dramatic manner the brutalization of our society."

In 1970, Daniel Ellsberg offered Fulbright his copy of the Pentagon Papers to ask him to insert them into the Congressional Record, which would allow the media to cite them without fear of prosecution for publishing secret documents. Fulbright declined and instead sent a letter to Defense Secretary Melvin Laird asking him to declassify the Pentagon Papers. In 1971, Fulbright held another set of hearing about the Vietnam. The Fulbright Hearings included the notable testimony of Vietnam veteran and future Senator and Secretary of State John Kerry.

In February 1970, South Dakota Senator George McGovern accused the former Viet Cong detainee James N. Rowe of being dispatched by the Pentagon to criticize him, Fulbright, and Senate Majority Leader Mike Mansfield, who had indicated their opposition to continued American involvement in Vietnam. On March 11, Fulbright introduced a resolution regarding the commitment of American troops or air forces for combat in Laos by Nixon, who, under the guidelines of the resolution, would not be able to use combat forces in or over Laos without congressional affirmative action. In his address introducing the resolution, Fulbright said, "The Senate must not remain silent now while the President uses the armed forces of the United States to, fight an undeclared and undisclosed war in Laos." The following month, the Senate Foreign Relations Committee voted to repeal the 1964 Gulf of Tonkin Resolution. Fulbright admitted the repeal would now have little to no legal impact and described the action as one intended to be part of an ongoing process of clearing out legislation that was now out of date. On August 22, Fulbright stated his support for a bilateral treaty to grant the United States authority to use military force to guarantee both "territory and independence of Israel within the borders of 1967" and that the proposed measure would obligate Israel not to violate those frontiers, which had been created prior to the Six-Day War. In October, Defense Department officials disclosed publication of testimony before the Senate Foreign Relations Committee showing the United States entered a 1960 agreement supporting a 40,000-man Ethiopian army in addition to beginning Ethiopia's opposition to threats against its territorial integrity. Fulbright responded to the disclosure by saying the wording seemed to go "much further than saying a good word in the United Nations" and suggested the U.S. had agreed to aid the Ethiopian Emperor if the possibility of facing an internal insurrection arose.

On February 28, 1971, Fulbright announced his intent to submit a bill compelling the Secretary of State and other Nixon administration officials to appear before Congress to explain their position on Vietnam. Fulbright said that the measure would be warranted by the refusal of William P. Rogers, Henry A. Kissinger, and other officials to appear before Congress. He reasoned that they would not appear because "they know there are a number of people who don't agree with them, and it makes it embarrassing and they don't like it; they especially don't like to have it in front of television." On October 31, Fulbright pledged his support to less-controversial aspects of foreign aid such as refugee relief and military aid to Israel and predicted the Nixon administration would be met with defeat or contention in the event of proposed aid for Cambodia, Vietnam, Laos, and Greece. Fulbright said a meeting between the Foreign Relations Committee the following day would see "that some kind of interim program will probably be devised" and expressed his disdain for "the continuing resolution approach."

In March 1972, Fulbright sent a letter to Acting Attorney General Richard G. Kleindienst to request to the Justice Department not to use the Information Agency documentary Czechoslovakia 1968 for use in New York. He stated that it appeared to violate the 1948 law that created the agency, which he stated "was created for the purpose of the dissemination abroad of information about the United States, its people, and policies." In April, the Senate Foreign Relations Committee announced the end of an inquiry into a drinking incident involving United States Ambassador to France Arthur K. Watson. Fulbright said that he did not expect the committee to pursue the matter and published a letter on the subject from Rogers. On August 3, the Senate approved the treaty limiting defense missiles for the United States and the Soviet Union. The following day, Fulbright held a closed meeting with members of the Senate Foreign Relations Committee to form a strategy against the Nixon administration's attempts to attach additional reservations to the intercontinental missile agreement signed by Nixon the previous May.

On July 11, 1973, during a speech at an American Bankers Association meeting, Fulbright criticized Capitol Hill attempts to block trade concessions to the Soviet Union until it allowed the emigration of Jews and other groups: "Learning to live together in peace is the most important issue for the Soviet Union and the United States, too important to be compromised by meddling – even idealistic meddling – in each other's affairs." In August, Nixon announced his choice of Kissinger to replace the retiring Rogers as Secretary of State. Ahead of the hearings, Kissinger was expected to have the advantage of cultivating relationships with members of the Senate Foreign Relations Committee, Vermont Senator George Aiken noting that Kissinger "met with us at Senator Fulbright's house for breakfast at least twice a year."

In November 1973, Fulbright endorsed the Middle East policy of Secretary of State Kissinger in a Senate speech, arguing for the central requirement of a peace requirement prior to "another military truce hardens into another untenable and illusory status quo" and added that both sides would need to make concessions. Fulbright stated that Washington, Moscow, and the United Nations were responsible for spearheading the peace settlement.

Fulbright also led the charge against confirming Nixon's conservative Supreme Court nominees Clement Haynsworth and Harold Carswell. He was also, alongside Oklahoma's Fred R. Harris, one of only two southern Senators to vote against William Rehnquist's nomination.

In May 1974, Fulbright disclosed the existence of a weapon stockpile for South Korea, South Vietnam, and Thailand, and the Defense Department released a statement three days later that confirmed Fulbright's admission. Throughout 1974, Kissinger was investigated for his possible role in initiating wiretaps of 13 government officials and four newsmen from 1969 to 1971. In July, Fulbright stated that nothing significant had emerged from the Kissinger testimony during his nomination for Secretary of State the previous fall, and Fulbright indicated his belief that opponents of détente with the Soviet Union were hoping to unseat Kissinger from the investigation into his role in the wiretapping.

=== Defeat and resignation ===
In 1974, Fulbright was defeated in the Democratic primary in Arkansas by then-Governor Dale Bumpers. His well-documented stances on Vietnam, the Middle East, and Watergate were out of step with the Arkansan majority, and his campaign powers had atrophied. Bumpers won by a landslide. Speaking to US representatives in the weeks after Fulbright's primary loss, Nixon mocked the defeat.

At the time that he formally resigned the Senate in December 1974, Fulbright had spent his entire 29 years in the Senate as the junior senator from Arkansas, behind John L. McClellan who entered the Senate two years before him. Only Tom Harkin (who served as junior Senator from Iowa from 1985 to 2015 alongside senior Senator Chuck Grassley) and Fritz Hollings (who served as junior Senator from South Carolina from 1966 to 2003 alongside Strom Thurmond before serving as the state’s senior Senator until retiring in 2005) were junior Senators for longer.

== Political and foreign policy views ==
=== American foreign policy ===
In The Arrogance of Power, Fulbright offered his analysis of American foreign policy:

Throughout our history two strands have coexisted uneasily; a dominant strand of democratic humanism and a lesser but durable strand of intolerant Puritanism. There has been a tendency through the years for reason and moderation to prevail as long as things are going tolerably well or as long as our problems seem clear and finite and manageable. But... when some event or leader of opinion has aroused the people to a state of high emotion, our puritan spirit has tended to break through, leading us to look at the world through the distorting prism of a harsh and angry moralism.

Fulbright also related his opposition to any American tendencies to intervene in the affairs of other nations:

Power tends to confuse itself with virtue and a great nation is particularly susceptible to the idea that its power is a sign of God's favor, conferring upon it a special responsibility for other nations – to make them richer and happier and wiser, to remake them, that is, in its own shining image. Power confuses itself with virtue and tends also to take itself for omnipotence. Once imbued with the idea of a mission, a great nation easily assumes that it has the means as well as the duty to do God's work.

He was also a strong believer in international law:

Law is the essential foundation of stability and order both within societies and in international relations. As a conservative power, the United States has a vital interest in upholding and expanding the reign of law in international relations. Insofar as international law is observed, it provides us with stability and order and with a means of predicting the behavior of those with whom we have reciprocal legal obligations. When we violate the law ourselves, whatever short-term advantage may be gained, we are obviously encouraging others to violate the law; we thus encourage disorder and instability and thereby do incalculable damage to our own long-term interests.

=== Cold War and communism ===
Like his friend Adlai Stevenson II, Fulbright was regarded as a "Cold War liberal."

Fulbright viewed the Cold War as a struggle between the United States and a new imperialist Russia. To that end, he advocated vigorous aid and armament for Europe as opposed to a global anti-communist policy, which would include opposition to the People's Republic of China.

As late as 1965 Fulbright was favoring a policy of hostility toward the PRC, which he regarded as dangerously aggressive. But by 1966 he was changing this view. In March 1966, Fulbright held hearings on US policy towards the PRC. Almost uniformly, the academics who testified favored ending the US's isolation of the PRC.

Fulbright additionally believed that conflict with the Soviet Union would almost certainly lead to nuclear war and potentially global annihilation. He initially favored the policy of containment of the Soviet Union, instead of the more aggressive rollback policy. Fulbright saw the Cold War as more of a political struggle than a military struggle and criticized excessive military spending as a means of victory. After the Cuban Missile Crisis, he further modified his position toward the Soviets to détente.

=== Segregation and civil rights ===
In 1950, Fulbright cosponsored an amendment, which, if enacted, would allow soldiers to choose whether or not to serve in a racially integrated unit. In 1952, Fulbright assisted with blocking an Alaska statehood bill entirely because of his view that legislators from the state would support civil rights bills.

According to biographer Randall Bennett Woods, Fulbright believed the South was not yet ready for integration but that education would eventually eradicate prejudice and allow blacks to "take their rightful place in American society." In 1954, Fulbright signed Strom Thurmond's Southern Manifesto in opposition to the Brown v. Board of Education decision. In a letter to a constituent at the time, he compared the Manifesto favorably to the alternative of secession. Privately, he assured aides that signing the Manifesto was his only means of maintaining influence with the Southern delegation. He, along with John Sparkman, Lister Hill, and Price Daniel, submitted a version that acknowledged theirs was a minority position and pledged to fight the Brown ruling through legal means. In later years, he insisted his intervention had led to a more moderate version of the Manifesto than Thurmond originally proposed, and his claims were generally accepted by Arkansan black leadership.

Fulbright was one of only two Southern members of Congress to condemn the 16th Street Baptist Church bombing in Birmingham, Ala., in 1963 by white supremacists that killed four girls and injured between 14 and 22 other people.

With other southern Democrats, Fulbright participated in the filibuster of the Civil Rights Act of 1964 and opposed the 1965 Voting Rights Act. However, in 1970, Fulbright voted for a five-year extension of the Voting Rights Act.

=== Israel ===
In 1963, Fulbright claimed that $5 million tax-deductible from philanthropic Americans was sent to Israel and then recycled back to the U.S. for distribution to organizations seeking to influence public opinion in favor of Israel.

On April 15, 1973, Fulbright said on Face the Nation, "Israel controls the U.S. Senate. The Senate is subservient to Israel, in my opinion much too much. We should be more concerned about the United States interest rather than doing the bidding of Israel. This is a most unusual development." According to political scientists John Mearsheimer and Stephen Walt, the pro-Israel lobbying group AIPAC played an important role in Fulbright's failure to be re-elected in 1974.

== Retirement and death ==
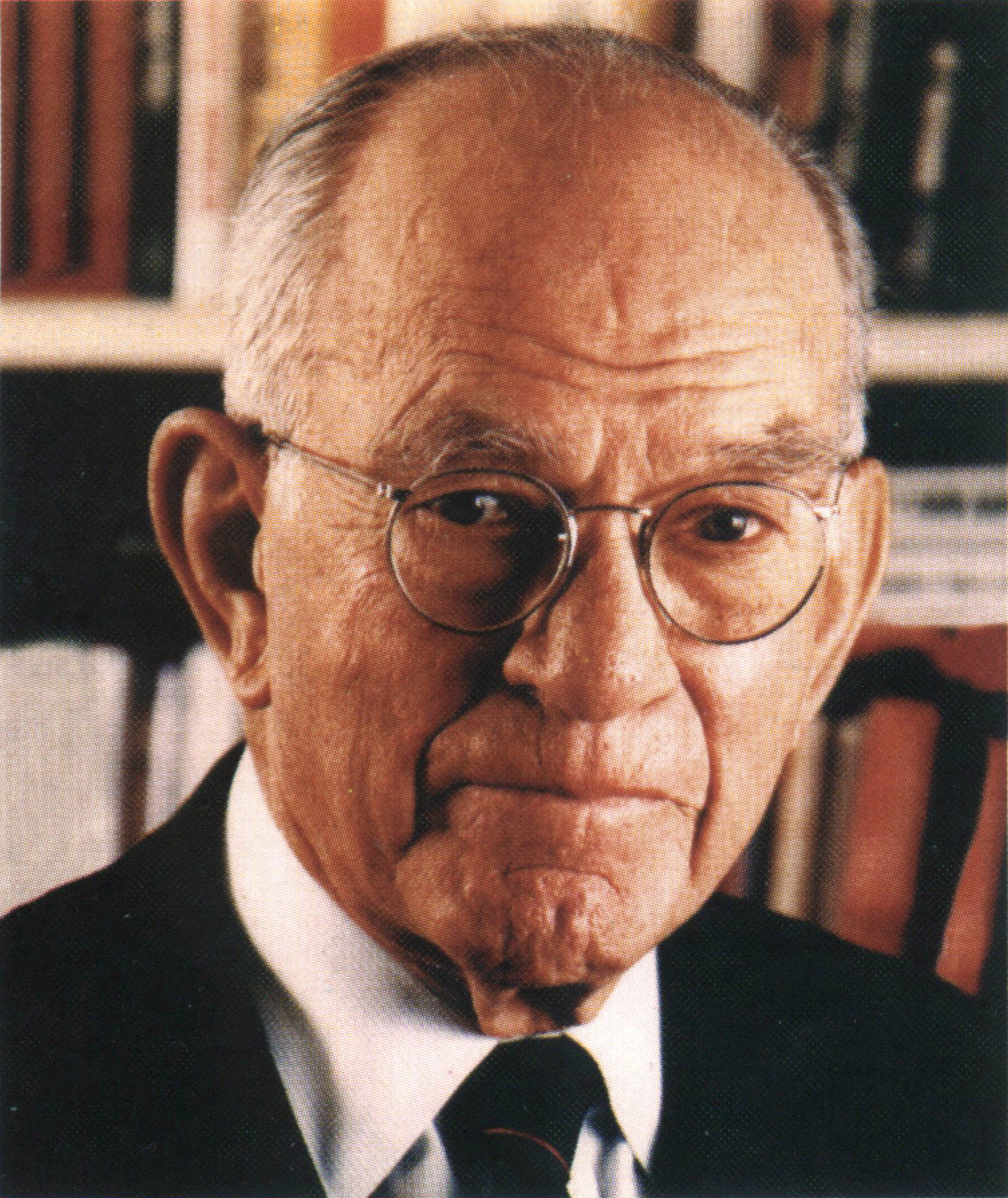
Fulbright in his later years

After his retirement, Fulbright practiced international law at the Washington, D.C. office of the law firm Hogan & Hartson from 1975 to 1993. Elizabeth, an effective campaigner and popular figure on the Capitol Hill social scene during her husband's long political career, died on October 5, 1985, after a long illness. On March 10, 1990, Fulbright married Harriet Mayor, a longtime assistant and former executive director of the Fulbright Association, in a ceremony at his home in Washington's Kalorama neighborhood.

On May 5, 1993, President Bill Clinton presented the Presidential Medal of Freedom to Fulbright at his eighty-eighth birthday celebration from the Fulbright Association.

Fulbright died of a stroke at his Washington, D.C. home on February 9, 1995. He was 89 years old. A year later, on the occasion of the 50th anniversary dinner of the Fulbright Program held June 5, 1996 at the White House, President Bill Clinton said, "Hillary and I have looked forward for some time to celebrating this 50th anniversary of the Fulbright Program, to honor the dream and legacy of a great American, a citizen of the world, a native of my home state and my mentor and friend, Senator Fulbright."

Fulbright's ashes were interred at the Fulbright family plot in Evergreen Cemetery in Fayetteville, Arkansas.

== Legacy ==
In 1996, The George Washington University renamed a residence hall in his honor. The J. William Fulbright Hall is located 2223 H Street, N.W., at the corner of 23rd and H Streets. It received historic designations as a District of Columbia historic site on January 28, 2010, and was listed on the National Register of Historic Places on June 18, 2010.

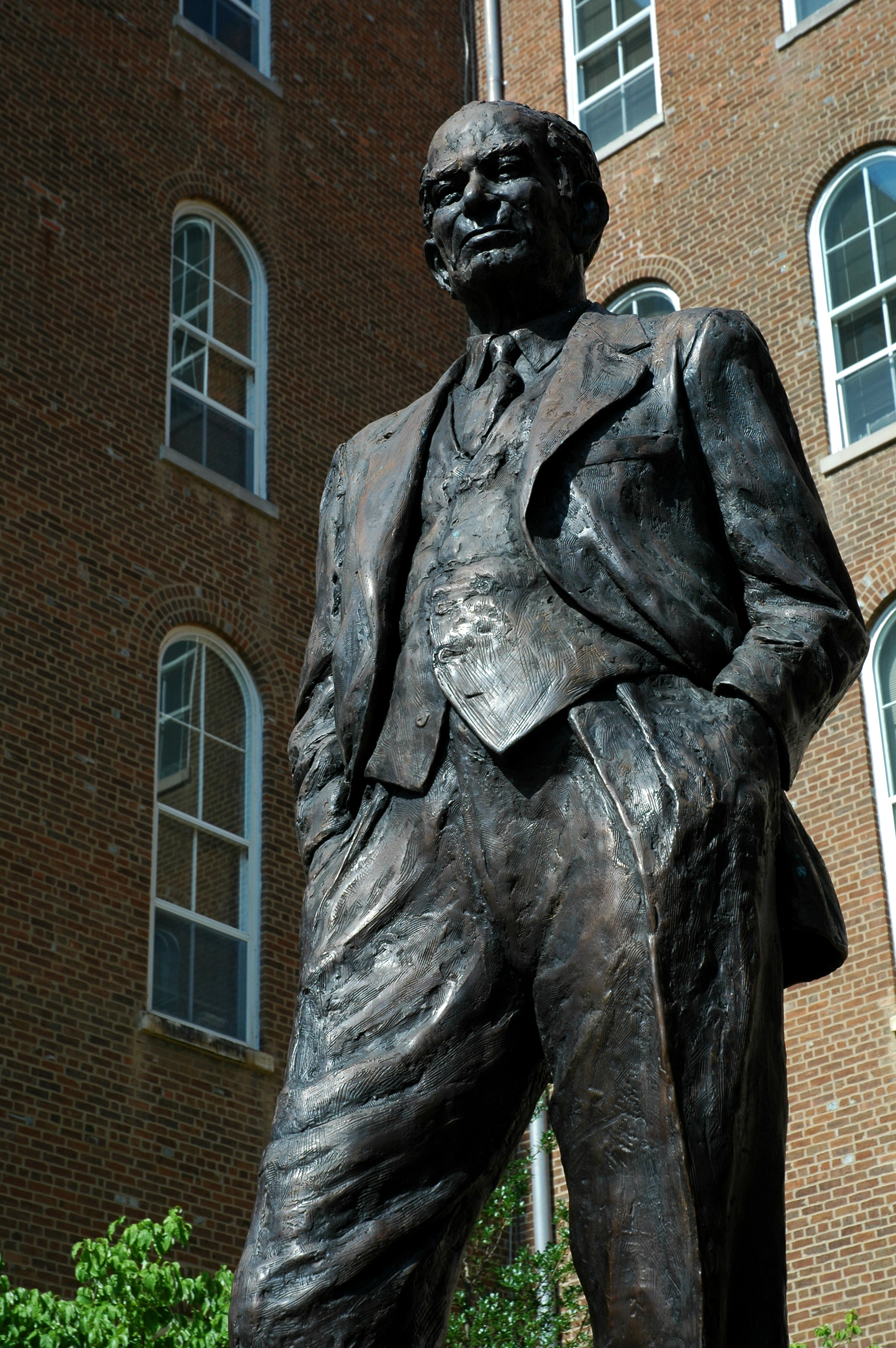
Statue on the Campus of the University of Arkansas

On October 21, 2002, in a speech at the dedication of the Fulbright Sculpture at the University of Arkansas, fellow Arkansan Bill Clinton said,

I admired him. I liked him. On the occasions when we disagreed, I loved arguing with him. I never loved getting in an argument with anybody as much in my entire life as I loved fighting with Bill Fulbright. I'm quite sure I always lost, and yet he managed to make me think I might have won.

During the removal of monuments during the George Floyd protests, Fulbright's legacy was examined by the University of Arkansas community with respect to an on-campus statue and the name of the J. William Fulbright College of Arts and Sciences. Fulbright was a 1925 alumnus, professor, and university president from 1939 to 1941. A spirited debate discussed his reputation as a racist who defended segregation and signed the Southern Manifesto. Defenders noted his record on international affairs and education, especially the Fulbright Program. One Fulbright biographer who knew Fulbright claimed he was not a racist, but supported segregationist policies expected of a Southern senator at the time, while another biographer summarized Fulbright's legacy as "a political giant in Arkansas, in both good and awful ways". A university panel voted to remove the statue and rename the college, but the University of Arkansas System Board of Trustees (which Fulbright once chaired as UA president) voted to keep both due to a state law requiring Arkansas General Assembly approval to remove monuments.

=== Other honors ===
- 1950 elected to the American Academy of Arts and Sciences
- 1953 elected to the American Philosophical Society
- 1982 awarded an honorary degree, doctor honoris causa, at the Norwegian Institute of Technology, later part of Norwegian University of Science and Technology.
- Association for Asian Studies (AAS), 1985 Award for Distinguished Contributions to Asian Studies
- 1987 Foreign Language Advocacy Award.
- 1992 awarded a doctor honoris causa degree at the University of Tampere, Finland.

=== Fulbright Program ===
The Fulbright Program was established in 1946 under legislation introduced by then-Senator J. William Fulbright of Arkansas. The Fulbright Program is sponsored by the Bureau of Educational and Cultural Affairs of the United States Department of State.

Approximately 294,000 "Fulbrighters", 111,000 from the United States and 183,000 from other countries, have participated in the Program since its inception over sixty years ago. The Fulbright Program awards approximately 6,000 new grants annually.

Currently, the Fulbright Program operates in over 155 countries worldwide.

The Thank You Fulbright project was created in April 2012 to provide an annual opportunity for alumni and friends of the Fulbright program to celebrate Fulbright's legacy.

== Publications ==
- Fulbright, J. William (1947). Heywood, Robert B. (ed.). The Works of the Mind: The Legislater. Chicago: University of Chicago Press. OCLC 752682744.
- Fulbright, J. William (1966), The Arrogance of Power, New York: Random House, ISBN 0-8129-9262-8
- Fulbright, J. William (1971). The Pentagon Propaganda Machine. New York: Vintage Books.
- Fulbright, J. William (1963). Prospects for the West, William L. Clayton Lectures on International Economic Affairs and Foreign Policy. 1962/1963. Harvard University Press.
- Fulbright, J. William (1964). Old Myths and New Realities and Other Commentaries. Random House.
- Fulbright, J. William (1972). The Crippled Giant;:American foreign policy and its domestic consequences. Harvard University Press.
- Fulbright, J. William; Tillman, Seth P. (1989). The Price of Empire. Pantheon. ISBN 978-0394572246.

== Notes ==
Party political offices
Preceded by Hattie Wyatt Caraway	Democratic nominee for U.S. Senator from Arkansas (Class 3); 1944, 1950, 1956, 1962, 1968	Succeeded by Dale Bumpers
U.S. House of Representatives
Preceded by Clyde T. Ellis	Member of the U.S. House of Representatives from Arkansas's 3rd congressional district 1943–1945	Succeeded by James William Trimble
U.S. Senate
Preceded by Hattie Caraway	U.S. senator (Class 3) from Arkansas; 1945–1974; Served alongside: John Little McClellan	Succeeded by Dale Bumpers
Honorary titles
Political offices
Preceded by Theodore F. Green	Chairman of the Senate Committee on Foreign Relations; 1959–1974	Succeeded by John Sparkman
