= Bakerville, Tennessee =

- Unincorporated community
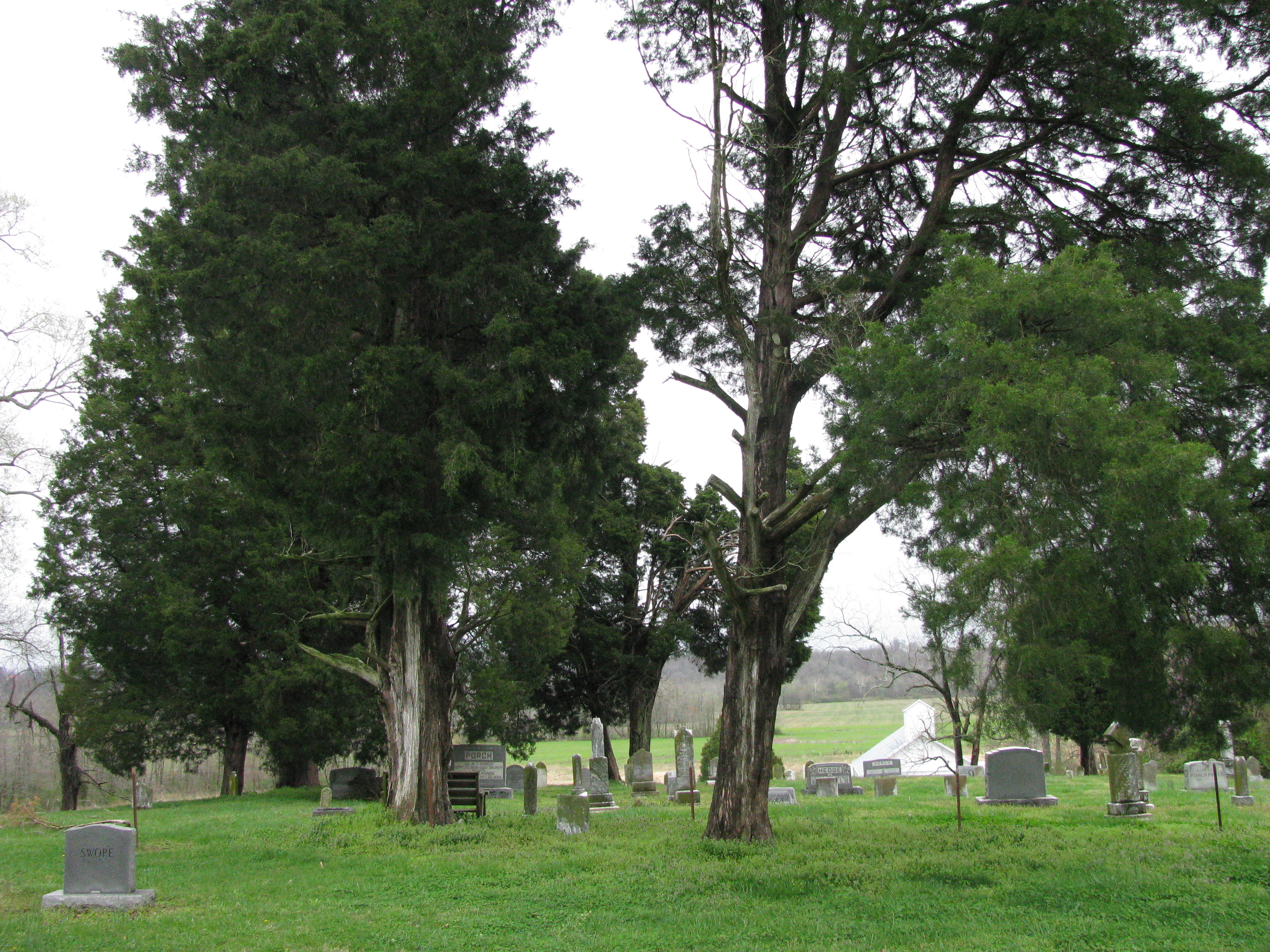
- Bakerville Cemetery

- Location within Tennessee Location within the United States
- Coordinates: 35°56′37″N 87°52′27″W
- Country: United States
- State: Tennessee
- County: Humphreys
- Elevation: 394 ft (120 m)
- Time zone: UTC-6 (Central (CST))
  - Summer (DST): UTC-5 (CDT)
- Area code: 931
- GNIS feature ID: 1276198

Bakerville is a rural unincorporated community in Humphreys County, Tennessee, United States. The community is several miles south of the county seat of Waverly and is near the confluence of the Buffalo and Duck Rivers.

== History ==
It is believed that the town's name goes back to the Baker families that resided in the area during the 19th century. At one point, no fewer than 80 Bakers lived in the small town circa 1880.

== Notable people ==
The first female senator in the United States, Hattie Caraway, was born here in 1878.
