= Paul Caraway =

United States Army general

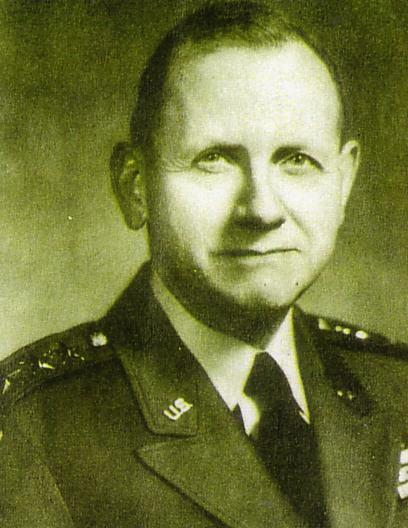
- Caraway in 1972
- Born: December 23, 1905; Jonesboro, Arkansas, U.S.
- Died: December 13, 1985 (aged 79); Washington, D.C., U.S.
- Relatives: Hattie Caraway (mother); Thaddeus H. Caraway (father)
- Military career
- Branch: United States Army
- Service years: 1929–1964
- Rank: Lieutenant general
- Nicknames: Small Paul Caraway; Typhoon Caraway
- Commands: 7th Infantry Division; Army Research and Development; United States Civil Administration of the Ryukyu Islands (February 16, 1961 – July 31, 1964)
- Conflicts: World War II
- Awards: Distinguished Service Medal

Paul Wyatt Caraway (December 23, 1905 – December 13, 1985) was an American military officer who was the 3rd High Commissioner of the United States Civil Administration of the Ryukyu Islands. He held the rank of lieutenant general in the United States Army.

He was the son of two influential Arkansas Senators, Hattie Caraway and Thaddeus H. Caraway. Caraway graduated from the United States Military Academy in 1929. He also graduated from Georgetown University with a law degree and taught law at West Point. He served on the General Staff for the United States Department of War before becoming deputy chief-of-staff to General Albert Coady Wedemeyer during World War II. He served in numerous other positions, including accompanying Vice President Richard Nixon on a tour of Asia. Following the Korean War, he became head of Army Research and Development. He never saw combat.

Caraway held major influence as High Commissioner of the Ryukyu Islands during the 1960s. He lowered electric prices and arrested several prominent banking figures for fraud, revamping the local banking industry in the process. Despite this, many Okinawans saw him as autocratic and see him as a symbol of absolute power in Okinawa's military rule. He refused to allow any increase in self-rule or autonomy, vetoing any bill from the local legislature that brought the islands closer to Japan and crushing autonomy movements. He resisted reform efforts from Ambassador to Japan Edwin O. Reischauer and President John F. Kennedy. He resigned from the office and the military in August 1964.

== Life ==
Caraway was born on December 23, 1905, in Jonesboro, Arkansas to Hattie Caraway, the first woman to be elected to the United States Senate and Thaddeus H. Caraway, also a Senator. He graduated from Georgetown University and was admitted to the bar in 1933. He practiced law in Heber Springs, Arkansas from 1965 to 1968 and then taught at Benjamin Franklin University in Washington, D.C.

Sometimes called "Small Paul Caraway" because of his height, he was a noted workaholic whose only real hobby included collecting firearms. The Hoover Institution houses the Paul Wyatt Caraway papers, which cover the period of his life from 1953 to 1964.

== Army career ==
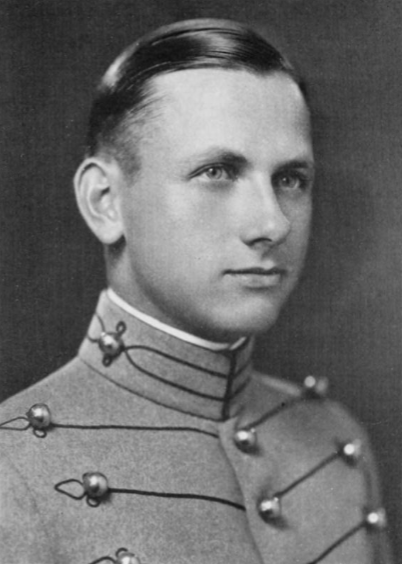
As a West Point cadet

Caraway graduated from the United States Military Academy at West Point in 1929. He received his commission as a Second Lieutenant the same year. From 1935 to 1937, he served with the 15th Infantry Regiment in Tianjin, China. From 1938 to 1942, Caraway taught law at West Point.

He served in the General Staff of the United States Department of War from 1942 to 1944. He also served as deputy chief of staff to General Albert Coady Wedemeyer in the China Burma India Theater of World War II. He was promoted to brigadier general in 1945. He received the Army Distinguished Service Medal for his service during the war. Despite his numerous staff positions during the war, Caraway never saw combat.

From 1945 to 1946 he headed the Chungking Liaison group. In 1947, he became an instructor at the National War College. In 1950, he was stationed in Trieste, Italy. Caraway accompanied then-Vice President of the United States Richard Nixon as part of his official party on a diplomatic mission to various countries in the eastern world.

Caraway commanded the 7th Infantry Division from August 1955 to April 1956 in Korea. From 1957 to 1958, he was chief of staff at the headquarters of the United States Forces in Japan. He received a Bronze Oak Leaf Cluster for his Distinguished Service Medal in 1964 as a lieutenant general. Following the Korean War, Caraway became the head of Army research and development. He retired as a lieutenant general.

== Tenure as High Commissioner ==
Caraway served as High Commissioner of the United States Civil Administration of the Ryukyu Islands from February 15, 1961, to July 31, 1964. When Caraway arrived on the island, he wore the three-star insignia of a lieutenant general, despite the fact that the United States Senate had not yet approved his promotion to that rank. However, he felt that his need to establish immediate authority with the Okinawa public warranted his assumption of advancement; the Senate did not learn of this episode and confirmed him retroactively the following day.

While Commissioner, Caraway considered Okinawa an essential area of United States military control that provided defense against China. He further considered the occupation to be a positive force for Okinawa. The economy of the island grew under his governing and he believed that a return of the island to Japan would result in authoritarian rule and discrimination against the natives. He viewed Ryukyu politicians as able but did not view them as equals in authority.

Caraway ordered the lowering of electricity rates and reformed the island banking system after having a number of prominent bankers arrested on charges of fraud. Before the war the Ryukyus had the lowest per capita income of all Japanese provinces; under Caraway, the island enjoyed one of the highest per capita incomes in all of Asia. Though he brought economic prosperity, many Okinawans and Japanese accused him of autocracy. He squelched a local autonomy movement, earning him criticism from the leftist movement and praise from local businessmen. He also combated and repressed any movements in favor of reverting the islands to Japanese rule. He vetoed bills from the Ryukyu legislature that would have brought the island closer to Japan, replacing them with directives distancing it. His reputation eventually earned him the nickname "Typhoon Caraway" among islanders. He resisted any attempts to increase local self-government throughout his tenure, announcing "Okinawan self-government is nothing but a legend."

He had an ongoing rivalry with Ambassador to Japan Edwin O. Reischauer and frequently withheld key information from the embassy. Reischauer favored Kennedy administration plans to give the island more autonomy and allow the Japanese government to provide the island with greater financial aid; Caraway opposed all such measures, believing that they would eventually strip the United States of one of its most strategic bases. Reischauer referred to Caraway as a "bull-headed man" and "autocratic" in his memoirs, with Caraway firing back that "he's useless. He's a menace, because he thinks he knows everything... and he knows nothing." Caraway went so far as to accuse Reischauer of entering into a "conspiracy with the Japanese" to force American forces off the Ryukyus. In 1962, President of the United States John F. Kennedy began an effort to give the residents of the Ryukyu islands greater autonomy. One of his methods was to restrict Caraway's power of veto by allowing him to overrule the Ryukyu Legislature only when necessary to protect the security interests of the United States.

When Caraway suggested in a March 1963 speech that residents who desired autonomy for the Ryukyu Islands were incompetent to run a government for themselves, a large group of government workers began calling for his removal from office. A severe drought the same year forced Caraway to begin rationing water when reserves fell before 40 percent of capacity. He retired from the position because of physical disability on August 1, 1964, and Lieutenant General Albert Watson II succeeded him.

== Retirement and death ==
After his retirement from the Army, Caraway and his wife settled in Heber Springs, Arkansas. They moved to the District of Columbia area in 1967 where he became a professor at Benjamin Franklin University, where he taught business administration. After a few years, he resigned his position due to illness. He died in Washington, DC on December 13, 1985, at the age of 79.
