= 1962 United States Senate election in Arkansas =

1962 U.S. Senate election in Arkansas
- November 6, 1962
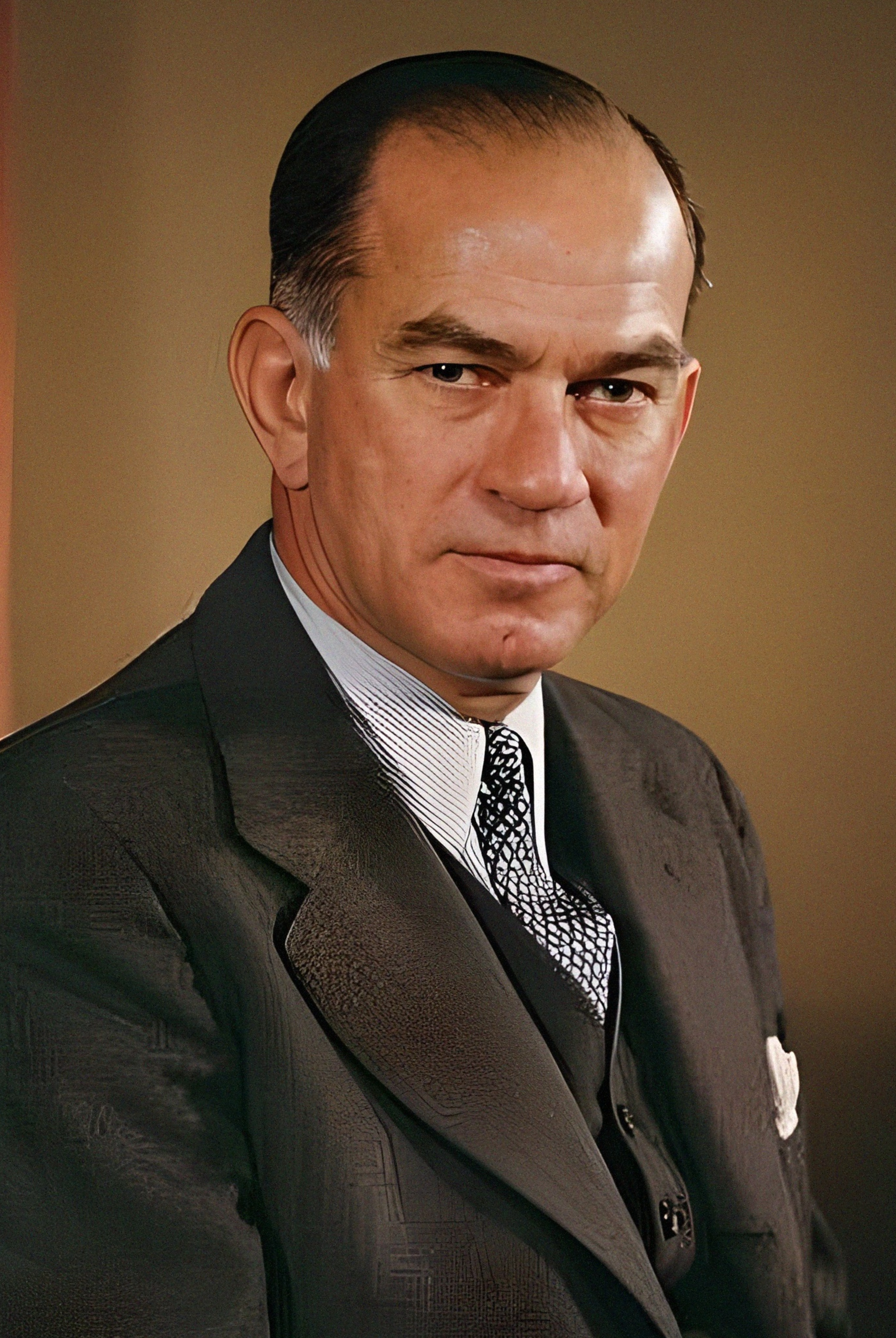

Nominee	J. William Fulbright	Kenneth G. Jones
Party	Democratic	Republican
Popular vote	214,867	98,013
Percentage	68.67%	31.33%
- County results Fulbright: 50–60% 60–70% 70–80% 80–90%
U.S. senator before election
J. William Fulbright
Democratic
Elected U.S. Senator
J. William Fulbright
Democratic

The 1962 United States Senate election in Arkansas took place on November 6, 1962. Incumbent Senator J. William Fulbright won a fourth term in office, defeating primary challenger Winston G. Chandler and Republican Party nominee Kenneth G. Jones without much threat.

== Democratic primary ==
=== Candidates ===
- J. William Fulbright, incumbent Senator since 1945
- Winston G. Chandler

=== Results ===
1962 Democratic U.S. Senate primary
Party	Candidate	Votes	%
Democratic	J. William Fulbright (inc.)	253,751	66.13%
Democratic	Winston G. Chandler	129,987	33.87%
Total votes		383,738	100.00%

== General election ==
=== Results ===
1962 Democratic U.S. Senate election
Party	Candidate	Votes	%
Democratic	J. William Fulbright (inc.)	214,867	68.67%
Republican	Kenneth G. Jones	98,013	31.33%
Total votes		312,880	100.00%

== See also ==
- 1962 United States Senate elections
