= Ralph T. O'Neil =

American lawyer and Commnander of the American Legion

- O'Neil in 1934

National Commander of The American Legion
- In office 1930–1931
- Preceded by: O. L. Bodenhamer
- Succeeded by: Henry L. Stevens, Jr.

Personal details
- Born: Ralph Thomas O'Neil

Military service
- Allegiance: United States
- Branch/service: United States Army
- Years of service: 1917-1919
- Rank: Private to Captain
- Unit: 11th Infantry, 5th division
- Battles/wars: Battle of Saint-Mihiel

Ralph Thomas "Dyke" O'Neil was the National Commander of The American Legion from 1930 to 1931.

== Biography ==
O'Neil entered the U.S. Army in 1917, and trained at Fort Sheridan, now the Sheridan Reserve Center. He served in the Western Front of World War 1, in France. He served in Vosges and Toul, the Battle of Saint-Mihiel and the Meuse–Argonne offensive. He was a well known lawyer in Topeka, Kansas.

== Personal life ==
O'Neil was born in Osage City, Kansas on August 8, 1888 to Thomas J. and Margaret (Hughes) O'Neil. He was a Freemason, Presbyterian, Democrat, and a member of Delta Tau Delta. He married Margaret Heiser on August 15, 1919, and had two sons with her, Robert H. and Ralph T. O'Neil died May 26, 1940 in Topeka.

Non-profit organization positions
Preceded by O. L. Bodenhamer	National Commander of The American Legion; 1930 – 1931	Succeeded by Henry L. Stevens, Jr.
