= 1944 United States Senate election in Arkansas =

1944 U.S. Senate election in Arkansas
- November 7, 1944
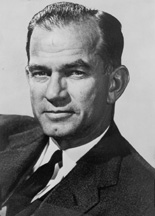

| Nominee | J. William Fulbright | Victor Wade |
| Party | Democratic | Republican |
| Popular vote | 182,499 | 31,942 |
| Percentage | 85.10% | 14.90% |
- County results Fulbright: 50–60% 60–70% 70–80% 80–90% >90%
U.S. senator before election
Hattie Caraway
Democratic
Elected U.S. Senator
J. William Fulbright
Democratic

The 1944 United States Senate election in Arkansas took place on November 7, 1944. Incumbent Senator Hattie Caraway ran for a third term in office but was eliminated in the Democratic primary. U.S. Representative J. William Fulbright defeated Governor Homer Martin Adkins in the Democratic runoff. It is the last time where an elected incumbent Senator placed third or worse in a primary until the 2026 United States Senate election in Louisiana. (Note: Maurice J. Murphy Jr. went on to place third in the Republican primary of the 1962 United States Senate special election in New Hampshire, though he was appointed to fill a vacancy in December 1961 and was attempting to run for a full term when he lost the primary.)

Fulbright easily defeated Republican Victor Wade in the general election, in a landslide victory typical for Arkansas Democrats at the time.

== Democratic primary ==
=== Candidates ===
- Homer Martin Adkins, Governor of Arkansas since 1941
- T. H. Barton (Note: Erroneously listed as "L. H. Barton" in the official election results.), former colonel and oilman
- Hattie Caraway, incumbent U.S. Senator since 1931
- J. William Fulbright, U.S. Representative from Fayetteville and former University of Arkansas professor
- J. Rosser Venable, candidate for Senate in 1936

=== Results ===
1944 Democratic U.S. Senate primary
| Party | Candidate | Votes | % |
|---|---|---|---|
| Democratic | J. William Fulbright | 67,168 | 36.33% |
| Democratic | Homer Martin Adkins | 49,795 | 26.93% |
| Democratic | T. H. Barton | 43,053 | 23.28% |
| Democratic | Hattie Caraway (incumbent) | 24,881 | 13.46% |
| Total votes | | 184,897 | 100.00% |

=== Runoff ===
1944 Democratic U.S. Senate primary
| Party | Candidate | Votes | % |
|---|---|---|---|
| Democratic | J. William Fulbright | 117,121 | 57.90% |
| Democratic | Homer Martin Adkins | 85,163 | 42.10% |
| Total votes | | 202,284 | 100.00% |

== General election ==
=== Results ===
1944 U.S. Senate election in Arkansas
| Party | Candidate | Votes | % |
|---|---|---|---|
| Democratic | J. William Fulbright | 182,499 | 85.10% |
| Republican | Victor Wade | 31,942 | 14.90% |
| Total votes | | 214,441 | 100.00% |

== See also ==
- 1944 United States Senate elections
