= 1938 United States Senate election in Arkansas =

1938 U.S. Senate election in Arkansas
- November 8, 1938
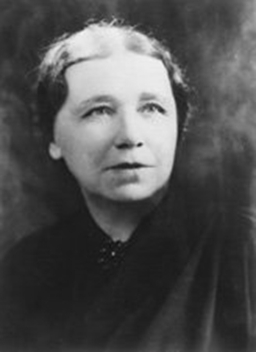

Nominee	Hattie Caraway	C. D. Atkinson
Party	Democratic	Republican
Popular vote	122,883	14,290
Percentage	89.58%	10.42%
- County results Caraway: 50–60% 60–70% 70–80% 80–90% >90%
U.S. senator before election
Hattie Caraway
Democratic
Elected U.S. Senator
Hattie Caraway
Democratic

The 1938 United States Senate election in Arkansas took place on November 8, 1938. Incumbent Senator Hattie Caraway ran for a second term in office. After narrowly defeating U.S. Representative John Little McClellan in the Democratic primary, she easily won the general election over Republican C.D. Atkinson. McClellan would later be elected at the other Senate seat in 1942 and served with Caraway until 1945.

Caraway, already the first woman elected to the U.S. Senate, became the first woman elected to a second term in office.

== Democratic primary ==
=== Candidates ===
- Hattie Caraway, incumbent U.S. Senator since 1931
- John L. McClellan, U.S. Representative from Malvern
- J. Rosser Venable

=== Results ===
Democratic primary results map by county: Carraway: 40–50%; 50–60%; 60–70%; 70–80%; McClellan: 40–50%; 50–60%; 60–70%; 70–80%; Venable: 30–40%

1938 Democratic U.S. Senate primary
Party	Candidate	Votes	%
Democratic	Hattie Caraway (incumbent)	145,472	51.04%
Democratic	John L. McClellan	134,708	47.27%
Democratic	J. Rosser Venable	4,813	1.69%
Total votes		284,993	100.00%

== General election ==
=== Results ===
1938 U.S. Senate election in Arkansas
Party	Candidate	Votes	%
Democratic	Hattie Caraway (incumbent)	122,883	89.58%
Republican	C. D. Atkinson	14,290	10.42%
Total votes		137,173	100.00%

== See also ==
- 1938 United States Senate elections
