= Hattie Caraway =

American politician (1878–1950)

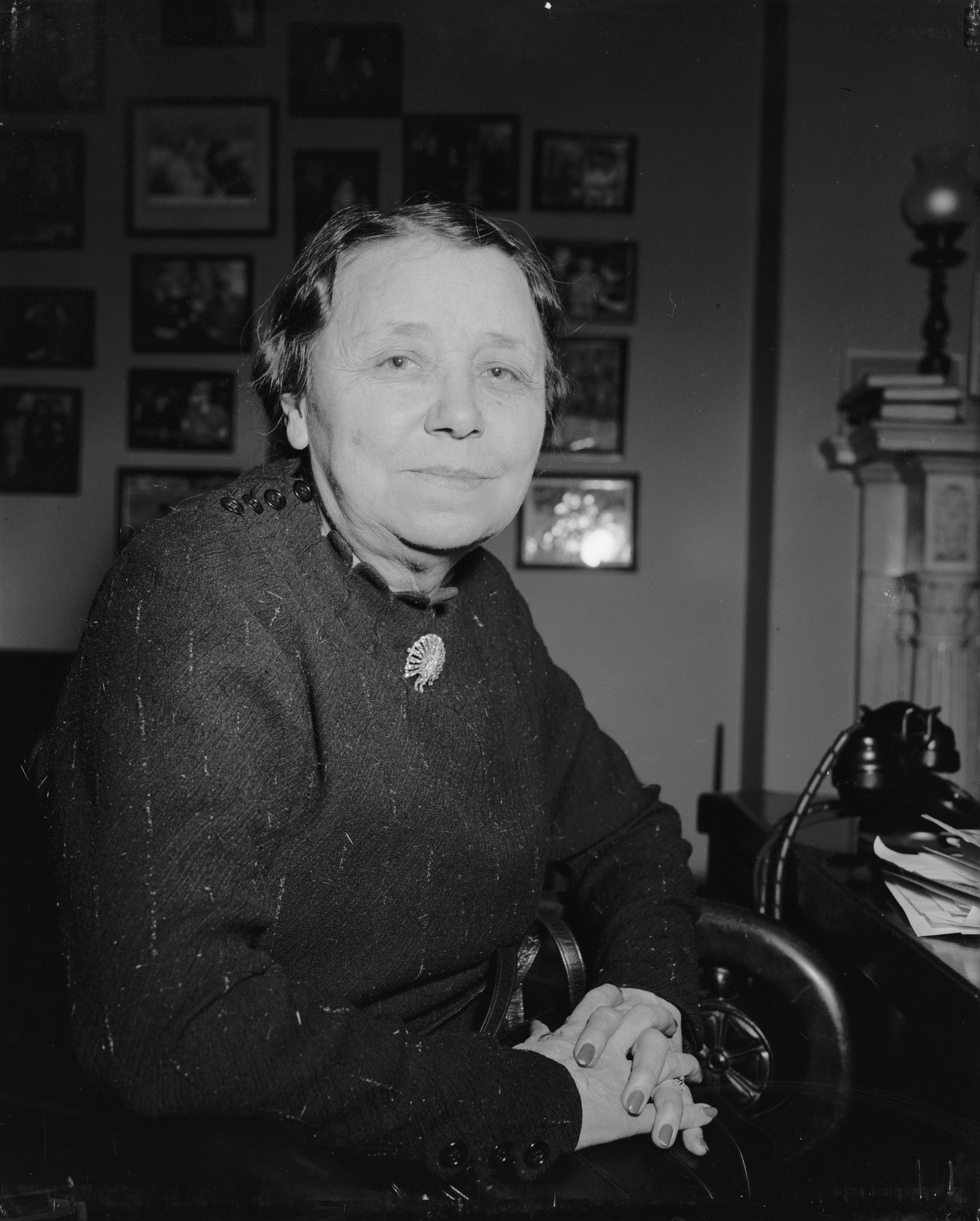
- Caraway in 1940

United States Senator from Arkansas
- In office November 13, 1931 – January 3, 1945
- Preceded by: Thaddeus H. Caraway
- Succeeded by: William Fulbright

Personal details
- Born: Hattie Ophelia Wyatt; February 1, 1878 Bakerville, Tennessee, U.S.
- Died: December 21, 1950 (aged 72) Falls Church, Virginia, U.S.
- Party: Democratic
- Spouse: Thaddeus H. Caraway (m. 1902; died 1931)
- Children: 3, including Paul
- Education: Ebenezer College (attended); Dickson Normal College (BA)

Hattie Ophelia Wyatt Caraway (February 1, 1878 – December 21, 1950) was an American politician who was United States Senator from Arkansas from 1931 to 1945. She was the first woman elected to the Senate, and the first woman to be reelected to the Senate. She was also the first woman to preside over the Senate. She won reelection to a full term in 1932 with the active support of fellow Senator Huey Long, of neighboring Louisiana.

== Early life ==
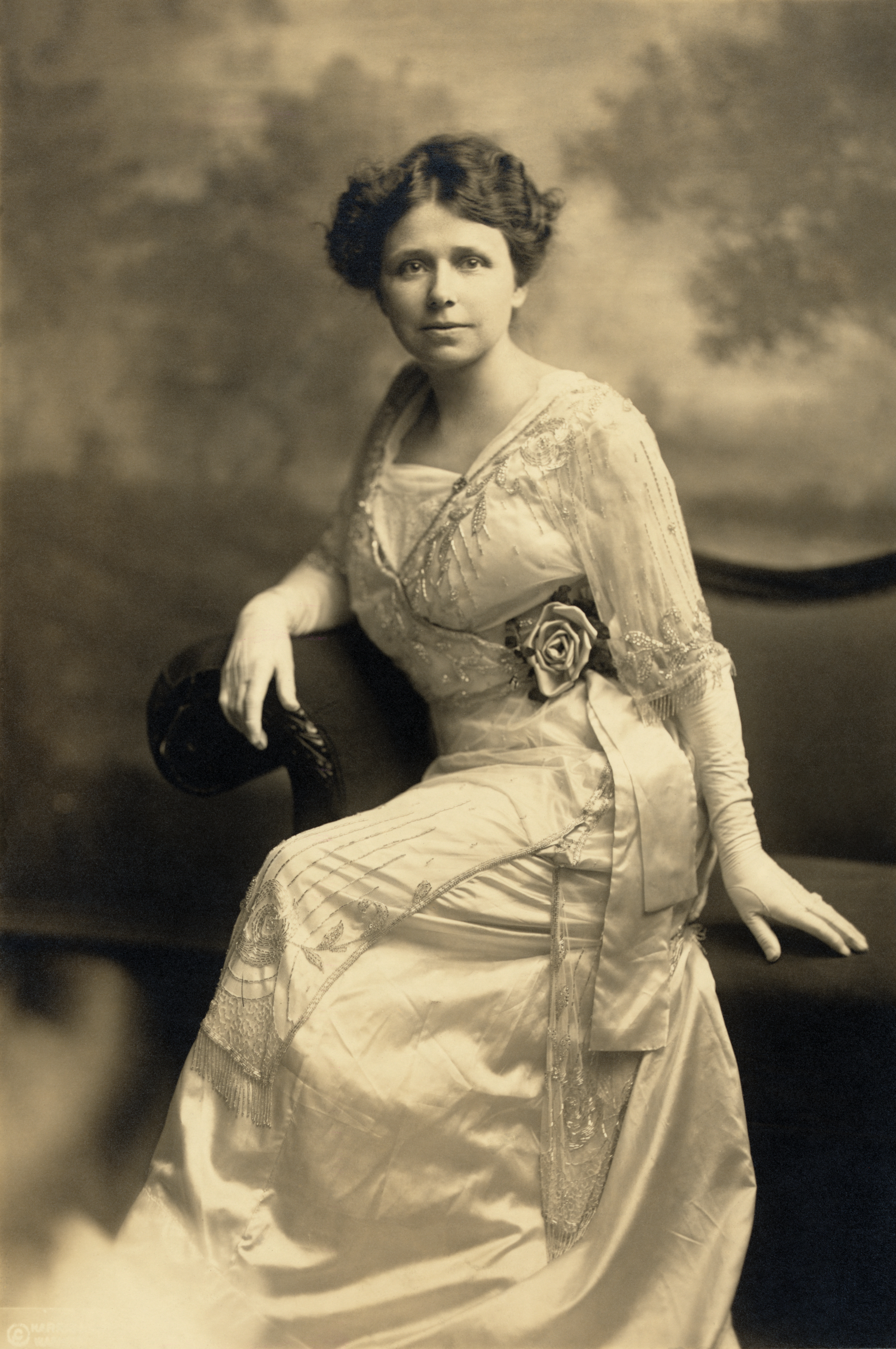
Hattie Caraway in 1914

Hattie Wyatt was born near rural Bakerville in Humphreys County in west-central Tennessee, the daughter of William Carroll Wyatt, a farmer and shopkeeper, and the former Lucy Mildred Burch. At the age of four, she moved with her family to Hustburg in Humphreys County. Despite her family's relative poverty, she had always hoped to pursue higher education, which was made possible through the generosity of a wealthy aunt. After attending a one-room schoolhouse and Ebenezer Church in Hustburg, she transferred to Dickson (Tennessee) Normal College, wherein 1896 she received her Bachelor of Arts degree. She taught school for a time before in 1902 marrying Thaddeus H. Caraway, whom she had met in college. They had three sons: Paul, Forrest, and Robert; Paul and Forrest became generals in the United States Army. The couple settled in Jonesboro, Arkansas, where he established a legal practice while she cared for the children, tended the household and kitchen garden, and helped to oversee the family's cotton farm.

The Caraways established a second home Riversdale at Riverdale Park, Maryland. Thaddeus was elected to the United States House of Representatives in 1912, and he served in that office until 1921 when he became a U.S. senator. Although she took an interest in her husband's political career, Hattie Caraway avoided the capital's social and political life as well as the campaign for women's suffrage. She recalled that "after equal suffrage I just added voting to cooking and sewing and other household duties."

== U.S. Senator ==
Thaddeus H. Caraway died in office in 1931. Arkansas governor Harvey Parnell appointed Hattie Caraway to the vacant seat, and she was sworn into office on December 9. She was the first woman appointed to the Senate to succeed her dead former husband.

=== Elections ===
==== January 1932 ====
With the Democratic Party of Arkansas's backing, she easily won a special election in January 1932 for the remaining months of the term, becoming the first woman elected to the Senate.

==== 1932 ====
In May 1932, Caraway surprised Arkansas politicians by announcing that she would run for a full term in the upcoming election, joining a field already crowded with prominent candidates who had assumed she would step aside. She told reporters, "The time has passed when a woman should be placed in a position and kept there only while someone else is being groomed for the job." When she was invited by Vice President Charles Curtis to preside over the Senate she took advantage of the situation to announce that she would run for reelection. Populist former Governor and Senator Huey Long of neighboring Louisiana traveled to Arkansas on a seven-day campaign swing on her behalf. She was the first female senator to preside over the body as well as the first to chair a committee (Senate Committee on Enrolled Bills). Lacking any significant political backing, Caraway accepted the offer of help from Long, whose efforts to limit incomes of the wealthy and increase aid to the poor she had supported. Long was also motivated by sympathy for the widow and his ambition to extend his influence into the home state of his party rival, Senator Joseph Robinson, who had been Al Smith's vice-presidential candidate in 1928. Bringing his colorful and flamboyant campaign style to Arkansas, Long stumped the state with Caraway for a week just before the Democratic primary. He helped her to amass nearly twice as many votes as her closest opponent.

Long effectively used a method to quiet crying babies at campaign stops in Arkansas to encourage voter interest:

Mrs. Caraway would never forget nor cease to laugh over the plans we made for caring for obstreperous infants in the audience so that their mothers might listen to the speeches without the crowds being disturbed. I remember when I saw her notice one of our campaigners take charge of the first baby. The child began fretting and then began to cry. One of the young men accompanying us immediately gave it a drink of water. The child quieted for a bit and resumed a whimper, whereupon the same campaign worker handed the baby an all-day sucker, which it immediately grasped and soon fell asleep. Mrs. Caraway did not understand that it was a matter of design until it had been repeated several times.

Caraway went on to win the general election in November, with the accompanying victory of Franklin D. Roosevelt as U.S. President. However, she effectively clinched a full term when she won the Democratic primary by a nearly 2-to-1 margin. In those days, like most of the South, Arkansas was a virtual one-party state dominated by the Democrats, and the Democratic primary was the real contest.

==== 1938 ====
In 1938, Caraway entered a tough fight for reelection, challenged by Representative John Little McClellan, who argued that a man could more effectively promote the state's interests using the slogan, "Arkansas Needs Another Man in the Senate!" With backing from government employees, women's groups, and unions, Caraway won a narrow victory in the primary and took the general election with 89.4 percent of the vote over the Republican C. D. Atkinson of Fayetteville in Washington County. In doing so, she became not only the first woman to be elected to the Senate, but also the first to be reelected.

==== 1944 ====
In her bid for reelection in 1944, Caraway placed a poor fourth in the Democratic primary and lost to freshman U.S. Representative J. William Fulbright of Arkansas's 3rd congressional district. He was the young, dynamic former president of the University of Arkansas at Fayetteville who had already gained a national reputation. To claim the seat, Fulbright defeated sitting Governor Homer Martin Adkins and then the Republican Victor Wade of Batesville. The lack of visibility with her constituents may have been the primary reason that Caraway lost the 1944 nomination.

=== Tenure ===
Caraway's Senate committee assignments included Agriculture and Forestry, Commerce, and Enrolled Bills and Library, which she chaired. She sustained a special interest in relief for farmers, flood control, and veterans' benefits, all of direct concern to her constituents, and cast her votes for nearly every New Deal measure. In 1938, she joined fellow Southerners in a filibuster against an anti-lynching bill that year. Although she carefully prepared herself for Senate work, Caraway spoke infrequently and rarely made speeches on the floor but built a reputation as an honest and sincere senator. She was sometimes portrayed by patronizing reporters as "Silent Hattie" or "the quiet grandmother who never said anything or did anything." She explained her reticence as unwillingness "to take a minute away from the men. The poor dears love it so."

During her tenure in the Senate, three other women – Long's widow, Rose McConnell Long, Dixie Bibb Graves, and Gladys Pyle – held brief tenures of two years or less in the Senate, but none of them overlapped, and so there were never more than two women in the body. She supported Roosevelt's foreign policy, arguing for his Lend-Lease bill from her perspective as a mother with two sons in the United States Army. While encouraging women to contribute to the war effort, Caraway insisted that caring for the home and family was a woman's primary task. Yet her consciousness of women's disadvantages was evident as early as 1931, when, upon being assigned the same Senate desk that had been briefly occupied by the first widow ever appointed to take her husband's place, she commented privately, "I guess they wanted as few of them contaminated as possible." Moreover, in 1943, Caraway became the first woman legislator to cosponsor the Equal Rights Amendment. In early 1944, she was an early sponsor of the Servicemen's Readjustment Act of 1944, popularly known as the G.I. Bill. However, by supporting the bill, she placed herself in opposition to powerful congressmen who condemned the bill for being socialist.

On her final day in the Senate, she received a rare standing ovation from her all-male colleagues. Roosevelt then appointed her to the Employees' Compensation Commission, and in 1946, President Harry S. Truman gave her a post on the Employees' Compensation Appeals Board, on which she served until suffering a stroke in January 1950. She died on December 21 of the same year in Falls Church, Virginia, and was buried in Oaklawn Cemetery in Jonesboro, Arkansas.

== Legacy ==
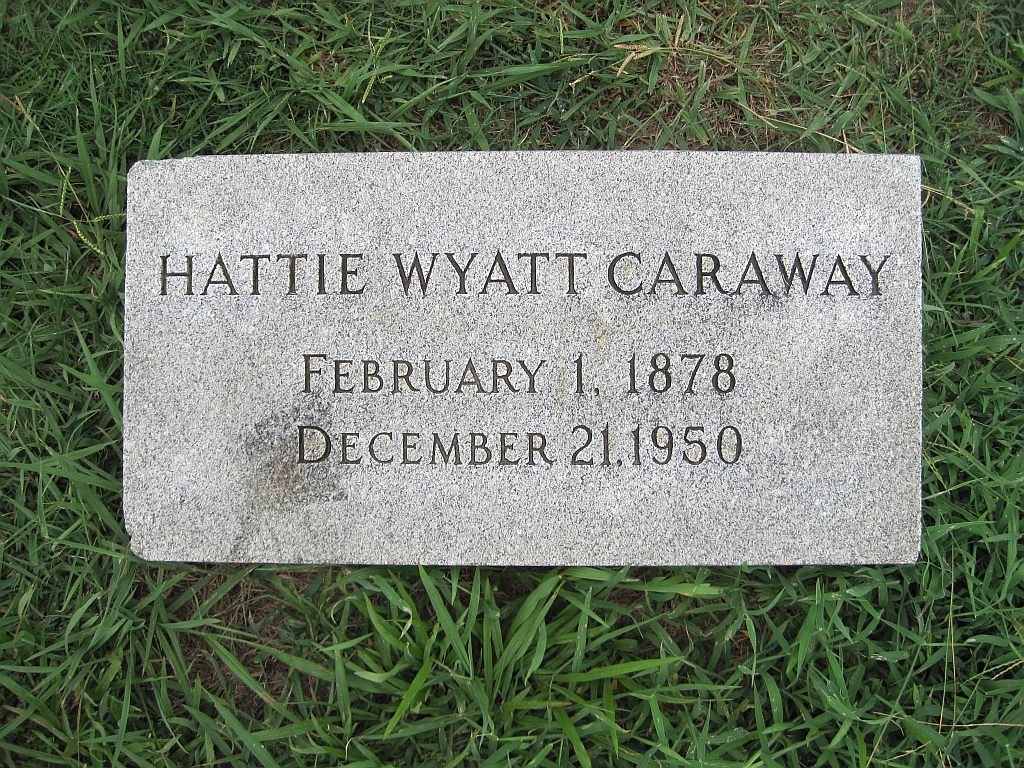
Grave of Hattie Caraway

Caraway was a prohibitionist and voted against anti-lynching legislation along with other Southern Democratic senators. She was generally a supporter of the New Deal. Caraway's defiance of the Arkansas establishment in insisting that she was more than a temporary stand-in for her husband enabled her to set a valuable precedent for women in politics. Although she remained at the margins of power, Caraway's diligent and capable attention to Senate responsibilities won the respect of her colleagues, encouraged advocates of wider public roles for women, and demonstrated that political skills were not the exclusive property of men.

On February 21, 2001, the United States Postal Service issued a 76-cent Distinguished Americans series postage stamp in her honor.

Her gravesite at Oaklawn Cemetery in Jonesboro, Arkansas, was listed in 2007 on the National Register of Historic Places.

On March 18, 2026, a historical marker honoring her was unveiled at the V.C. Kays House on the campus of Arkansas State University. The marker was the fifth of eleven to be placed across Arkansas as part of the recognition of the 250th anniversary of the founding of the United States.

== Electoral history ==
January 1932 United States Senate special election in Arkansas
Party	Candidate	Votes	%
Democratic	Hattie Caraway (incumbent)	31,133	91.62
Independent	Rex Floyd	1,752	5.16
Independent	Sam D. Carson	1,095	3.22
Total votes		33,980	100.00
Democratic hold			

November 1932 United States Senate election in Arkansas
Party	Candidate	Votes	%
Democratic	Hattie Caraway (incumbent)	187,994	89.71
Republican	John W. White	21,558	10.29
Total votes		209,552	100.00
Democratic hold			

1938 United States Senate election in Arkansas
Primary election
Party	Candidate	Votes	%
Democratic	Hattie Caraway (incumbent)	145,472	51.04
Democratic	John L. McClellan	134,708	47.27
Democratic	J. Rosser Venable	4,813	1.69
Total votes		284,993	100.00
General election
Democratic	Hattie Caraway (incumbent)	122,883	89.58
Republican	C.D. Atkinson	14,290	10.42
Total votes		137,173	100.00
Democratic hold			

1944 United States Senate election in Arkansas
Primary election
Party	Candidate	Votes	%
Democratic	J. William Fulbright	67,168	36.33
Democratic	Homer Martin Adkins	49,795	26.93
Democratic	L.H. Barton	43,053	23.28
Democratic	Hattie Caraway (incumbent)	24,881	13.46
Total votes		184,897	100.00

== Notes ==
U.S. Senate
Preceded by Thaddeus H. Caraway	United States Senator (Class 3) from Arkansas; 1931–1945; Served alongside: Joseph Taylor Robinson, John E. Miller, G. Lloyd Spencer, John McClellan	Succeeded by J. William Fulbright
Preceded by Arthur Vandenberg	Chair of the Senate Enrolled Bills Committee; 1933–1945	Succeeded by Charles Andrews
Party political offices
Preceded by Thaddeus H. Caraway	Democratic nominee for U.S. Senator from Arkansas (Class 3); 1932 (special), 1932 (general), 1938	Succeeded by J. William Fulbright
