= Thaddeus H. Caraway =

American politician (1871–1931)

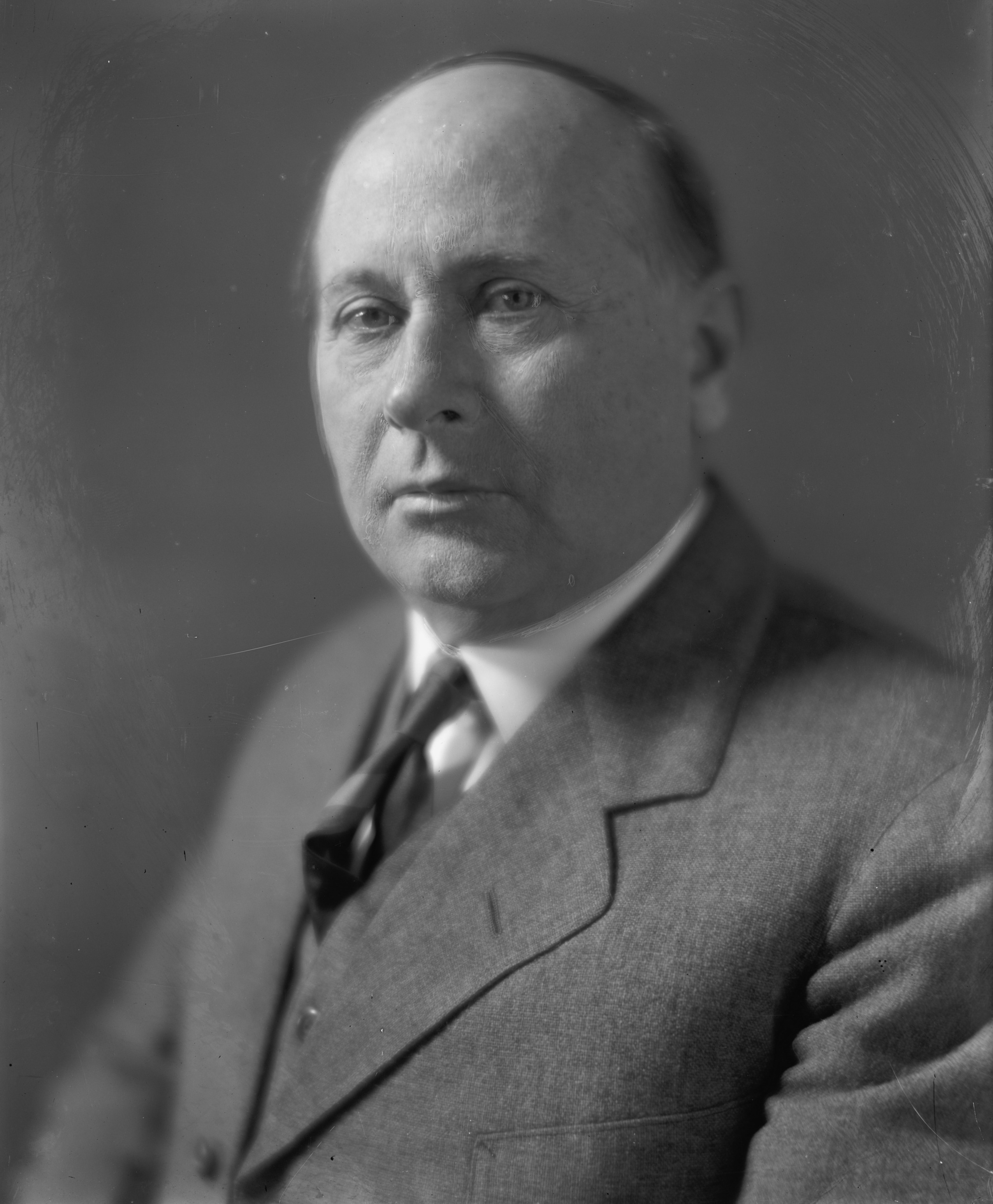
- Caraway, 1905–1931

United States Senator from Arkansas
- In office March 4, 1921 – November 6, 1931
- Preceded by: William F. Kirby
- Succeeded by: Hattie Caraway

Member of the U.S. House of Representatives from Arkansas's 1st district
- In office March 4, 1913 – March 3, 1921
- Preceded by: Robert B. Macon
- Succeeded by: William J. Driver

Personal details
- Born: Thaddeus Horatius Caraway; October 17, 1871 Springhill, Stoddard County, Missouri, U.S.
- Died: November 6, 1931 (aged 60) Little Rock, Arkansas, U.S.
- Resting place: Oaklawn Cemetery in Jonesboro, Arkansas
- Party: Democratic
- Spouse: Hattie Wyatt
- Children: Paul Caraway; Forrest Caraway; Robert Caraway
- Parent(s): Tolbert and Mary Ellen Caraway
- Education: Dickson (Tennessee) Normal College
- Occupation: Educator; Lawyer

Thaddeus Horatius Caraway (October 17, 1871 – November 6, 1931) was an American politician who represented the state of Arkansas first in the U.S. House of Representatives from 1913 to 1921 and then in the U.S. Senate from 1921 until his death in 1931. He belonged to the Democratic Party.

== Life and career ==
Caraway was born on a farm near Springhill, in Stoddard County, in southeastern Missouri, and was the youngest of three children. His father, Tolbert Caraway, was a country physician and Confederate veteran; his mother was Mary Ellen Caraway. When he was six months old, Tolbert Caraway was assassinated in a feud, and the family was left impoverished. Thaddeus worked as a farmhand from the age of seven, then later as a railroad section hand, a farm tenant, and as a sharecropper. He studied at night and attended the common schools as a boy.

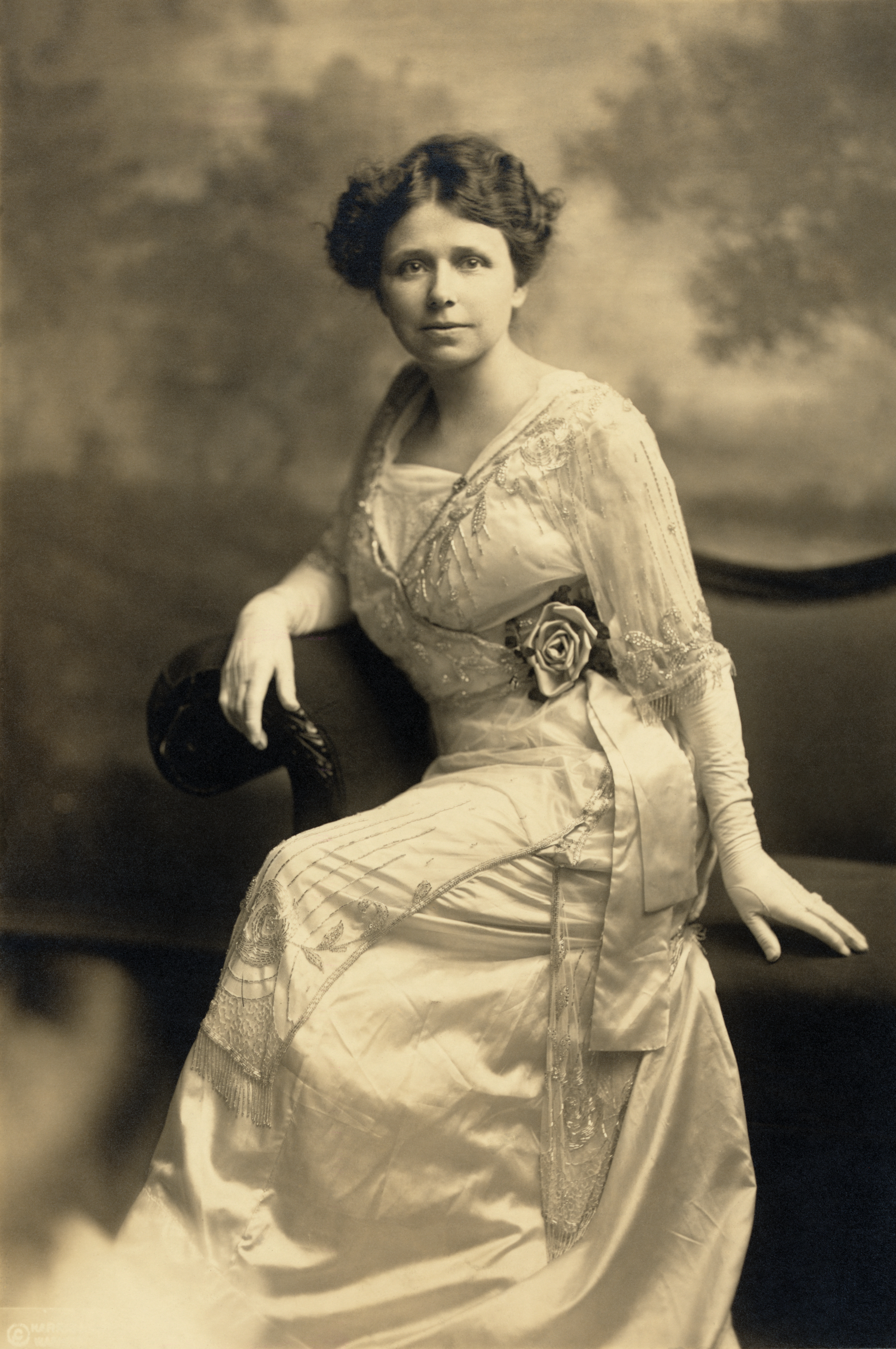
His wife, Hattie Wyatt Caraway, who would go on to be the first woman elected to a full term as a United States senator.

In 1883, he moved with his parents to Clay County, in northeastern Arkansas. In 1896, he graduated from Dickson College in Tennessee, and taught in country schools until 1899. He studied law and was admitted to the bar in 1900 after he had launched his practice in Osceola in Mississippi County, in eastern Arkansas. Later that year he moved to Lake City in Craighead County, Arkansas, and in 1901 he moved again, to Jonesboro, the county seat of Craighead County. Each time, he continued his practice. In 1902, he married the former Hattie Wyatt, whom he had met at Dickson College. Together, they had three sons: Robert Easley, Forrest, and Paul Wyatt.

From 1908 to 1912, Caraway served as the prosecuting attorney for the state's second judicial circuit. He was elected to Congress in 1912 from the Arkansas's 1st congressional district, taking office as a representative in 1913 and serving until 1921. Rather than seek renomination in 1920, he chose to run for the Senate as a Wilson Democrat, and won; he was reelected in 1926. The same year, he purchased Riversdale at Riverdale Park, Maryland.

In Congress, Caraway was a progressive and a reformer. He was a vocal critic of the Harding administration and the Teapot Dome scandal, and he chaired a worked for laws requiring disclosure of activities by lobbyists. He co-authored the McNary–Haugen Farm Relief Bill to provide price supports for farm products, but it was vetoed by President Calvin Coolidge. He supported American entrance to the League of Nations; bonuses for World War I veterans; and the Eighteenth, Nineteenth, and Twentieth Amendments. However, like other Southern Democrats, Caraway was a supporter of racial discrimination against African Americans. On May 15, 1921, he introduced a bill to prohibit the enlistment of African Americans to the US Army and the US Navy. Furthermore, during the 66th Congress, Caraway offered H.R. 8112, which proposed segregating public and private transportation in Washington, DC. During the same Congress, Caraway sponsored H.R. 8113, which directed the "Commissioners of the District of Columbia to set apart certain sections, streets, blocks, or parts of blocks of the District of Columbia in which shall reside members of the Negro race only, and other sections... in which members of the Negro race shall not reside...."

He served until his death from a blood clot in his coronary artery. He died in Little Rock on November 6, 1931, and lay in state in the Arkansas State Capitol on November 8. He is buried in Jonesboro. His widow, Hattie Caraway, was appointed to fill his seat by Governor Harvey Parnell and was elected, with critical help from US Senator Huey Pierce Long, Jr., of Louisiana, to fill out his term, becoming the first woman elected to the Senate and only the second to ever serve as a senator.

== Literary connection ==
Despite Caraway's admirable accomplishments, during his early days as a senator, he also gained national prominence for being a "modest and self-contained" man, a politician with "the shortest sketch in [the] Congressional Directory." The headline of a story detailing that distinction was later found pasted in the personal scrapbooks kept by the iconic American author F. Scott Fitzgerald, whose masterwork The Great Gatsby is narrated by Nick Carraway, a protagonist whose surname was originally spelled "Caraway" in Fitzgerald's earliest draft.

== See also ==
- List of members of the United States Congress who died in office (1900–1949)

Party political offices
Preceded by William F. Kirby	Democratic nominee for U.S. Senator from Arkansas (Class 3); 1920, 1926	Succeeded by Hattie Wyatt Caraway
U.S. House of Representatives
Preceded by Robert B. Macon	Member of the U.S. House of Representatives from Arkansas's 1st congressional district March 4, 1913 – March 3, 1921	Succeeded by William J. Driver
U.S. Senate
Preceded by William F. Kirby	U.S. senator (Class 3) from Arkansas; March 4, 1921 – November 6, 1931; Served alongside: Joseph T. Robinson	Succeeded by Hattie Caraway
