= Bird Creek (Piney River tributary) =

River in the United States of America

Coordinates: 35.851177°N 87.514460°W

Bird Creek is a stream in Hickman County, Tennessee, United States. It is a tributary of Piney River.

Bird Creek was named for William Bird, a pioneer who settled at the creek in 1807.

== See also ==
- List of rivers of Tennessee
