= Catheys Creek =

Body of water in Tennessee, United States of America

Coordinates: 35°39′34″N 87°15′26″W

Catheys Creek is a stream in the U.S. state of Tennessee, a tributary of the Duck River.

Catheys Creek has the name of the local Cathey family of pioneer settlers.

== See also ==
- List of rivers of Tennessee
