= Leipers Creek =

Stream in Tennessee

Coordinates: 35°41′19″N 87°12′09″W

Leipers Creek is a stream in the U.S. state of Tennessee, a tributary of the Duck River.

Leipers Creek has the name of Hugh Leiper, a 19th-century pioneer settler.

== See also ==
- List of rivers of Tennessee
