= Sweetwater Creek (Tennessee River tributary) =

Location
- Country: United States
- State: Tennessee

Physical characteristics
- Source: McMinn County, Tennessee
- Mouth: Watts Bar Lake near Loudon, Tennessee
  - coordinates: 35.748358°N 84.368956°W
- Length: 29.3 mi (47.2 km)
- Basin size: 60.69 mi^{2} (157.2 km^{2})

Sweetwater Creek is a tributary stream of the Tennessee River located in McMinn, Monroe, and Loudon counties in eastern Tennessee.

The stream rises in McMinn County and flows toward the northeast, paralleling the trend of the valleys and ridges, for 29.3 miles (47.2 km) through Monroe and Loudon counties, entering Watts Bar Reservoir in Loudon County at a location downstream from the city of Loudon and a short distance upstream from the I-75 bridge. It flows through the city of Sweetwater in Monroe County and provides most of that city's public water supply. The towns of Niota and Philadelphia are also located along Sweetwater Creek. Bacon Creek is a named tributary to Sweetwater Creek.

== Name ==
The name "Sweetwater" is thought to derive from the high quality of the water obtained from springs in the stream's valley. In the 1910s, local historian W.B. Lenoir concocted a different version of the name's origin. In a 1913 newspaper article and 1916 book, he reported that the name came from early white settlers' interpretation of "Soitee Woitee", the Cherokee name for the stream and its associated valley, which name he said meant "happy homes." He later admitted that this was a made-up story with no factual basis.

== Watershed characteristics and hydrology ==
The stream drains a watershed of 38,844 acres (60.69 square miles or 157 km^{2}). Much of the watershed is underlain by carbonate (dolomite and limestone) bedrock. Sinkholes and other topographic features characteristic of karst hydrology are present. As is typical of carbonate landscapes, there is significant interaction between groundwater and the stream. A large fraction of the stream's flow enters from groundwater, particularly during dry periods.

Streamflow was measured from 1964 through 1981 at two gauging stations located downstream from Sweetwater. The gauging site used from 1964 to April 1970 had a drainage area of 28.2 square miles (73 km^{2}) and the site used from May 1970 through 1981 had a drainage area of 26.4 square miles (68 km^{2}). Annual average flows measured at these sites ranged from 35 to 83 cubic feet per second (86 to 203 million litres per day). The lowest observed daily average flow was 4.3 cubic feet per second (11 million litres per day), in 1980, and the highest daily average was 887 cubic feet per second (2,170 million litres per day), in 1973. During the unusually dry weather conditions of 1980, three-quarters of the stream's flow is estimated to have been groundwater inflow.

== Uses and water quality ==
Sweetwater Creek provides the majority of the public water supply that is provided to the city of Sweetwater by the Sweetwater Utilities Board. Daily withdrawals averaged 810,000 gallons (3.1 million liters) as of 2000 and were expected to increase to more than 1.1 million gallons (4.2 million liters) by 2030. The city also receives an average of 540,000 gallons (2 million liters) per day of groundwater from a spring. Because the city's water requirements represent a large fraction of Sweetwater Creek streamflow during dry periods, there has been some concern that water supply may not be adequate to meet the city's future needs.

Most of the creek watershed is in forest (42%) and agricultural uses (40% pasture and hay land and 12% cropland). In 2002, there were 1,825 beef cows, 675 milk cows, 720 horses, 25 hogs, 30 sheep, and 110,500 poultry animals housed in the watershed. Residential and urban uses occupy about 6% of the watershed area. As of 1997, there were 3,640 people using septic systems in the watershed. Treated effluent from Sweetwater's sewage treatment plant is discharged to the stream. The stream is considered to have impaired water quality due to elevated levels of fecal coliform bacteria, nitrates, and sediment, which are attributed to factors including sewage effluent discharge, grazing and concentrated feeding of farm animals, land development, and channelization.

== See also ==
- List of rivers of Tennessee
