= Tennessee River =

River in the southeastern United States

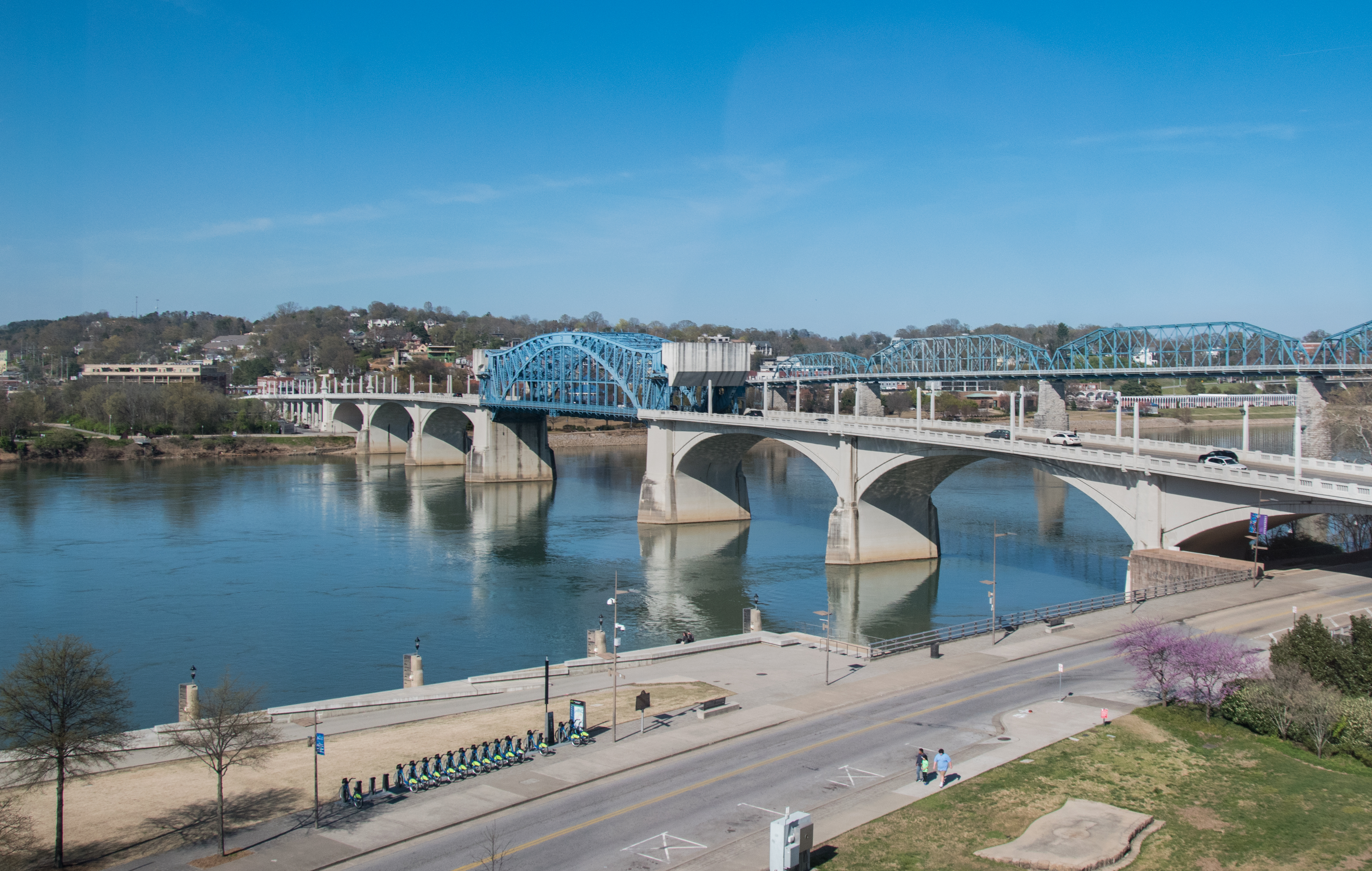
- The Tennessee River in downtown Chattanooga

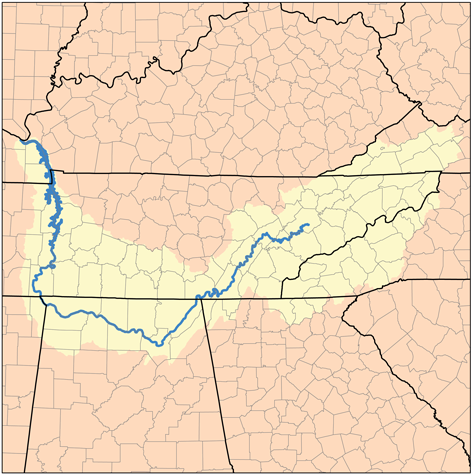
- Map of the Tennessee River watershed

Location
- Country: United States
- State: Tennessee, Alabama, Mississippi, Kentucky
- Cities: Knoxville, TN; Chattanooga, TN; Scottsboro, AL; Decatur, AL; Florence, AL; Savannah, TN

Physical characteristics
- Source: Confluence of French Broad and Holston rivers at Knoxville
  - coordinates: 35°57′33″N 83°51′01″W
  - elevation: 813 ft (248 m)
- Mouth: Ohio River at Livingston / McCracken counties, near Paducah, KY
  - coordinates: 37°04′02″N 88°33′53″W
  - elevation: 302 ft (92 m)
- Length: 652 mi (1,049 km)
- Basin size: 40,876 sq mi (105,870 km^{2})
- Discharge
  - average: 70,575 cu ft/s (1,998.5 m^{3}/s)
  - maximum: 500,000 cu ft/s (14,000 m^{3}/s)

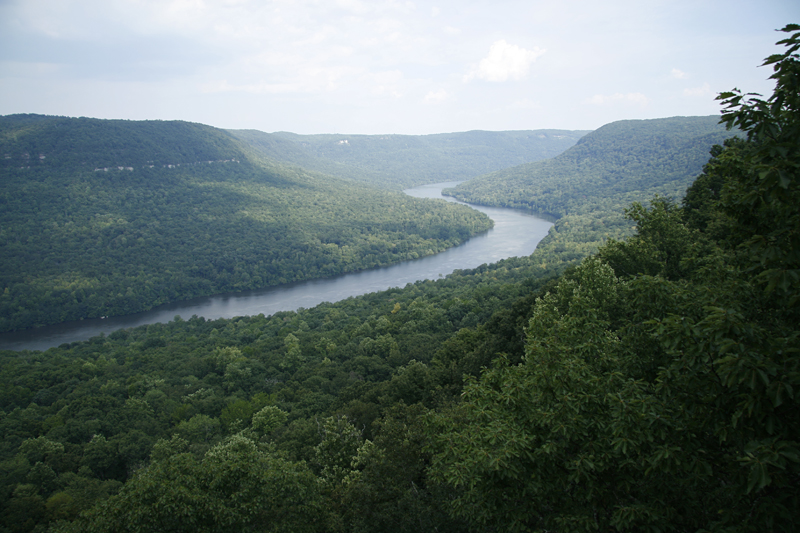
The Tennessee River flowing through the Tennessee River Gorge

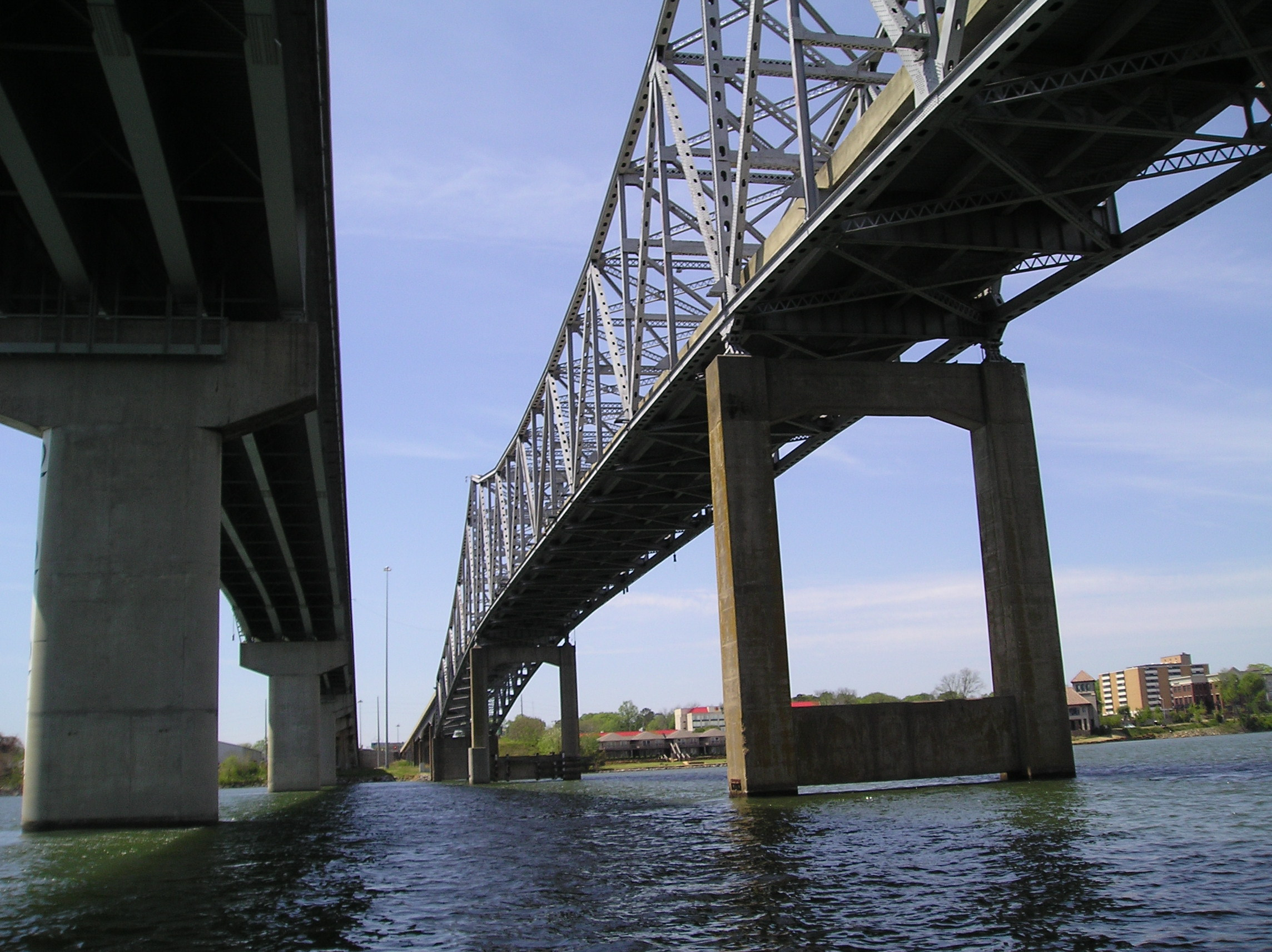
The "Steamboat Bill" Hudson Memorial Bridge in Decatur, Alabama

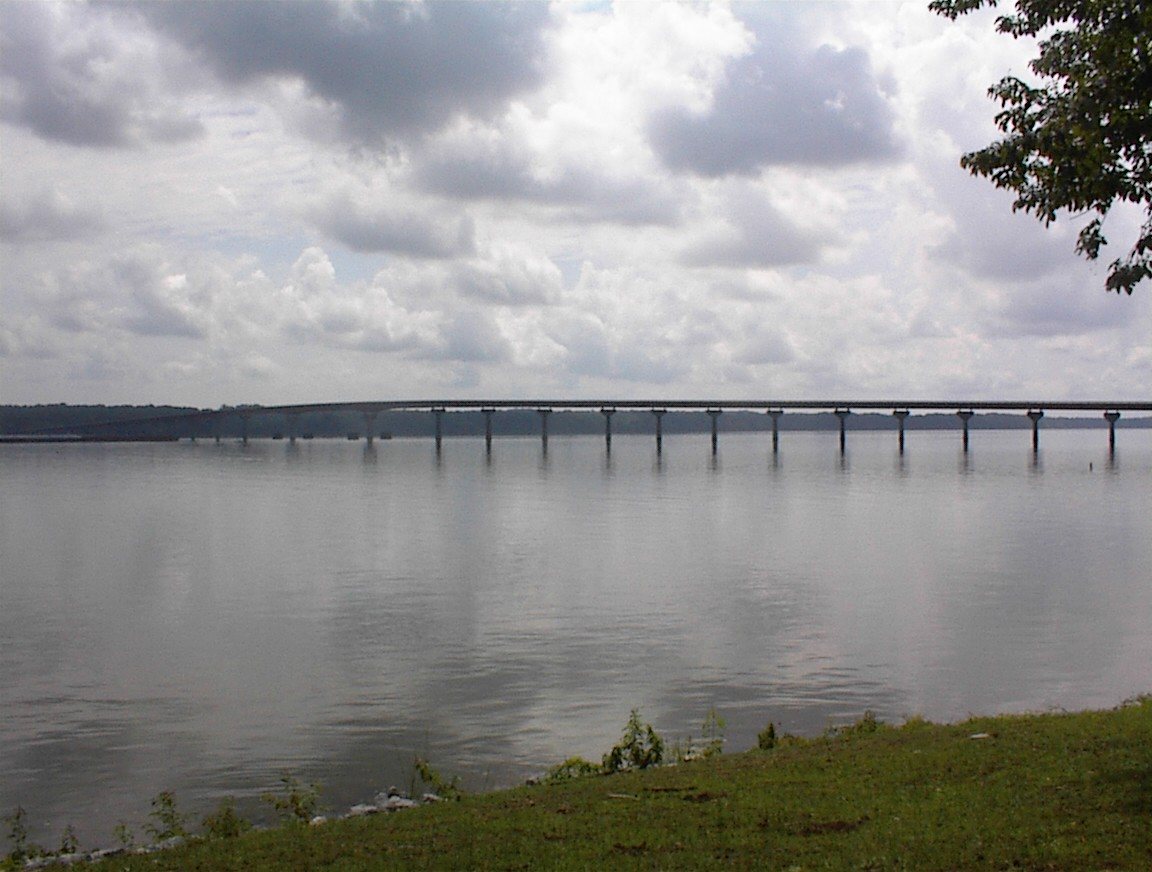
Natchez Trace Parkway, crossing the Tennessee River in Cherokee, Alabama

The Tennessee River is a 652-mile-long (1,049 km) river located in the southeastern United States. Flowing through the Tennessee Valley in the states of Tennessee, Alabama, Mississippi, and Kentucky, it begins at the confluence of French Broad and Holston rivers at Knoxville, and drains into the Ohio River near Paducah, Kentucky. It is the largest tributary of the Ohio, and drains a basin of 40,876 sq mi (105,870 km^{2}). It is also the lowest major tributary of the Ohio River, its mouth just 75 km (46.6 mi) upstream from the Ohio's confluence with the Mississippi River.

Its tributary, the Little Tennessee River, flows into it from Western North Carolina and northeastern Georgia.

== Etymology ==
The river appears on French maps from the late 17th century with the names "Caquinampo" or "Kasqui." Maps from the early 18th century call it "Cussate", "Hogohegee", "Callamaco", and "Acanseapi". A 1755 British map showed the Tennessee River as the "River of the Cherakees". By the late 18th century, it had come to be called "Tennessee", a name derived from the Cherokee village named Tanasi.

== Course ==
The Tennessee River is formed at the confluence of the Holston and French Broad rivers in present-day Knoxville, Tennessee. From Knoxville, it flows southwest through East Tennessee into Chattanooga, misses Georgia by about 250 feet (76 m), then crosses into Alabama. It travels through the Huntsville and Decatur area before reaching the Muscle Shoals area, and eventually forms a small part of the state's border with Mississippi, before returning to Tennessee. The Tennessee River's route northerly through Tennessee defines the boundary between two of Tennessee's Grand Divisions: Middle and West Tennessee.

The Tennessee–Tombigbee Waterway, a U.S. Army Corps of Engineers project providing a route to Alabama's Tombigbee River and a link to that state's Gulf of Mexico port of Mobile, enters the Tennessee River near the Tennessee-Alabama-Mississippi boundary. This waterway reduces the navigation distance from Tennessee, north Alabama, and northern Mississippi to the Gulf by hundreds of miles. The final part of the Tennessee's run is north through western Kentucky, where it separates the Jackson Purchase from the rest of the state. It flows into the Ohio River at Paducah, Kentucky.

== History ==
The river valley was once home to several Native American tribes. At Painted Bluff, in northeast Alabama, painted glyphs dating to ca. 1400 A.D. have been discovered among cliffs overlooking the river.

The first major battles of the American Civil War occurred along the river in 1862. The commander in the western theater, General Henry Halleck, considered the Tennessee River to be more significant than the Mississippi.

=== Starting point ===
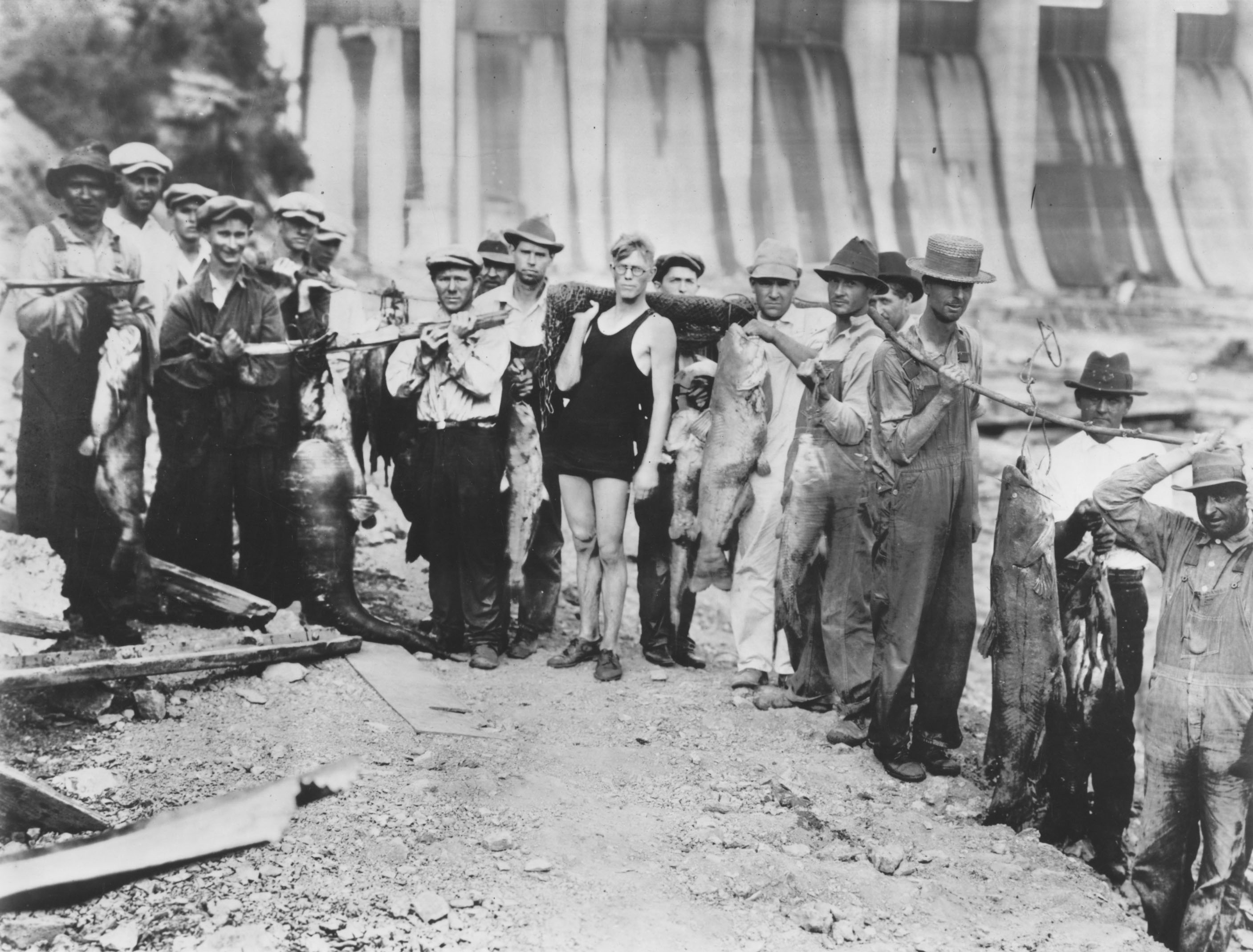
Fish catch near Wilson Dam on the Tennessee River around 1940.

The Tennessee River begins at mile post 652, where the French Broad River meets the Holston River, but historically there were several different definitions of its starting point. In the late 18th century, the mouth of the Little Tennessee River (at Lenoir City) was considered to be the beginning of the Tennessee River. Through much of the 19th century, the Tennessee River was considered to start at the mouth of Clinch River (at Kingston). An 1889 declaration by the Tennessee General Assembly designated Kingsport (on the Holston River) as the start of the Tennessee, but the following year a federal law was enacted that finally fixed the start of the river at its current location.

=== Water rights and border dispute between Georgia and Tennessee ===
At various points since the early 19th century, Georgia has disputed its northern border with Tennessee. In 1796, when Tennessee was admitted to the Union, the border was originally defined by United States Congress as located on the 35th parallel, thereby ensuring that at least a portion of the river would be located within Georgia. As a result of an erroneously conducted survey in 1818 (ratified by the Tennessee legislature, but not Georgia), however, the actual border line was set on the ground approximately one mile south, thus placing the disputed portion of the river entirely in Tennessee.

Georgia made unsuccessful attempts in the 1890s, 1905, 1915, 1922, 1941, 1947 and 1971 to resolve what it felt was an erroneous survey line.

In 2008, as a result of a serious drought and resulting water shortage, the Georgia General Assembly passed a resolution directing the governor to pursue its claim in the United States Supreme Court.

According to a story aired on WTVC-TV in Chattanooga on March 14, 2008, a local attorney familiar with case law on border disputes, said the U.S. Supreme Court generally will maintain the original borders between states and avoid stepping into border disputes, preferring the parties work out their differences.

The Chattanooga Times Free Press reported on March 25, 2013, that Georgia senators approved House Resolution 4 stating that if Tennessee declines to settle with them, the dispute will be given to the state attorney general, to take Tennessee before the Supreme Court to settle the issue once and for all. The Atlantic Wire, in commenting on Georgia's actions, stated:

The Great Georgia–Tennessee Border War of 2013 Is Upon Us. Historians, take note: On this day, which is not a day in 1732, a boundary dispute between two Southern states took a turn for the wet. In a two-page resolution passed overwhelmingly by the state senate, Georgia declared that it, not its neighbor to the north, controls part of the Tennessee River at Nickajack. Georgia doesn't want Nickajack. It wants that water.

== Modern use ==
The Tennessee River is an important part of the Great Loop, the recreational circumnavigation of Eastern North America by water. The main channel is accessible to recreational watercraft at over 200 public access points along the river's course.

The Tennessee River has historically been a major highway for riverboats through the South, and today they are frequently used along the river. Major ports include Guntersville, Chattanooga, Decatur, Yellow Creek, and Muscle Shoals. This river has contributed greatly to the economic and industrial development of the Tennessee Valley as a whole. The economies of cities such as Decatur and Chattanooga would not be as dynamic as they are today, were it not for the Tennessee River. Many companies still rely on the river as a means of transportation for their materials. In Chattanooga, for example, steel is exported on boats, as it is much more efficient than moving it on land.

In addition, locks along the Tennessee River waterway provide passage between reservoirs for more than 13,000 recreational craft each year. The Chickamauga Dam, located just upstream from Chattanooga, was projected in 2014 to have a new lock built, but it has been delayed due to a lack of funding.

In 2022, the Tennessee Volunteers football team defeated Alabama 52–49, their first win in the series since 2006. Afterward, fans stormed the field and tore down the goalposts, throwing them in the Tennessee River after parading them through the city.

== Dams ==
The river has been dammed nine times since the 1930s by Tennessee Valley Authority (TVA) projects. The construction of TVA's Kentucky Dam on the Tennessee River and the Corps of Engineers' Barkley Dam on the Cumberland River led to the development of associated lakes, and the creation of an area called the Land Between the Lakes. A navigation canal located at Grand Rivers, Kentucky, links Kentucky Lake and Lake Barkley. The canal allows for a shorter trip for river traffic going from the Tennessee to most of the Ohio River, and for traffic going down the Cumberland River toward Tennessee.

== Ecology ==
The Tennessee River and its tributaries host some 102 species of mussel. It also is home to the rare freshwater snail Athearnia anthonyi. Native Americans ate freshwater mussels. Potters of the Mississippian culture used crushed mussel shell mixed into clay to make their pottery stronger.

A "pearl" button industry was established in the Tennessee Valley beginning in 1887, producing buttons from the abundant mussel shells. Button production ceased after World War II when plastics replaced mother-of-pearl as a button material. Mussel populations have declined drastically due to dam construction, water pollution, and invasive species.

== Tennessee River tributaries ==
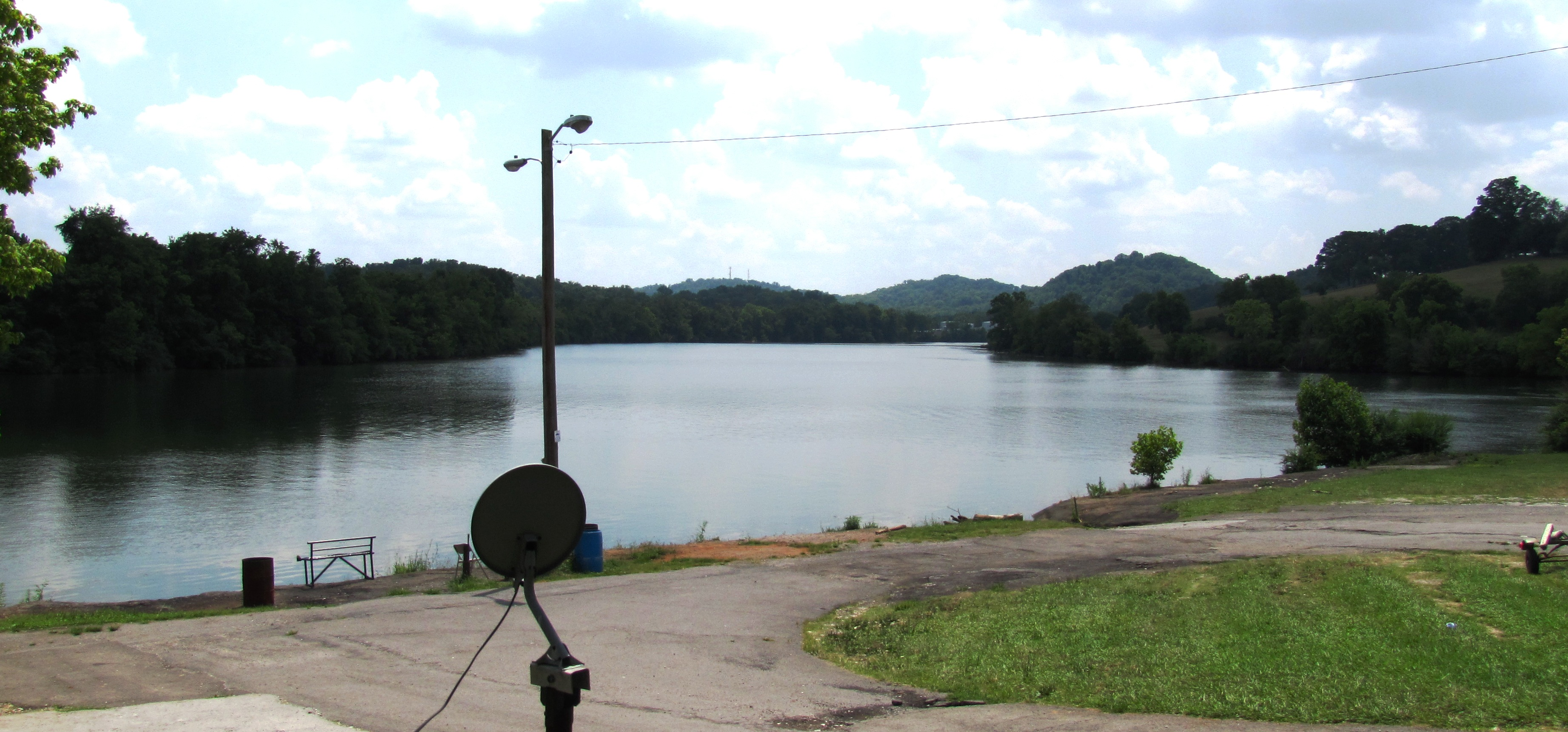
Forks-of-the-River in East Knoxville: the French Broad (left) joins the Holston (right) to form the Tennessee (center)

Tributaries and sub-tributaries start with headwaters and are listed in descending order toward their confluence with the Tennessee River:

- Horse Creek (Tennessee)
- Big Sandy River (Tennessee)
- White Oak Creek
- Duck River (Tennessee)
  - Buffalo River (Tennessee)
    - Green River
    - Little Buffalo River
  - Piney River (Tennessee)
  - Little Duck River
- Beech River (Tennessee)
- Bear Creek (Alabama, Mississippi)
- Buzzard Roost Creek (Alabama)
- Colbert Creek (Alabama)
- Cotaco Creek (Alabama)
- Malone Creek (Alabama)
- Mulberry Creek (Alabama)
- Cane Creek (Alabama)
- Dry Creek (Alabama)
- Little Bear Creek (Alabama)
- Spring Creek (Alabama)
- Cypress Creek (Alabama)
- Shoal Creek (Alabama)
- First Creek (Alabama)
- Elk River (Tennessee, Alabama)
- Flint Creek (Alabama)
- Limestone Creek (Alabama, Tennessee)
  - Beaverdam Creek (Alabama)
- Indian Creek (Alabama)
- Barren Fork Creek (Alabama)
  - Bradford Creek, briefly merged with Barren Fork Creek (Alabama)
- Flint River (Alabama, Tennessee)
- Paint Rock River (Alabama, Tennessee)
- Sequatchie River (Tennessee)
  - Little Sequatchie River
- Mountain Creek (Tennessee)
- Lookout Creek (Tennessee, Georgia)
- Chattanooga Creek (Tennessee, Georgia)
- Citico Creek (Tennessee)
- South Chickamauga Creek (Tennessee, Georgia)
- North Chickamauga Creek (Tennessee)
- Hiwassee River (Tennessee, North Carolina)
  - Conasauga Creek (Tennessee)
  - Ocoee River (Tennessee, Georgia)
  - Nottely River (North Carolina, Georgia)
- Piney River (Tennessee)
- Clinch River (Tennessee, Virginia)
  - Emory River (Tennessee)
    - Little Emory River
    - Obed River (Tennessee)
      - Little Obed River
  - Poplar Creek
    - East Fork Poplar Creek
  - Beaver Creek
  - Powell River (Tennessee, Virginia)
- Little Tennessee River (Tennessee, North Carolina)
  - Tellico River (Tennessee)
  - Tuckasegee River (North Carolina)
  - Nantahala River (North Carolina)
  - Cullasaja River (North Carolina)
- Little River (Tennessee)
- French Broad River
  - Little Pigeon River (Tennessee)
  - Nolichucky River (Tennessee, North Carolina)
  - Pigeon River (Tennessee, North Carolina)
  - Swannanoa River (North Carolina)
- Holston River (Tennessee)
  - North Fork Holston River (Tennessee, Virginia)
  - South Fork Holston River (Tennessee, Virginia)
    - Watauga River (Tennessee, North Carolina)
      - Doe River (Tennessee)
  - Middle Fork Holston River (Virginia)

== See also ==
- List of Alabama rivers
- List of crossings of the Tennessee River
- List of dams and reservoirs of the Tennessee River
- List of Kentucky rivers
- List of longest rivers of the United States (by main stem)
- List of Mississippi rivers
- List of Tennessee rivers
- Tennessee River 600
- Tennessee River Valley
- Tennessee-Tombigbee Waterway
