= Piney River (East Tennessee) =

Coordinates: 35.65396°N 84.78300°W

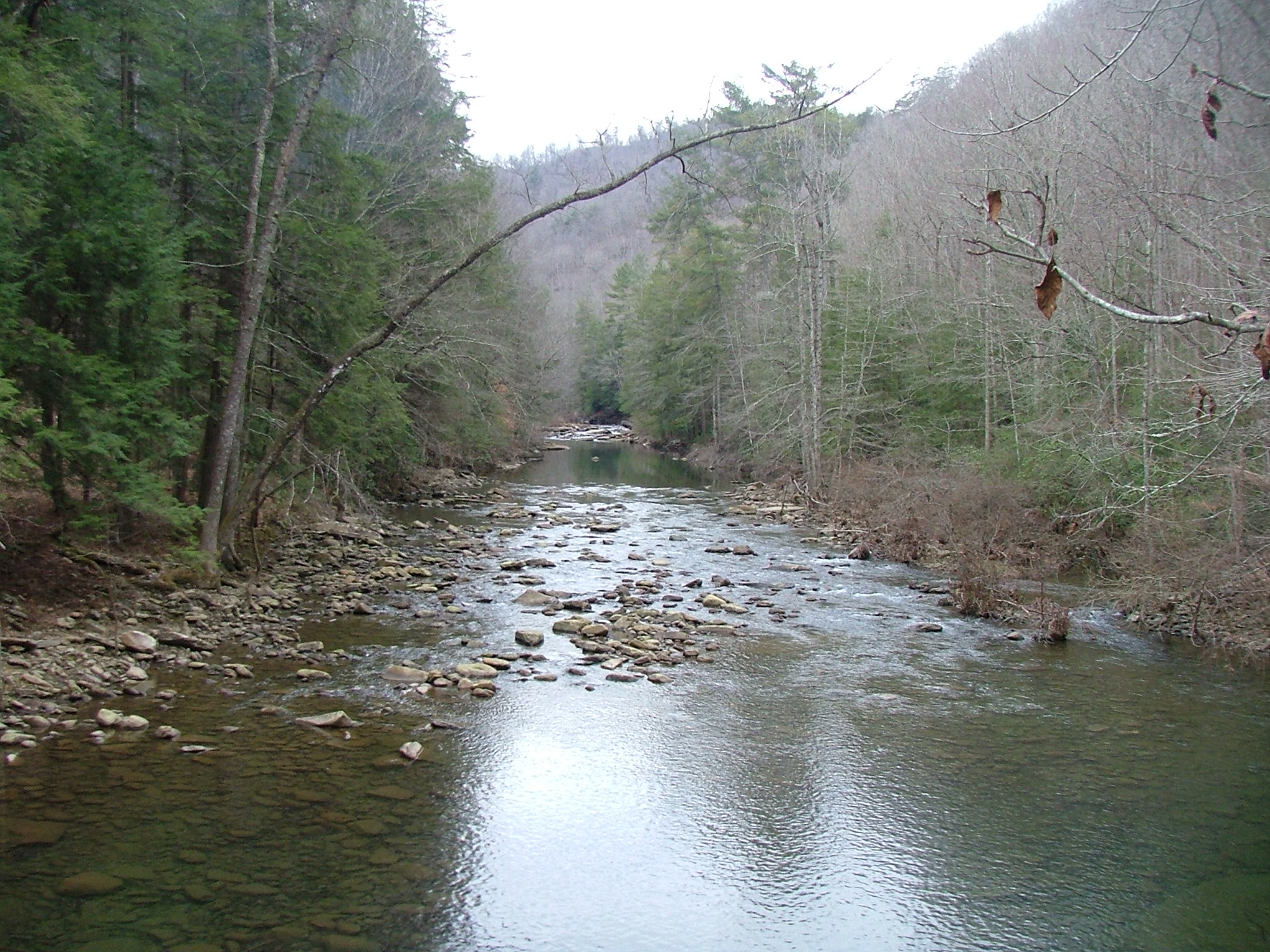
- Upstream view from the Cumberland Trail bridge

Physical characteristics
- Source
  - location: Confluence of Piney and Duskin Creeks
  - elevation: ~ 1,020 ft (310 m)
- Mouth
  - location: Watts Bar Lake
  - elevation: 741 ft (226 m)

The Piney River is a stream that drains a portion of the U.S. state of Tennessee's Cumberland Plateau generally known as Walden Ridge. The Piney River rises near the Rhea County – Bledsoe County line and is referred to as Piney Creek in its upper reaches roughly until its confluence with Duskin Creek. Its major tributary, Little Piney Creek, flows over two spectacular waterfalls which are located in Piney Falls State Natural Area near the community of Grandview. A tributary of Little Piney Creek is Soak Creek, Tennessee's newest State Scenic River.

The confluence of the two streams occurs below the falls of the smaller stream in an area referred to as "Shut-in Gap". The stream flows out of the gap and is bridged by State Route 68 just before that road begins its steep climb up the Cumberland Escarpment onto Waldens Ridge. The stream flows north of Spring City, Tennessee and becomes slack just east of the town at a headland of Watts Bar Lake, an impoundment of the Tennessee River formed by the Tennessee Valley Authority's Watts Bar Dam project. The mouth of the Piney is one of the larger bays of Watts Bar Lake and contains several small islands.

The Cumberland Trail follows the Piney River.

== Variant names ==
According to the Geographic Names Information System, Piney River has also been known historically as:

- Piney Creek
- Pine River

== See also ==
- List of rivers of Tennessee
