= Little Buffalo River (Tennessee) =

Physical characteristics
- Source
  - location: northern Lawrence County, near Laurel Hill.
  - coordinates: 35.2973°N 87.4739°W
  - elevation: 980 ft (300 m)
- Mouth
  - location: confluence with the Buffalo River near State Route 99 in Lewis County
  - coordinates: 35.4504°N 87.5314°W
  - elevation: 673 ft (205 m)
- Length: 18.1 mi (29.1 km)

Basin features
- Progression: Lawrence County; Lewis County
- River system: Tennessee River Basin

The Little Buffalo River is an 18.1-mile-long (29.1 km) tributary of the Buffalo River in the U.S. state of Tennessee. Via the Buffalo, Duck, Tennessee, and Ohio rivers, it reaches the Mississippi River.

It rises a short distance south of Deerfield in northern Lawrence County, Tennessee, near Laurel Hill. Its major tributaries are Jacks Branch, which follows the Natchez Trace Parkway for approximately a mile and is the site of picnic areas, trails, and rest rooms, and Chief Creek, which is also crossed by the Natchez Trace Parkway, as is the Little Buffalo itself. The Little Buffalo empties into the Buffalo River near State Route 99 in Lewis County.

The Hydrologic Unit Code (HUC-12) for the Little Buffalo is 060400040106. The Little Buffalo is a part of the Upper Buffalo River watershed which is HUC-10 0604000401.

== See also ==
- List of rivers of Tennessee
