= Ugly Creek =

Ugly Creek may refer to:

- Ugly Creek (Georgia)
- Ugly Creek (Tennessee)
- Big Ugly Creek, a stream in West Virginia
