= Green River (Tennessee) =

River in Tennessee, United States

Physical characteristics
- Source
  - location: About 7 miles (11 km) southeast of Waynesboro, Tennessee
- Mouth
  - location: Confluence with the Buffalo River (Tennessee)
  - coordinates: 35.4538°N 87.7725°W
  - elevation: 568 ft (173 m)
- Length: 21.1 mi (34.0 km)

Basin features
- River system: Tennessee River

The Green River is a 21.1-mile-long (34.0 km) tributary of the Buffalo River in Tennessee. By the Buffalo River and the Duck River it is a tributary of the Tennessee River. The Green River is one of the main streams of Wayne County. Situated in the southwestern corner of Middle Tennessee along the Alabama line, Wayne County is one of the state's largest counties in area but is very sparsely populated. Most of the county is located on the Southern Highland Rim, an area of hills, ridges, and narrow stream valleys that is largely underlain by Paleozoic limestone.

The Green River rises about 7 miles (11 km) southeast of the Wayne County seat of Waynesboro and flows northwest into that town, which is almost bisected by it, and then flows generally almost due north, albeit by a fairly meandering course, to its confluence with the Buffalo River just south of the Wayne County - Perry County line. It is the source of the Waynesboro municipal water supply. The river lives up to its name, often showing a deep bluish-green color, especially in its downstream reaches.

This Green River should not be confused with the Green River in Kentucky, which is a tributary of the Ohio River and has a very small portion of its drainage basin in north-central Tennessee.

== See also ==
- List of rivers of Tennessee
