= Sevenmile Creek (Tennessee) =

Coordinates: 36.0247222°N 86.7486111°W

Location
- Country: United States
- State: Tennessee

Physical characteristics
- Source
  - location: a pond near the intersection of Cloverland Drive and Edmonson Pike near Sterling Oaks
- Mouth
  - location: Mill Creek
  - elevation: 476 ft (145 m)
- Length: 6.6 mi (10.6 km)

Sevenmile Creek is a 6.6-mile-long (10.6 km) creek in Nashville, Tennessee. It begins at a pond near the intersection of Cloverland Drive and Edmonson Pike near Sterling Oaks in Nashville, Tennessee and is a tributary of Mill Creek. Via Mill Creek, the Cumberland River, and the Ohio River, it is part of the Mississippi River watershed.

== See also ==
- List of rivers of Tennessee
