= Little Emory River =

Coordinates: 35.93980°N 84.48243°W

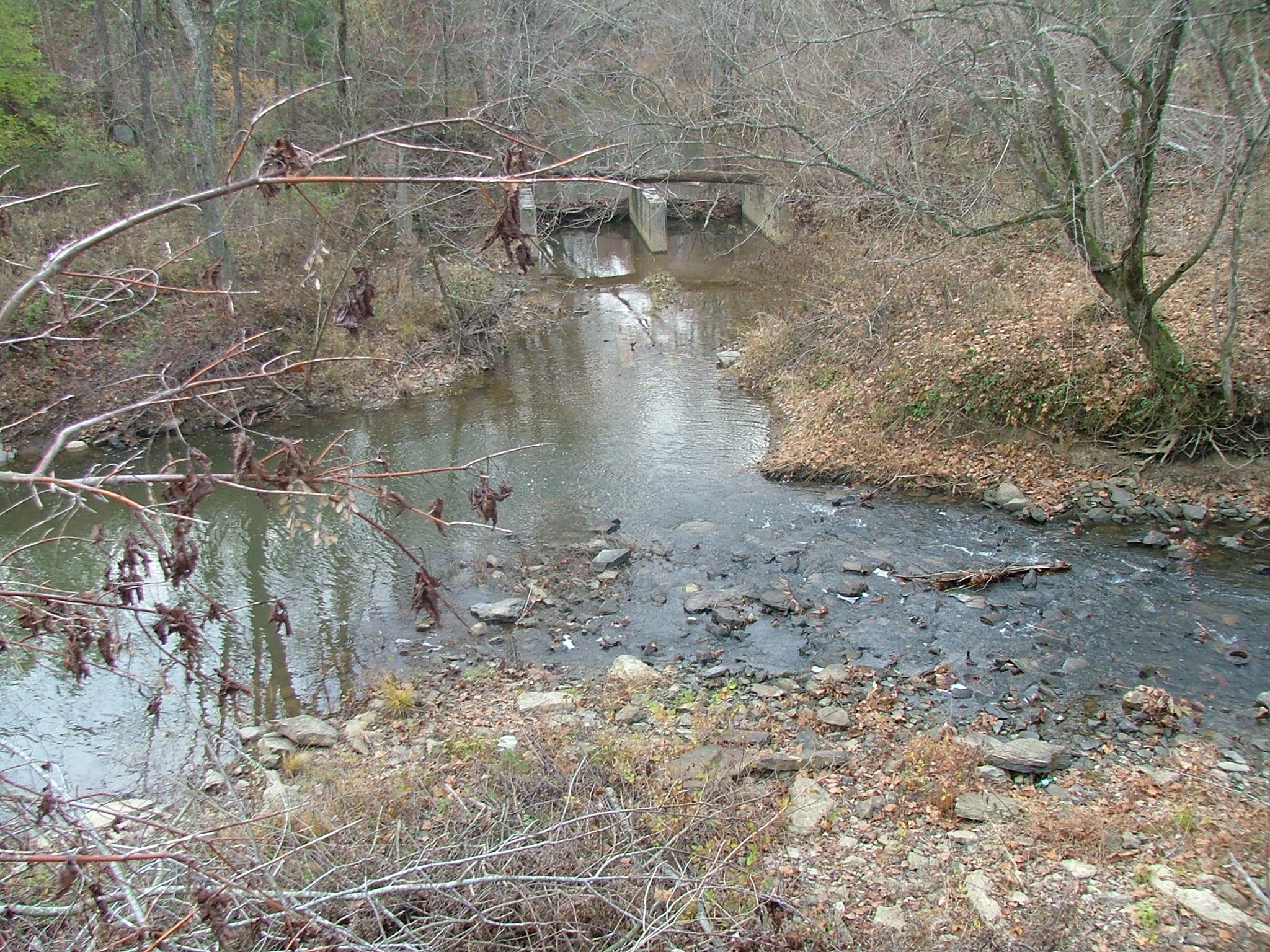
- Confluence of Little Emory River and Bitter Creek near US 27

Physical characteristics
- Source
  - location: Morgan County, Tennessee near the town of Coalfield
- Mouth
  - location: Emory River in Roane County
  - elevation: 741 ft (226 m)

The Little Emory River rises in Morgan County, Tennessee near the town of Coalfield. It is one of the major tributaries to the Emory River. It crosses into Roane County, where it soon becomes an embayment of Watts Bar Lake several miles upstream of its mouth into the Emory. (Watts Bar Lake is a relatively deep reservoir and causes "slack water" conditions many miles up several Tennessee River tributaries, not just the main stream.)

== See also ==
- List of rivers of Tennessee
