= Big Swan Creek =

Stream in Tennessee, U.S.

Coordinates: 35.770068°N 87.411124°W

Big Swan Creek is a stream in Hickman, Lewis and Lawrence counties, in the U.S. state of Tennessee. Variant names are Swan Creek and West Fork Swan Creek. Big Swan Creek is a tributary of the Duck River.

The creek was named from an incident when hunters killed a swan at the creek before 1800.

Its tributaries include Blue Buck Creek and Copperas Branch.

== See also ==
- List of rivers of Tennessee
