= Cave Branch =

Stream in Hickman County, Tennessee, U.S.

Coordinates: 35.676735°N 87.710022°W

Cave Branch is a stream in Hickman County, Tennessee, in the United States. It is a tributary to Cane Creek and part of the Buffalo River watershed.

A large cave near the mouth of Cave Branch caused its name to be selected.

== See also ==
- List of rivers of Tennessee
