= Ugly Creek (Tennessee) =

Stream in Hickman County, Tennessee, U.S.

Coordinates: 35.7225692°N 87.3966797°W

Ugly Creek is a stream in Hickman County, Tennessee, in the United States. It is the largest tributary to Blue Buck Creek.

== History ==
The origin of the name Ugly Creek is obscure.

== See also ==
- List of rivers of Tennessee
