= Buck Branch (Duck River tributary) =

Stream in Hickman County, Tennessee, U.S.

Coordinates: 35.7453466°N 87.2980664°W

Buck Branch is a stream in Hickman County, Tennessee, in the United States. It is a tributary of Duck River.

== History ==
Buck Branch was named from the fact many bucks were shot there by early hunters.

== See also ==
- List of rivers of Tennessee
