= Plunder (disambiguation) =

To plunder is to indiscriminately take goods by force, notably:

- Nazi plunder, art theft and other items stolen during World War II as part of the organized looting of German-occupied European countries on behalf of Germany′s ruling Nazi Party

Plunder may also refer to:

== Art and entertainment ==
- Plunder (1931 film), a British comedy film, based on the stage play
- Plunder (play), a 1928 stage farce by Ben Travers
- Plunder (RuneQuest), a 1980 fantasy role-playing game
- Plunder (serial), a 1923 film serial
- Plunder, a 1948 novel by Samuel Hopkins Adams
- Looten Plunder, a villain in the television program Captain Planet and the Planeteers

== Other uses ==
- Plunder (comics), a villain in DC Comics
- Operation Plunder, a World War II operation
- Stevie Plunder (1963–1996), guitarist, singer, and songwriter
- Plundering Time (1644–1646), also known as "Claiborne and Ingle's Rebellion"
- Plunders Creek, a stream in Tennessee, U.S.
- A former slang term for baggage
- A former term for household goods
- A former term for personal property
- A Philippine English term for the most flagrant act of corruption in the Philippines

== See also ==
- Plunderer (disambiguation)
