= Panther Branch (Duck River tributary) =

Stream in Hickman County, Tennessee, U.S.

Coordinates: 35.8220105°N 87.5816844°W

Panther Branch is a stream in Hickman County, Tennessee, in the United States. It is a tributary of the Duck River.

Panther Creek was so named on account of numerous panthers who preyed on area livestock and wildlife.

== See also ==
- List of rivers of Tennessee
