= Defeated Creek (Hickman County, Tennessee) =

Stream in Tennessee, U.S.

Coordinates: 35.783956°N 87.459459°W

Defeated Creek is a stream in Hickman County, Tennessee, in the United States. It is a tributary to Duck River.

Hickman County namesake Edwin Hickman was killed by Indians at Defeated Creek.

== See also ==
- List of rivers of Tennessee
