= The Ugly =

The Ugly may refer to:

- The Ugly (1997 film), a New Zealand horror film by Scott Reynolds
- The Ugly (2025 film), a South Korean mystery thriller film by Yeon Sang-ho

== See also ==
- Ugly (disambiguation)
