= Plunderer =

Plunderer or The Plunderer may refer to:

- Plunderer (comics), a character appearing in Marvel Comics publications
- Plunderer (manga), a Japanese manga series
- The Plunderer (1915 film), an American film
- The Plunderer (1924 film), an American film

== See also ==
- Plunder (disambiguation)
- Penny Plunderer, comics
- The Plunderers (disambiguation)
