= Overall Creek =

Stream in Tennessee, U.S.

Coordinates: 35°55′24″N 86°27′15″W

Overall Creek (sometimes called Overalls Creek) is a stream in the U.S. state of Tennessee, a tributary of the West Fork of the Stones River. It has a school named after it called Overall creek elementary

Overall Creek has the name of Robert Overall, a pioneer settler.

== See also ==
- List of rivers of Tennessee
