= Blue Buck Creek =

River in Tennessee, United States

Coordinates: 35°43′52″N 87°24′54″W

Blue Buck Creek is a stream off of Big Swan Creek in Hickman County, Tennessee, in the United States. It is a tributary to Big Swan Creek.

== History ==
Blue Buck Creek was named from a pioneer incident when a hunter killed a buck with blueish fur.

== See also ==
- List of rivers of Tennessee
