= Big Sandy River (Tennessee) =

Coordinates: 36°24′35″N 88°4′16″W

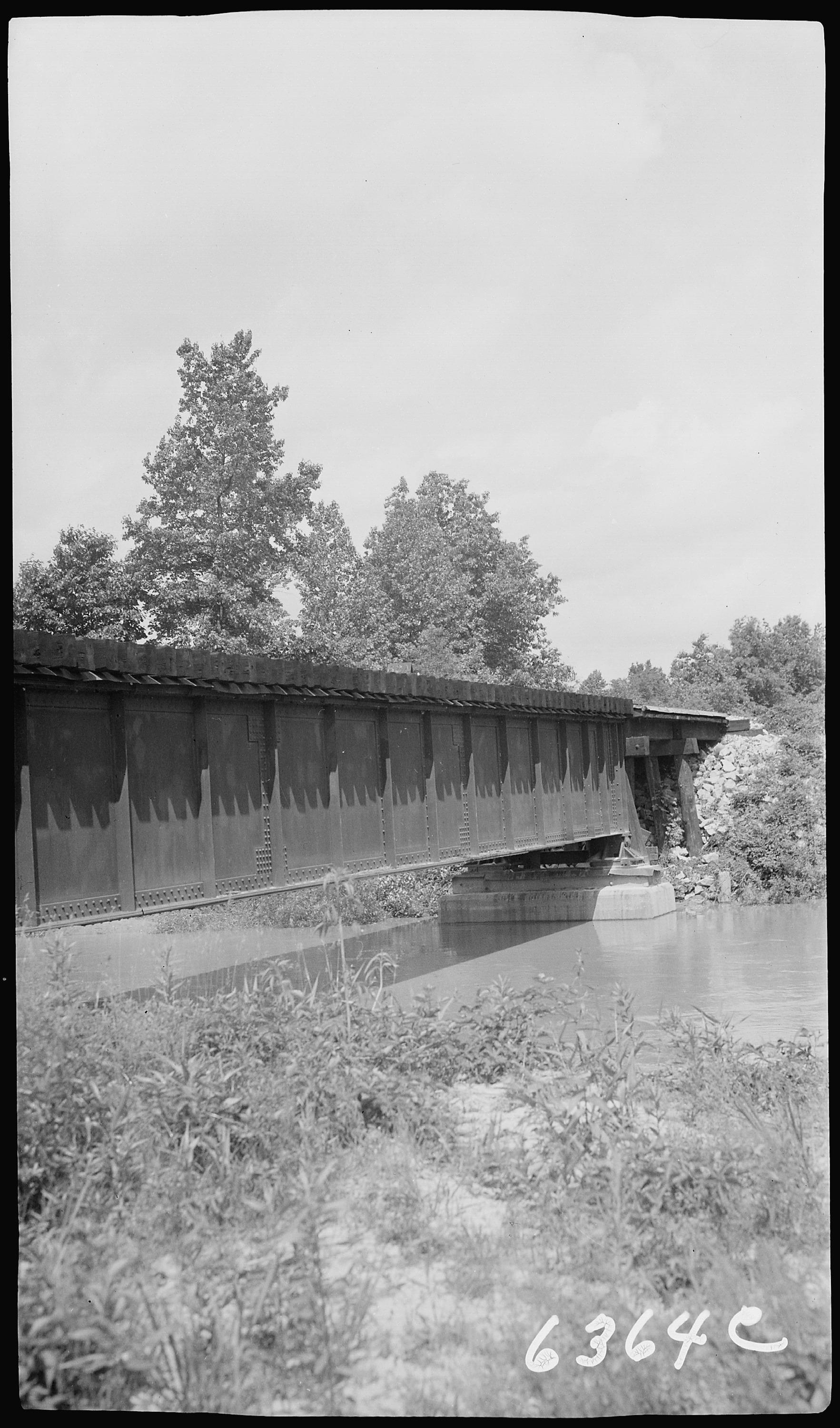
- A Louisville and Nashville Railroad bridge crosses the Big Sandy River.

Location
- Country: United States
- Location: Tennessee

Physical characteristics
- Source
  - location: northwest of Lexington, Tennessee
  - elevation: 351 ft (107 m)
- Mouth
  - location: Tennessee River
- Length: 60 mi (97 km)

The Big Sandy River is a 60-mile-long (97 km) tributary of the Tennessee River in the U.S. state of Tennessee. Via the Tennessee and Ohio rivers, it is part of the Mississippi River watershed. The Big Sandy rises about 5 miles (8 km) northwest of Lexington, in the same vicinity as two other important rivers of West Tennessee, the Beech River and the Middle Fork of the Forked Deer River.

From near its source downstream, much of the Big Sandy River has been channelized. It crosses into Carroll County near the community of Yuma. In Carroll County, it passes slightly east of the town of Bruceton. Turning somewhat northeast, it crosses into Benton County. The former channel (prior to channelization) of the Big Sandy forms several miles of the boundary between Benton County and Henry County. The lower Big Sandy is impounded by the Kentucky Dam project of the Tennessee Valley Authority (TVA); it forms the biggest single embayment on Kentucky Lake.

The head of the embayment is the site of the town of Big Sandy and nearby is a major "dewatering area". This is an almost flat area (superficially resembling a tidal flat) which is flooded or not, depending on TVA's assessment of a proper level for Kentucky Lake, taking into consideration flood control, navigation, electrical power needs, and recreation (in that order, according to the 1933 act establishing the Authority). Another, even larger, dewatering area is maintained by the help of an auxiliary dam on a tributary, West Sandy Creek.

Despite the extensive channelization activity, much of what the river must have been prior to this can be seen in the wetlands surrounding it near the Interstate 40 bridge and also along State Route 69 between Camden and Paris.

== Mercury contamination ==
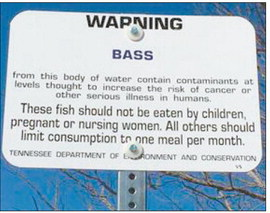
TWRA Contaminant Advisory

The Tennessee Department of Environment and Conservation (TDEC) has been collecting data on possible contaminates in the numerous fish species in the Big Sandy River and embayment. These studies started in 2009 and continued through 2014. After which an advisory was issued including all of the Big Sandy and its embayment on the Tennessee River. The advisory states that Largemouth bass and spotted bass can have mercury contamination, and that children, expecting mothers, and mothers who are breastfeeding should not consume them at all. The advisory goes on to state that all others should limit their consumption to these bass species to once per month. Mercury can have serious effects on the development of children.

Mercury contamination is contained in the muscular tissue of the fish, instead of the fat tissue like other contaminants. These larger predatory fish like the Largemouth and spotted bass become more contaminated, by biomagnification, as the mercury moves up the food chain. Producer organisms become contaminated, then the fish that eat them can become 10 times as contaminated as the level of the food chain below them, this contamination increases in strength as it moves up the food chain to these top predators in the environment. The contamination levels in other fish like the crappie, blue gill, shellcrackers, and catfish were all listed as safe to consume.

After the advisory was posted about the bass contamination, several members of the public expressed concerns to the TDEC at a public meeting, about possible contamination in the backwater area of the West Sandy Creek at Springville, TN. After the tested was completed an advisory was issued that Bass and Crappie in the backwater area, locally known as the Springville Bottom, had high levels of mercury contamination. The advisory follows:

Children and nursing or pregnant mothers should avoid eating crappie or bass from Springville Bottom in any amount, and everyone else should limit consumption to one meal per month. Catch and release fishing, boating, swimming, or drinking treated water in this area poses no additional risk.” -TDEC Deputy Commissioner Shari Meghreblian

== See also ==
- List of rivers of Tennessee
