= Wartrace Creek (Duck River tributary) =

River in Tennessee, United States

Coordinates: 35°30′23″N 86°20′03″W

Wartrace Creek is a tributary of the Duck River, located within Bedford County, Tennessee, United States. It is the northernmost of the "three forks" of the Duck River, the others being Garrison in the middle, and Barren on the south. These creeks drained what was the site of Fort Nash in the 1790s. Approximately 85,000 acres of land on Wartrace Creek was granted to Thomas Blount and John Gray Blount, kin to Governor William Blount, in 1793.

The creek is said to be named for a "war trace" or "war trail" that was used as "the most direct and feasible route, in the primeval days, in a general southeastern course for the Indian villages at 'Nicajack Cave'," passing by the prehistoric Old Stone Fort along the way.

== See also ==
- Wartrace Historic District
