= Plunkett Creek (Tennessee) =

Location
- Country: United States
- State: Tennessee

Physical characteristics
- Source: Smith County
  - coordinates: 36.2058878°N 86.0594335°W
- Mouth: Cumberland River
  - coordinates: 36.2717196°N 86.0610999°W

Plunkett Creek is a 6.6-mile-long (10.6 km) tributary of the Cumberland River in South Carthage Township, Smith County, Tennessee, in the United States. Plunkett Creek flows generally north. Interstate 40 crosses it just before its confluence with the Cumberland River at Beasley's Bend, just east of the unincorporated community of Rome. Its major tributary is Rawls Creek.

The creek has also been known as Plunketts Creek, according to the USGS Geographic Names Information System database.

== See also ==
- List of rivers of Tennessee
