= Louse Creek (Tennessee) =

Stream in Tennessee, United States

Coordinates: 35.2284144°N 86.4086034°W

Louse Creek is a stream in Lincoln County, Tennessee, in the United States. It is a tributary to East Fork Mulberry Creek.

Accounts on why the creek was so named differ. Some believe a War of 1812 officer said the creek's muddy waters were "lousy" for his horses to drink, while others attribute it to a local child's case of head lice.

== See also ==
- List of rivers of Tennessee
