= The Plunderers =

The Plunderers may refer to:

- The Plunderers (1948 film), an American film
- The Plunderers (1960 film), an American film
- The Plunderers (band), an Australian band
- The Plunderers (novel), a 1970 novel by Norman A. Daniels

== See also ==
- Plunderer (disambiguation)
