= White Oak Creek (Tennessee) =

Coordinates: 36.1481144°N 87.5522379°W

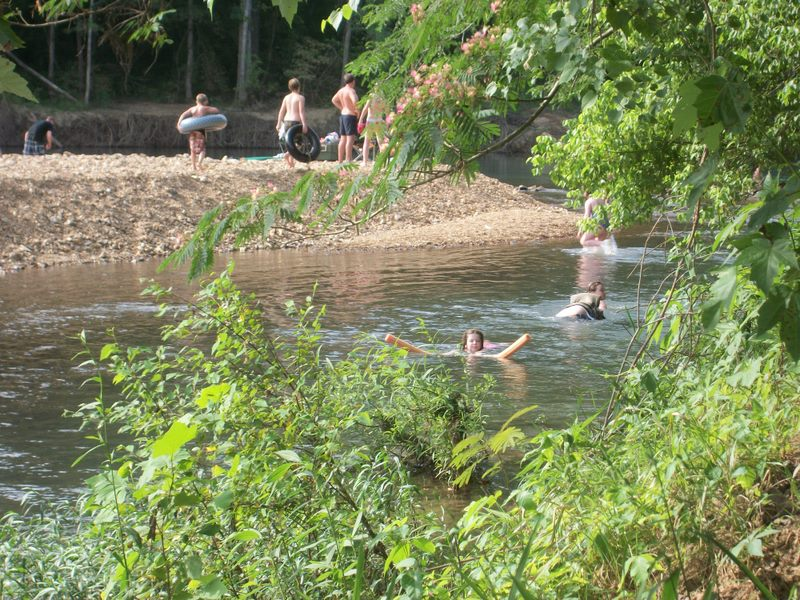
- White Oak Creek in Houston County, Tennessee

Location
- Country: United States
- State: Tennessee

Physical characteristics
- Mouth
  - location: Tennessee River
  - elevation: 358 ft (109 m)
- Length: 30.5 mi (49.1 km)

Basin features
- Tributaries
  - left: Miles Creek

White Oak Creek (shown on federal maps as Whiteoak Creek) is a 30.5-mile-long (49.1 km) tributary of the Tennessee River in Middle Tennessee in the United States. The area of the creek around the span of the Magnolia Bridge is a popular public park.

== See also ==
- List of rivers of Tennessee
