= Copperas Branch =

Stream in Hickman County, Tennessee, U.S.

Coordinates: 35.673959°N 87.433625°W

Copperas Branch is a stream in Hickman County, Tennessee, in the United States. It is a tributary to Big Swan Creek.

== History ==
Copperas Branch was named for the nearby mining of copperas by early settlers.

== See also ==
- List of rivers of Tennessee
