= Sequatchie, Tennessee =

- Unincorporated community
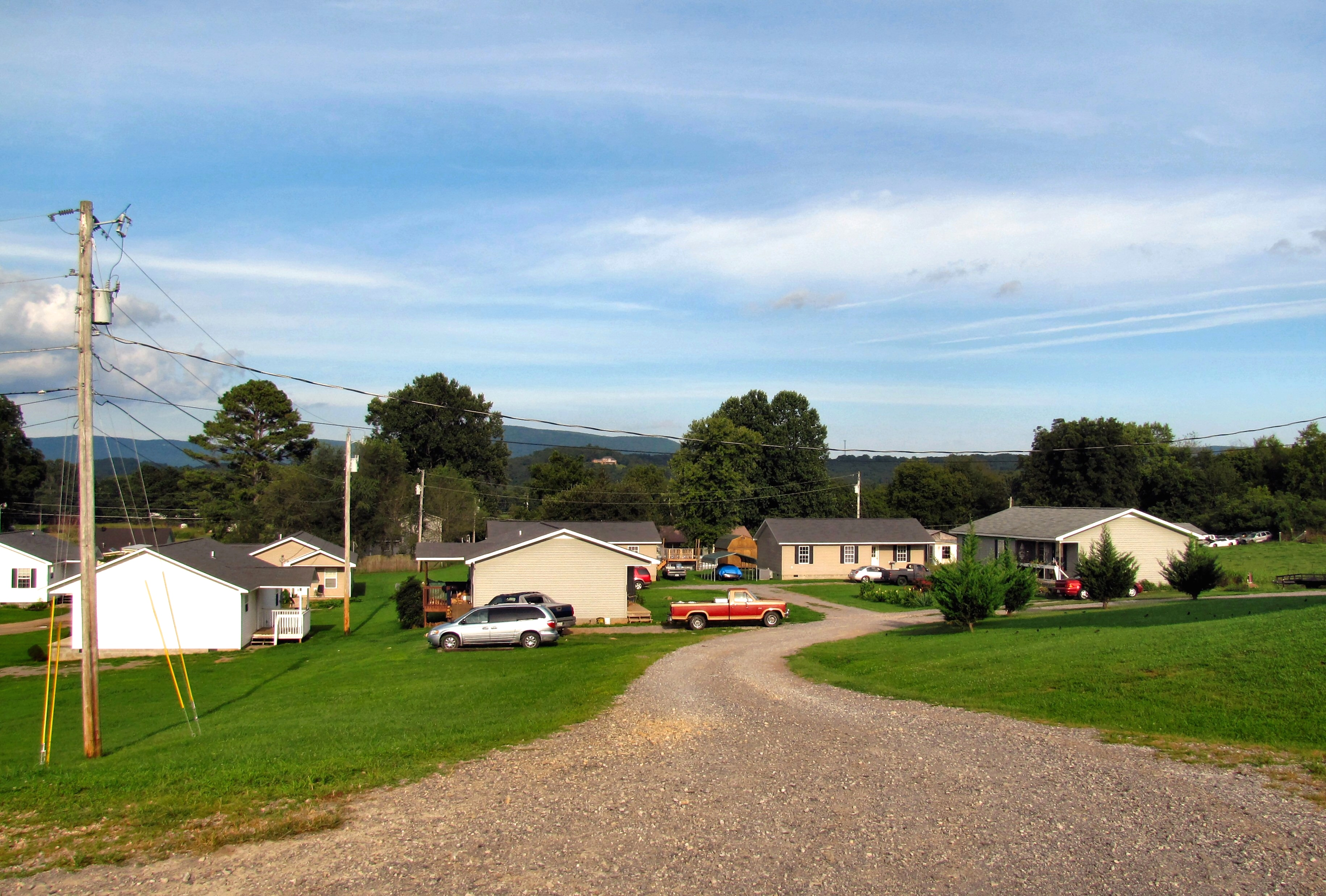
- Houses off Valley View Road in Sequatchie

- Location within Tennessee Location within the United States
- Coordinates: 35°06′56″N 85°35′37″W
- Country: United States
- State: Tennessee
- County: Marion

Area
  - Total: 1.03 sq mi (2.68 km^{2})
  - Land: 1.03 sq mi (2.68 km^{2})
  - Water: 0 sq mi (0.00 km^{2})
- Elevation: 656 ft (200 m)

Population (2020)
  - Total: 622
  - Density: 601.0/sq mi (232.06/km^{2})
- Time zone: UTC-6 (Central (CST))
  - Summer (DST): UTC-5 (CDT)
- ZIP code: 37374
- Area code: 423
- GNIS feature ID: 1292594

Sequatchie is an unincorporated community in Marion County, Tennessee, United States. Its ZIP code is 37374. The community lies in the southwestern Sequatchie Valley at the base of the Cumberland Plateau. The Little Sequatchie River passes to the north and east of the community. Valley View Road connects Sequatchie with Whitwell to the northeast and Jasper to the southwest.

== Demographics ==
Historical population
Census	Pop.	Note	%±
2020	622		—
U.S. Decennial Census
