= Garner Creek =

Stream in Hickman and Dickson County, Tennessee, U.S.

Coordinates: 35.942286°N 87.468626°W

Garner Creek is a stream in Hickman and Dickson counties, Tennessee, in the United States. It is a tributary to Piney River.

According to tradition, Garner Creek was named from an incident when Colonel William Garner fell into the creek while crossing it, and later settled there.

== See also ==
- List of rivers of Tennessee
