= Stinking Creek (Campbell County, Tennessee) =

Stream in Tennessee

Coordinates: 36°29′45″N 84°06′33″W

Stinking Creek is a stream in Campbell County, Tennessee, in the United States.

Stinking Creek, a sulphur spring, was named on account of its naturally occurring unpleasant odor.

Another theory for the creek's name dates to 1779–1780. This was attributed to many animal deaths during an unusually cold winter and the resulting carrion stench the following spring.

== See also ==
- List of rivers of Tennessee
