= Smith Fork (Tennessee) =

Stream in Hardin County, Tennessee, U.S.

Coordinates: 35.3061893°N 88.1186437°W

Smith Fork is a stream in Hardin County in the U.S. state of Tennessee. It is a tributary to Indian Creek.

Variant names were "Smiths Creek" and "Smiths Fork". Smith Fork has the name of a 19th-century pioneer settler. Smith Fork has a mean annual discharge of 336 cubic feet per second (9.5 cubic metres per second) at Temperance Hall.
