= Indian Creek (Putnam County, Tennessee) =

Coordinates: 36°08′19″N 85°48′07″W

Indian Creek, also known as Big Indian Creek, is a large stream in western Putnam County, Tennessee. It is a tributary of the Caney Fork River.

== Geography ==
The source of the creek is near Baxter, Tennessee, where it starts as a mid-sized ephemeral to intermittent stream and quickly picks up the Boyd Hollow Branch. Upon meeting the Leftwich Hollow Branch and a big spring, the creek becomes perennial.

As the creek grows in size, it begins forming a wide floodplain nestled between some steep hills. After flowing between some of these hills, it picks up one of the streams named Little Indian Creek. Next, it runs through the small unincorporated town of Buffalo Valley, near the creek's lower end. In southwestern Buffalo Valley, I-40 has a bridge over it, and the Buffalo Branch meets the creek just before its confluence with the Caney Fork.

== Little Indian Creek ==
Little Indian Creek is the name of two streams in Putnam County. One of these is a tributary of Indian Creek located entirely within Putnam County, the source of which is near Boma.

The other begins in Putnam County close to Gentry, then it descends through some hills and valleys before getting a wide floodplain and perennial flow similar to the big Indian Creek. Eventually, it briefly forms the Putnam County border with Smith County before crossing fully into Smith. As it enters Cordell Hull Lake in Smith County, its lake embayment borders the Indian Creek Campgrounds just before its confluence with Dillard Creek and ultimately the Cumberland River, less than two miles from Granville.
