= Engine Creek =

Stream in Sevier County, Tennessee, U.S.

Coordinates: 35°44′00″N 83°24′32″W

Engine Creek is a stream in Sevier County, Tennessee, in the United States. It is a tributary of the Little Pigeon River and lies wholly within Great Smoky Mountains National Park.

Engine Creek was so named when a steam engine fell onto the creek bed during transport. Engine Creek was formerly named "'Injun Creek'" and the rename proposal was approved by the United States Geographical Survey Board of Geographic Names in 2020.

== See also ==
- List of rivers of Tennessee
