= Emory River =

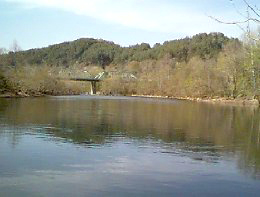
- The Emory River near Oakdale, Tennessee

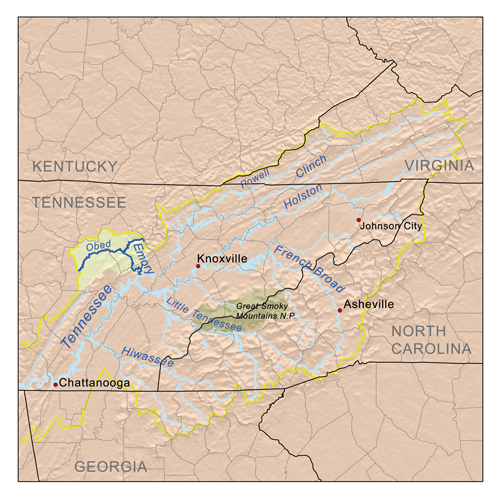
- The Emory/Obed drainage basin

Location
- Country: United States
- State: Tennessee

Physical characteristics
- Source: below Fork Mountain, near Frozen Head State Park in Morgan County
  - coordinates: 36°09′25″N 84°26′47″W
  - elevation: 2,450 ft (750 m)
- Mouth: Clinch River at Kingston, Tennessee
  - coordinates: 35°53′15″N 84°29′29″W
  - elevation: 741 ft (226 m)
- Basin size: 872 sq mi (2,260 km^{2})
- Discharge
  - location: Oakdale, Tennessee, 18.3 miles (29.5 km) above the mouth(mean for water years 1927-1983)
  - average: 1,466 cu ft/s (41.5 m^{3}/s)(mean for water years 1927-1983)
  - minimum: 0 cu ft/s (0 m^{3}/s); Several occasions in 1944, 1952, and 1953
  - maximum: 195,000 cu ft/s (5,500 m^{3}/s); March 1929

Basin features
- Tributaries
  - left: Little Emory River
  - right: Obed River

National Wild and Scenic River
- Designated: October 12, 1976

The Emory River is a river draining a portion of Tennessee's Cumberland Plateau. It flows for just over 46 miles (74 km) from its source near Frozen Head State Park to its mouth along the Clinch River at Kingston, Tennessee.

== Hydrography ==
The Emory River rises on the slopes of Fork Mountain and descends through a valley along the northern base of Bird Mountain, a prominent ridge in Frozen Head State Park in Morgan County. The surrounding area has been the subject of extensive strip mining for coal which has resulted in some stream pollution. The stream initially flows basically westward and is crossed by U.S. Highway 27. Turning more southwestward, it is paralleled for a time by a line of the Norfolk Southern Railway. It meets the Obed River in the southeast corner of the expansive Catoosa Wildlife Management Area, a large game-management area operated by the Tennessee Wildlife Resources Agency.

Still paralleled by the railroad, the stream crosses into Roane County near Harriman. Backwaters of the Watts Bar Lake impoundment of the Tennessee River cause the water below Harriman to be somewhat slack. The Little Emory River is also impounded somewhat above its mouth into the Emory below Harriman.

The mouth of the Emory is into the Clinch River at the Tennessee Valley Authority's Kingston Power Plant, a coal-fired electric generation station initially developed during World War II, largely to power the uranium enrichment plants used to make the world's first atomic bomb at nearby Oak Ridge National Laboratory. The 2008 Kingston Fossil Plant coal fly ash slurry spill heavily polluted the Emory River and surrounding area.

== Etymology ==
According to a 1910 article in the Rockwood Times by Captain William E. McElwee, the river was named after "William Emery", an early traveler who drowned while swimming the river with his "accoutrements" on. Early deed books sometimes refer to this as "William Emeries River". The Indian name for the Emory River was "Babahatchie", which means "babbling waters."

== See also ==
- List of Tennessee rivers
