= Little Duck River =

Coordinates: 35.4527778°N 86.0630556°W

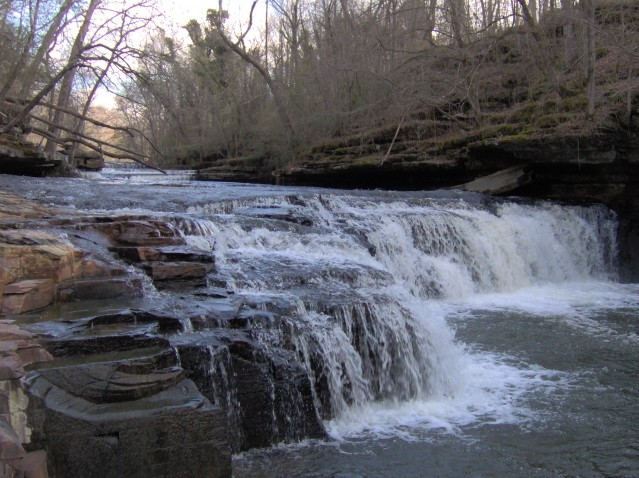
- The Little Duck River

Location
- Country: United States
- State: Tennessee

Physical characteristics
- Source
  - location: Manchester, Tennessee
- Mouth
  - location: Duck River
  - elevation: 902 ft (275 m)
- Length: 6.5 mi (10.5 km)

The Little Duck River is a 6.5-mile-long (10.5 km) tributary of the Duck River of Tennessee in the United States. Via the Duck, Tennessee, and Ohio rivers, it is part of the Mississippi River watershed. It rises in a poorly drained, swampy area southeast of Manchester, Tennessee and winds through the town.

Its significance is primarily in its spectacular confluence with the main Duck River, just northwest of downtown Manchester in Old Stone Fort State Park. Both streams descend over a series of dramatic cascades just prior to the confluence, which occurs at the base of a table land which they surround on three sides. The perimeter of this table land is surrounded by a low stone wall generally 2 to 4 feet (0.6 to 1.2 m) in height.

== See also ==
- List of rivers of Tennessee
