= Ugly =

Ugly may refer to:

- Ugliness, a property of a person or thing that is unpleasant to look at, listen to or contemplate

== Music ==
=== Albums ===
- Ugly (Life of Agony album), 1995
- Ugly (Screaming Females album), 2012
- Ugly (soundtrack), 2014 by G. V. Prakash Kumar
- Ugly (Slowthai album), 2023, or the title track

=== Songs ===
- "Ugly" (Bubba Sparxxx song), 2001
- "Ugly" (Fantasia song), 2016
- Ugly (The Gazette song), 2015
- "Ugly" (Jaira Burns song), 2017
- "Ugly" (Jon Bon Jovi song), 1998
- "Ugly" (Russ song), 2021
- "Ugly" (Sevendust song), 2005
- "Ugly" (Sugababes song), 2005
- "U.G.L.Y.", by Daphne & Celeste, 2000
- "Ugly", by 2NE1 on their EP 2NE1
- "Ugly", by Ella Henderson from her second album Everything I Didn't Say (2022)
- "Ugly", by The Exies from their album Head for the Door, 2004
- "Ugly", by Juliana Hatfield on her album Hey Babe
- "Ugly", by Nas on his album Magic
- "Ugly", by Pooh Shiesty on his album Shiesty Season
- "Ugly", by The Smashing Pumpkins on their single "1979"
- "Ugly", by XXXTentacion from his final album Bad Vibes Forever (2019)

== Other ==
- Ugly (film), a 2013 film
- "Ugly" (House), a television series episode
- "Ugly", an autobiography by Constance Briscoe
- Ugly Creek (disambiguation)
- Ugly Models, a modelling and actors' agency in London, UK
- Ugly Mountain, a mountain in the U.S. state of West Virginia

== See also ==
- Uglies, a 2005 science fiction novel by Scott Westerfeld
- Ugli fruit or Jamaican tangelo
- Ugley, a village in Essex, England, United Kingdom
