= List of rivers of Tennessee =

This is a list of rivers of the U.S. state of Tennessee:

== By drainage basin ==
This list is arranged by drainage basin, with respective tributaries indented under each larger stream's name. All rivers in Tennessee ultimately flow to the Gulf of Mexico.

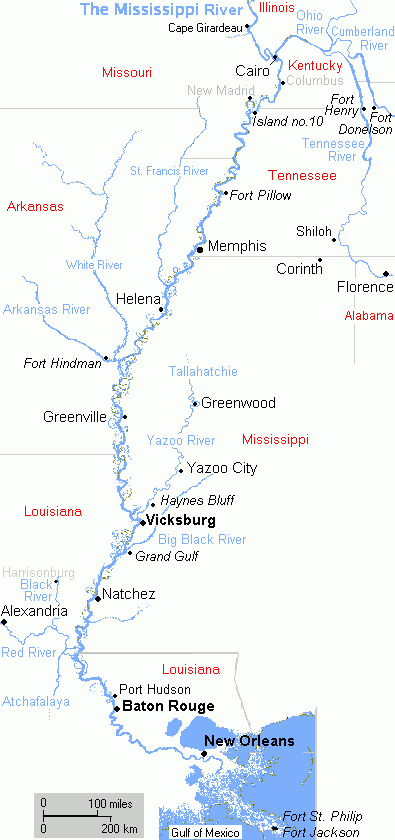
Lower Mississippi River

=== Mississippi River drainage basin ===
- Mississippi River
  - Lake McKellar
    - Nonconnah Creek
  - Wolf River
  - Loosahatchie River
  - Hatchie River
    - Tuscumbia River
  - Forked Deer River
    - North Fork
    - Middle Fork
    - South Fork
  - Obion River
    - North Fork
    - Middle Fork
    - South Fork
    - Rutherford Fork

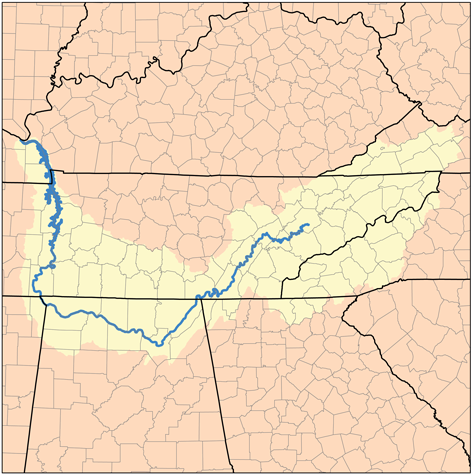
Tennessee River drainage basin

  - Ohio River (KY)
    - Tennessee River
      - Blood River
      - Big Sandy River
      - White Oak Creek
      - Duck River
        - Buck Branch
        - Big Swan Creek
          - Copperas Branch
        - Buffalo River
          - Green River
          - Little Buffalo River
          - Cane Creek
            - Cave Branch
        - Piney River
          - Plunders Creek
          - Garner Creek
        - Defeated Creek
        - Little Duck River
      - Beech River
      - Indian Creek
        - Smith Fork
      - Shoal Creek/Sycamore River
      - Elk River
        - Richland Creek
      - Flint River
      - Sequatchie River
        - Little Sequatchie River
      - Hiwassee River
        - Ocoee River
        - Conasauga Creek
      - Piney River
        - Soak Creek
          - Little Piney Creek
      - Sewee Creek

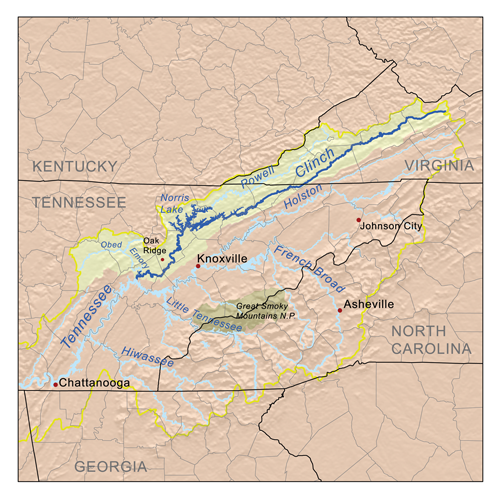
Clinch River drainage basin

      - Clinch River
        - Emory River
          - Little Emory River
          - Obed River
            - Little Obed River
        - Poplar Creek
          - East Fork Poplar Creek
        - Beaver Creek
        - Bull Run Creek
        - Coal Creek
        - Powell River
      - Sweetwater Creek
      - Little Tennessee River
        - Tellico River
          - Bald River
          - North River
      - Little River
      - French Broad River
        - Little Pigeon River
        - Nolichucky River
        - Pigeon River

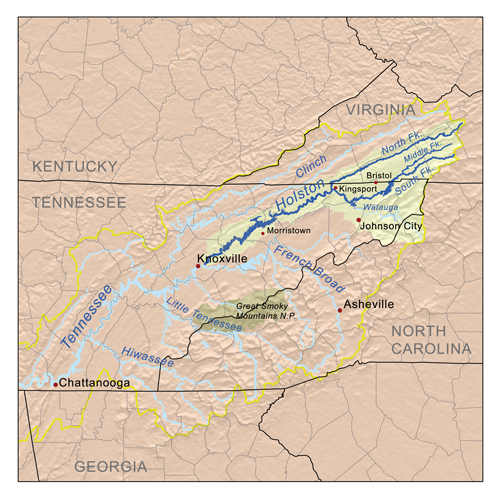
Holston River drainage basin

      - Holston River
        - North Fork Holston River
        - South Fork Holston River
          - Watauga River
            - Doe River
              - Little Doe River
            - Elk River
            - Roan Creek

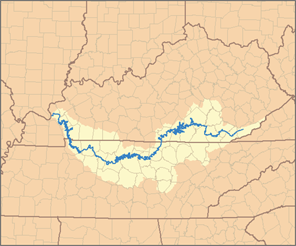
Cumberland River drainage basin

    - Cumberland River
      - Red River
        - Passenger Creek
      - Harpeth River
        - Little Harpeth River
          - Otter Creek
      - Richland Creek
      - Mill Creek
        - Sevenmile Creek
      - Stones River
        - Overall Creek
      - Plunkett Creek
      - Caney Fork
        - Hickman Creek
        - Smith Fork Creek
          - Clear Fork
          - Saunders Fork
        - Indian Creek
          - Little Indian Creek
        - Mine Lick Creek
        - Falling Water River
        - Collins River
          - Barren Fork
        - Rocky River
        - Calfkiller River
        - Cane Creek
      - Defeated Creek
      - Dillard Creek
        - Little Indian Creek
      - Martin Creek
      - Flynn Creek
      - Jennings Creek
      - Roaring River
        - Blackburn Fork River
        - Spring Creek
      - Obey River
        - Wolf River
          - Rotten Fork Wolf River
        - East Fork Obey River
        - West Fork Obey River
      - Big South Fork of the Cumberland River
        - Clear Fork
        - New River
      - Clear Fork (Cumberland River tributary)
        - Stinking Creek

=== Mobile River drainage basin ===
- Mobile River (AL)
  - Alabama River (AL)
    - Coosa River (AL, GA)
      - Oostanaula River (GA)
        - Conasauga River

== Alphabetically ==
River located partially in another state

River	Mouth	Length	Largest settlement	Map
Bald River	Tellico River	6 mi	none (Cherokee National Forest)	
Barren Fork	Collins River	23.4 mi (37.7 km)	McMinnville	
Beaver Creek	Clinch River	44 mi	Halls Crossroads	
Bull Run Creek	Clinch River	40 mi	Paulette	
Beech River	Tennessee River	38.3 mi (61.6 km)	Lexington	
Big Sandy River	Tennessee River	60 mi (97 km)	Bruceton	
Big South Fork of the Cumberland River	Cumberland River	76 mi (122 km)	none (Big South Fork National River and Recreation Area)	
Blackburn Fork River	Roaring River	14.5 mi	none (Cummins Falls State Park)	
Blood River	Tennessee River		Buchanan	
Buffalo River	Duck River	125 mi (201 km)	Linden	
Calfkiller River	Caney Fork River	42.4 mi (68.2 km)	Sparta	
Cane Creek (Caney Fork River tributary)	Caney Fork River			
Caney Fork River	Cumberland River	143 mi (230 km)	Carthage	
Clear Fork (Big South Fork Cumberland River tributary)	Big South Fork of the Cumberland River	27.2 mi (43.8 km)	Rugby	
Clear Fork (Cumberland River tributary)	Cumberland River	42.8 mi (68.9 km)	Clairfield	
Clear Fork (Smith Fork Creek tributary)	Smith Fork Creek			
Chickamauga Creek	Tennessee River		Chattanooga	
Clinch River	Tennessee River	337 mi (542 km)	Oak Ridge	
Coal Creek	Clinch River	10.3 mi (16.6 km)	Rocky Top	
Collins River	Caney Fork River	67 mi (108 km)	Gruetli-Laager	
Conasauga Creek	Hiwassee River	42.8 mi (68.9 km)	Coker Creek	
Conasauga River	Oostanaula River	93 mi (150 km)	Conasauga (Polk County)	
Cumberland River	Ohio River	688 mi (1107 km)	Nashville	
Defeated Creek (Hickman County)	Duck River			
Defeated Creek (Smith County)	Cumberland River		Defeated	
Doe River	Watauga River	6 mi	Elizabethton	
Duck River	Tennessee River	284 mi (457 km)	Columbia	
East Fork Poplar Creek	Poplar Creek		Oak Ridge	
Elk River (Watauga River tributary)	Watauga River		Elk Mills	
Elk River (Tennessee River tributary)	Tennessee River	195 mi (314 km)	Fayetteville	
Emory River	Clinch River	46 mi (74 km)	Harriman	
Falling Water River	Caney Fork River	46.8 mi (75.3 km)	Cookeville	
Flint River	Tennessee River	65.7 mi (105.6 km)	Flintville	
Forked Deer River	Obion River		Dyersburg	
French Broad River	Tennessee River	219 mi (352 km)	Knoxville	
Green River	Buffalo River	21.1 mi (34.0 km)	Waynesboro	
Harpeth River	Cumberland River	115 mi (185 km)	Franklin	
Hatchie River	Mississippi River	238 mi (383 km)	Bolivar	
Hickman Creek				
Hiwassee River	Tennessee River	147 mi (237 km)	Charleston	
Holston River	Tennessee River	136 mi (219 km)	Kingsport	
Indian Creek (Caney Fork River tributary)	Caney Fork River		Buffalo Valley (Putnam County)	
Indian Creek (Tennessee River tributary)	Tennessee River		Crossroads	
Injun Creek	Little Pigeon River		none (Great Smoky Mountains National Park)	
Little Buffalo River	Buffalo River		Deerfield	
Little Doe River	Doe River		Hampton	
Little Duck River	Duck River	6.5 mi (10.5 km)	Manchester	
Little Emory River	Emory River		Coalfield	
Little Harpeth River	Harpeth River	16.3 mi (26.2 km)	Brentwood	
Little Indian Creek	Indian Creek (Caney Fork River tributary)			
Little Obed River	Obed River	10 mi (16 km)	Crossville	

- Bald River
- Barren Fork
- Beaver Creek
- Bull Run Creek
- Beech River
- Big Sandy River
- Big South Fork of the Cumberland River
- Big Swan Creek
- Blackburn Fork River
- Blood River
- Buffalo River
- Calfkiller River
- Cane Creek (Caney Fork River tributary)
- Caney Fork
- Clear Fork (Big South Fork Cumberland River tributary)
- Clear Fork (Cumberland River tributary)
- Clear Fork (Smith Fork Creek tributary)
- Chickamauga Creek
- Clinch River
- Coal Creek
- Collins River
- Conasauga Creek
- Conasauga River
- Copperas Branch
- Cumberland River
- Defeated Creek (Hickman County, Tennessee)
- Defeated Creek (Smith County, Tennessee)
- Doe River
- Duck River
- East Fork Poplar Creek
- Elk River (North Carolina - Tennessee), tributary of the Watauga River
- Elk River (Tennessee), tributary of the Tennessee River
- Emory River
- Falling Water River
- Flint River
- Forked Deer River
- French Broad River
- Green River
- Harpeth River
- Hatchie River
- Hickman Creek
- Hiwassee River
- Holston River
- Indian Creek (Caney Fork River tributary)
- Indian Creek (Powell River tributary)
- Indian Creek (Tennessee River tributary)
- Injun Creek
- Little Buffalo River
- Little Doe River
- Little Duck River
- Little Emory River
- Little Harpeth River
- Little Indian Creek
- Little Obed River
- Little Pigeon River
- Little Piney Creek
- Little River
- Little Sequatchie River
- Little Tennessee River
- Loosahatchie River
- Louse Creek
- Mill Creek
- Mine Lick Creek
- Mississippi River
- New River
- Nolichucky River
- Nonconnah Creek
- North River
- Obed River
- Obey River
- Obion River
- Ocoee River
- Otter Creek
- Overall Creek
- Pigeon River
- Piney River (East Tennessee)
- Piney River (Middle Tennessee)
- Plunders Creek
- Plunkett Creek
- Poplar Creek
- Powell River
- Red River
- Roan Creek
- Roaring River
- Rocky River
- Rotten Fork Wolf River
- Soak Creek
- Sequatchie River
- Sevenmile Creek
- Sewee Creek
- Shoal Creek
- Smith Fork
- Smith Fork Creek
- Spring Creek
- Stinking Creek
- Stones River
- Sweetwater Creek
- Tellico River
- Tennessee River
- Tuscumbia River
- Watauga River
- White Oak Creek
- Wolf River (Middle Tennessee), tributary of the Obey River
- Wolf River (West Tennessee), tributary of the Mississippi River

== See also ==
- List of rivers in the United States
