= Mine Lick Creek =

Coordinates: 36°02′45″N 85°43′43″W

Mine Lick Creek is a tributary of the Caney Fork River in and near Baxter, Tennessee.

Mine Lick Creek suffered significant pollution for nearly three decades, causing a Water Contact Advisory to be issued by TDEC for 0.5 miles of the creek in Baxter. This lasted from 1986 to 2015, and the water quality improving to safe levels was a moment of celebration among Baxter residents.

The creek becomes dry before it runs into Center Hill Lake, but it is big enough that the valley it created contains a significant embayment of the lake.
