= Beaver Creek (Tennessee) =

Coordinates: 36.109°N 83.867°W

Location
- Location: Northern Knox County, Tennessee, United States

Physical characteristics
- Source
  - elevation: 1,076 ft (328 m)
- Mouth
  - location: Clinch River
- Basin size: 86.5 mi^{2} (224 km^{2})

Beaver Creek is a tributary of the Clinch River in Knox County in East Tennessee. It drains a watershed area of 86.5 square miles (224 km^{2}) between Copper Ridge and Black Oak Ridge. It flows from northeast to southwest from the Gibbs High School area, through the Halls, Powell, Karns, Solway, and Hardin Valley communities, entering the Clinch downstream from Solway. Beaver Creek is the site of the new Knox county water trail. When completed, it will allow over 40 miles of navigable water by kayak or canoe. The Beaver Creek Kayak Club is a local float club that is dedicated to the clean up, preservation and promotion of the Beaver Creek watershed.

== See also ==
- List of rivers of Tennessee
