= Boma, Tennessee =

Boma is an unincorporated railroad town in Putnam County, Tennessee. It is located at the intersection of the Old Baxter Road and Tightfit Road. The Tightfit Cemetery in Boma is described by Denny-Loftis Genealogy as being on a ridge immediately adjacent to Buffalo Valley, where Tightfit Road leads directly to from the cemetery.
