= Conasauga Creek =

Stream in Polk, McMinn, and Monroe counties in Tennessee, United States

Coordinates: 35.2211847°N 84.6193789°W

Location
- Country: United States
- Location: Tennessee

Physical characteristics
- Source
  - location: Unicoi Range
- Mouth
  - location: Hiwassee River
  - elevation: 692 ft (211 m)
- Length: 42.8 mi (68.9 km)

Conasauga Creek is a 42.8-mile-long (68.9 km) tributary stream of the Hiwassee River, located in southeast Tennessee, United States. It is not to be confused with the nearby Conasauga River.

== Course ==
Conasauga Creek flows from its source in the Unicoi Range (part of the Appalachian Mountains) in Monroe County. It flows by the town of Coker Creek and, following a generally northeast route, passes between Mocking Crow Mountain and Pine Mountain to emerge into the valley of Rural Vale. From there it curves around the northern end of Starr Mountain, turning east and then southeast. Starr Mountain marks the boundary between the higher mountains of the southern Blue Ridge Mountains and the lower ridges of the Ridge-and-valley Appalachians.

After emerging from the higher mountains, Conasauga Creek passes by the town of Etowah in Mcminn County, before discharging into the Hiwassee River in Polk County.

== History ==
The valley of Conasauga Creek was the route of the Warrior Path that connected the Cherokee towns of Great Hiwassee on the Hiwassee River to Great Tellico on the Tellico River.

== See also ==
- List of rivers of Tennessee
