= Little Sequatchie River =

Coordinates: 35.3014644°N 85.6444152°W

Location
- Country: United States
- State: Tennessee

Physical characteristics
- Source
  - location: Cumberland Plateau
- Mouth
  - location: Sequatchie River
  - elevation: 607 ft (185 m)
- Length: 19.6 mi (31.5 km)

The Little Sequatchie River is a 19.6-mile-long (31.5 km) tributary of the Sequatchie River in Tennessee. Unlike its larger namesake, it does not have a spectacular large spring source but is the result of the confluence of many smaller streams in a very remote, scenic area of the Cumberland Plateau along the line between Grundy County and Marion County. It flows down a narrow valley, basically south. Its mouth is near the community of Sequatchie (also rendered "Sequachee").

== See also ==
- List of rivers of Tennessee
