= Plunders Creek =

Stream in Hickman and Dickson County, Tennessee, U.S.

Coordinates: 35.9603413°N 87.4619593°W

Plunders Creek is a stream in Hickman and Dickson counties, Tennessee, in the United States. It is a tributary to the Piney River.

Plunders Creek was named after "Old Plunder", a hunting dog that was killed by a bear near the creek.

== See also ==
- List of rivers of Tennessee
