= Piney River (Middle Tennessee) =

Coordinates: 35°49′9″N 87°33′34″W

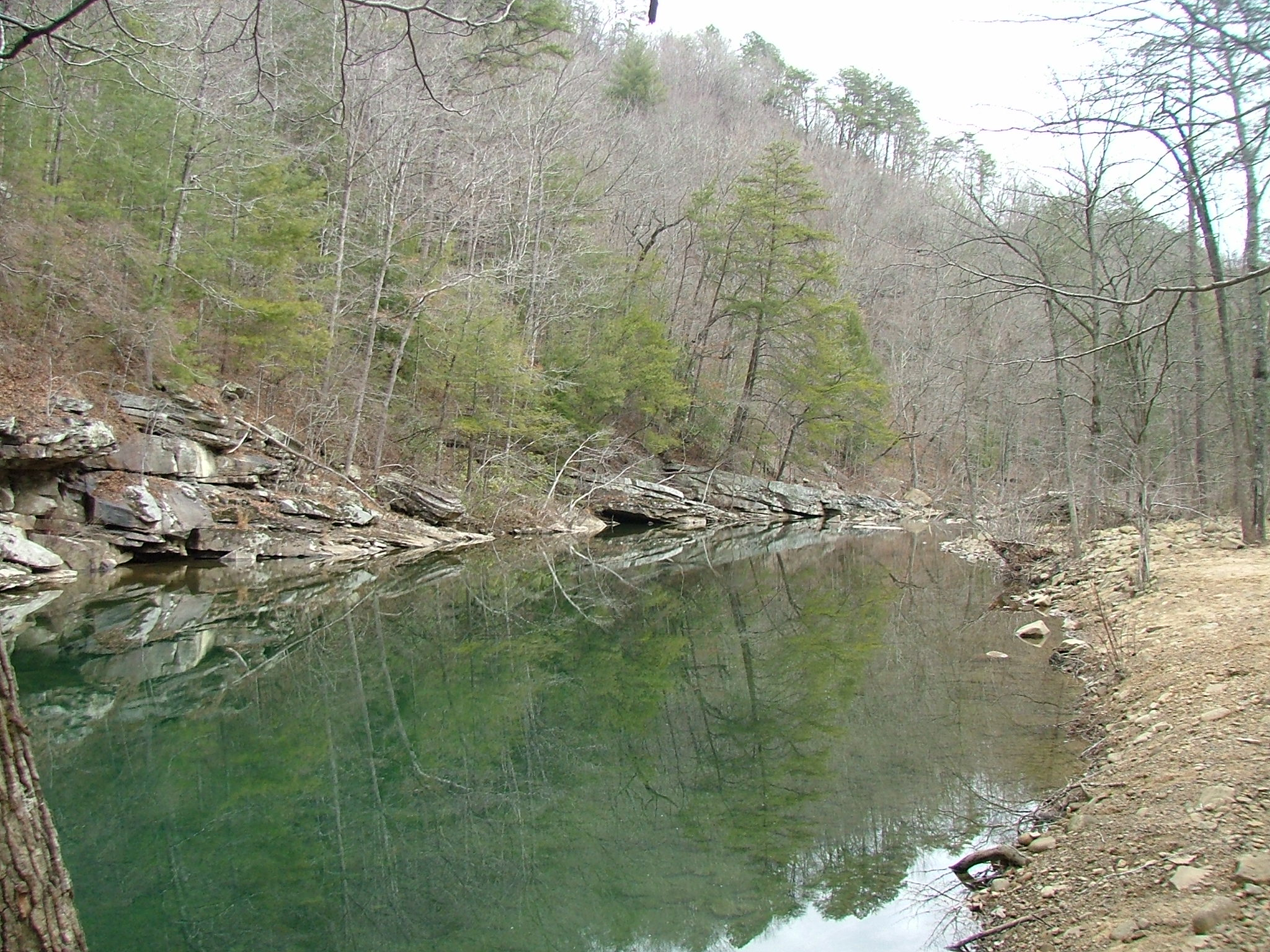
- Piney River

Location
- Country: United States
- State: Tennessee

Physical characteristics
- Source
  - location: Dickson County, Tennessee
- Mouth
  - location: Duck River
- Length: 23.7 mi (38.1 km)

The Piney River is a 23.7-mile-long (38.1 km) tributary of the Duck River in Middle Tennessee in the United States. Via the Duck River, the Tennessee River, and the Ohio River, it is part of the Mississippi River watershed. The headwater tributaries of the Piney River rise in Dickson County, Tennessee, near the city of Dickson. Dickson is located on the "Tennessee Valley Divide", which corresponds for some distance with the downtown's Main Street. The western part of the town, the part in the Tennessee Valley (as opposed to the Cumberland Valley), is drained by the East Piney River, a tributary to the Piney. Other tributaries include Garner Creek and Plunders Creek.

The city lakes, formerly a water supply source and the site of an early electrical power plant even before this, are on a Piney River tributary, as was a former city sewer plant, which was closed when a larger water intake was built further down on the Piney. The upper reaches of the Piney were inadequate for the area's needs, and a pipeline to the Cumberland River in the north end of the county has now been completed, relieving the Piney of the burden of supplying the water needs to a growing community that threatened soon to exhaust it.

The West and East Piney rivers flow together near the community of Mount Sinai; this confluence marks the true head of the stream. The stream flows from this point south-southeast into Hickman County, where it meets the waters of the Duck River a few miles west-northwest of Centerville. The Piney's major tributary in Hickman County is Mill Creek, a scenic stream which is frequently stocked with trout by the Tennessee Wildlife Resources Agency.

In August 2021 a rain system produced up to 17 inches (430 mm) of rain in the area within 24 hours. The resulting flash flooding was responsible for more than twenty deaths.

== See also ==
- List of rivers of Tennessee
