= Mill Creek (Davidson County, Tennessee) =

Coordinates: 36°07′30″N 86°43′14″W

Location
- Country: United States
- State: Tennessee

Physical characteristics
- Source
  - location: Nolensville, Tennessee
  - elevation: 394 ft (120 m)
- Mouth
  - location: Cumberland River
- Length: 27.9 mi (44.9 km)

Mill Creek is a 27.9-mile-long (44.9 km) tributary of the Cumberland River that extends through Williamson and Davidson counties in the U.S. state of Tennessee. Via the Cumberland and Ohio rivers, it is part of the Mississippi River watershed. The creek begins near Nolensville, Tennessee, and continues into Metropolitan Nashville, winding through Antioch, Cane Ridge, South Nashville, and Donelson, before flowing into the Cumberland about 2 miles (3 km) upstream from downtown Nashville. It is prone to flooding, and was the first site of major flooding during the 2010 Tennessee floods. At least five people were killed as a result of the creek's raging flash flood, and millions of dollars of property damage was reported along Mill Creek.

Mill Creek is the only known habitat in the world for the endangered Nashville Crayfish.

== See also ==
- List of rivers of Tennessee
