= Watts Bar Reservoir =

Reservoir in Tennessee, United States

Watts Bar Lake
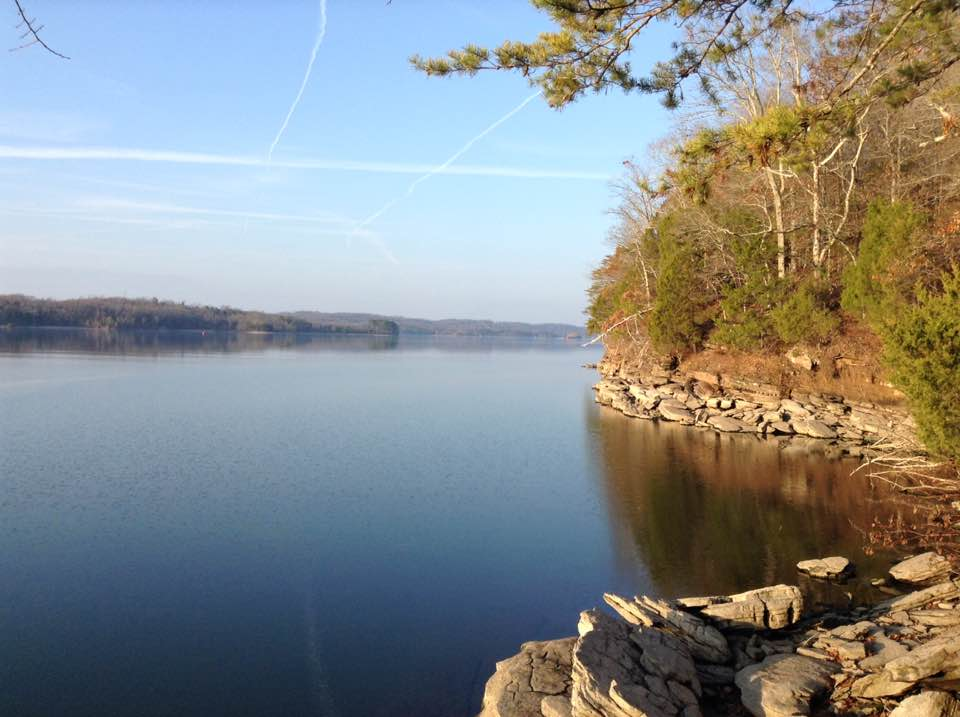
- View from just north of TVA Watts Bar in Decatur, Tennessee

- Location within Tennessee Location within the United States
- Location: Meigs / Rhea / Roane / Loudon counties, Tennessee, U.S.
- Coordinates: 35°37′15″N 84°46′54″W
- Type: reservoir
- Primary inflows: Tennessee River, Clinch River, Emory River
- Primary outflows: Tennessee River
- Basin countries: United States
- Max. length: 72.4 m (238 ft)
- Surface area: 39,000 acres (16,000 ha; 61 sq mi)
- Max. depth: 108 ft (33 m)
- Surface elevation: 741 feet (226 m)

Watts Bar Reservoir is a reservoir on the Tennessee River created by Watts Bar Dam as part of the Tennessee Valley Authority system.

== Geography ==
Watts Bar Reservoir is located in the U.S. state of Tennessee about midway between the cities of Chattanooga and Knoxville. It begins as the Tennessee River below Fort Loudoun Dam (35°47′30″N 84°14′34″W) in Lenoir City, Tennessee and stretches 72.4 miles (116.5 km) to Watts Bar Dam (35°37′15″N 84°46′55″W), near Spring City, Tennessee. The Clinch River connects to the main channel of the lake at mile 568 (35°51′50″N 84°31′50″W) near Southwest Point (site of Andrew Jackson and John Sevier's 1803 confrontation) in Kingston, Tennessee. The widening of the Clinch by the lake makes that river navigable all the way up to Melton Hill Dam (35°53′5″N 84°18′0″W), which is equipped with a navigation lock allowing navigation upstream through Oak Ridge and Clinton. The partially navigable Emory River connects with the Clinch near the TVA's Kingston Steam Plant just upriver from the meeting with the Tennessee. Including the Clinch and Emory arms, Watts Bar has 722 miles (1,160 km) of shoreline and over 39,000 acres (160 km^{2}) of water surface. Minor tributaries include Poplar Creek, Caney Creek, and White's Creek. The lake contains several large islands, most notably Thief Neck Island, Long Island, and Sand Island.

== History ==
Watts Bar Lake was affected by the 2008 Kingston Fossil Plant coal fly ash slurry spill.

== Recreation ==
Watts Bar's sport fishing ratings for crappie, black crappie, largemouth bass, and spotted bass are at or near the top in the TVA system. (The state of Tennessee advises against eating fish caught in certain areas of the lake due to PCB contamination.) The area also provides many opportunities for birdwatching, with an extremely large population of great blue herons, over 120 nesting pairs of osprey, and a few bald eagles living on or near the lake. Several parks and camps are located on the lake, including the John Knox Center and the Boy Scout facility Camp Buck Toms.
