= Indian Creek (Tennessee River tributary) =

Stream in Tennessee, U.S.

Coordinates: 35.383965°N 88.141978°W

Indian Creek is a stream in the U.S. state of Tennessee. It is a tributary to the Tennessee River.

Indian Creek was named for the Native American Indians of the area.
