= Buffalo Valley, Tennessee =

- Unincorporated community
- Location within Tennessee Location within the United States
- Coordinates: 36°08′29″N 85°47′12″W
- Country: United States
- State: Tennessee
- County: Putnam
- Elevation: 518 ft (158 m)
- Time zone: UTC-6 (Central (CST))
  - Summer (DST): UTC-5 (CDT)
- ZIP code: 38548
- Area code: 931
- GNIS feature ID: 1278920

Buffalo Valley is an unincorporated town in far western Putnam County, Tennessee, United States. The zipcode is: 38548. The town could be described as a ghost town.

== History ==
There was much activity in Buffalo Valley at an early date. There was a grist mill before 1803. At its height, Buffalo Valley was a transportation hub with three grist mills, four general stores, a pole and timber yard, several livestock dealers, a produce dealer, a bank and two blacksmith shops. Evidence of such activity is still present today.

Flooding was a major cause of the town's decline. In the early 20th century, Buffalo Valley suffered one flood that swept away a railroad bridge and another that devastated the entire town. In the late 1990s, a scene for the movie The Green Mile was filmed in Buffalo Valley. The film utilized a railway bridge which crosses the Caney Fork River for a scene involving John Coffey (Michael Clarke Duncan).

As of 2019, the old Buffalo Valley School turned 90 years old. What remains of the flood-prone town are some houses, an active church, an abandoned church, a post office downtown, a few abandoned stores and the old school building (now a community center and library).

== Geography and Environment ==
=== Topography and Hydrology ===
The southwest end of town is located at the confluence of the Caney Fork River and Big Indian Creek, with the rest of the town being along the creek which extends as far east as areas adjacent to Boma's Tightfit Cemetery. The area near town has abundant streams, rolling hills and large green pastures.

=== Flora and fauna ===
Long before settlement was made, there was a huge canebrake of Arundinaria gigantea (river cane) in the area. American bison would descend from the nearby Highland Rim to the valley to graze in the winter; the town was named when a particularly large one was killed.

=== Climate ===
Buffalo Valley's climate is humid subtropical (Köppen Cfa, Trewartha Cfak), giving the area mild winters and hot, humid summers. Precipitation is generally highest in spring and lowest in August to October, although a secondary peak does occur in December. On average, there are 208 sunny days, 37.4 days of highs over 90 °F (32 °C), 76.9 days of sub-freezing lows, 0.3 days of lows below 0 °F (−18 °C) and 106.8 days with at least 0.1 inches of precipitation.

Climate data for Buffalo Valley, Tennessee
Month	Jan	Feb	Mar	Apr	May	Jun	Jul	Aug	Sep	Oct	Nov	Dec	Year
Mean daily maximum °F (°C)	46.8 (8.2)	51.4 (10.8)	60.7 (15.9)	70.2 (21.2)	77.8 (25.4)	85.6 (29.8)	88.9 (31.6)	88.5 (31.4)	82.6 (28.1)	71.9 (22.2)	61.7 (16.5)	49.9 (9.9)	69.7 (20.9)
Daily mean °F (°C)	37.15 (2.86)	40.70 (4.83)	48.95 (9.42)	57.90 (14.39)	66.30 (19.06)	74.80 (23.78)	78.45 (25.81)	77.45 (25.25)	70.90 (21.61)	59.70 (15.39)	50.50 (10.28)	40.10 (4.50)	58.60 (14.78)
Mean daily minimum °F (°C)	27.5 (−2.5)	30.0 (−1.1)	37.2 (2.9)	45.6 (7.6)	54.8 (12.7)	64.0 (17.8)	68.0 (20.0)	66.4 (19.1)	59.2 (15.1)	47.5 (8.6)	39.3 (4.1)	30.3 (−0.9)	47.5 (8.6)
Average precipitation inches (mm)	4.4 (110)	4.4 (110)	4.6 (120)	4.0 (100)	5.4 (140)	4.4 (110)	4.8 (120)	3.7 (94)	3.6 (91)	3.3 (84)	4.4 (110)	5.3 (130)	52.3 (1,319)
Average snowfall inches (cm)	2.0 (5.1)	1.4 (3.6)	0.4 (1.0)	0.0 (0.0)	0.0 (0.0)	0.0 (0.0)	0.0 (0.0)	0.0 (0.0)	0.0 (0.0)	0.0 (0.0)	0.0 (0.0)	0.5 (1.3)	4.3 (11)
Source: "Climate in Zip 38548". Bert Sperling.
