= Ugly Creek (Georgia) =

- Location within Georgia Location within the United States

Physical characteristics
- Source
  - coordinates: 32.7259755°N 83.4151731°W
- Mouth
  - coordinates: 32.7640314°N 83.3526673°W

Ugly Creek is a stream in the U.S. state of Georgia. It is a tributary to Alligator Creek.

The name "Ugly Creek" most likely was humorously applied by a surveyor.
