= Buffalo River (Tennessee) =

River in Tennessee, United States

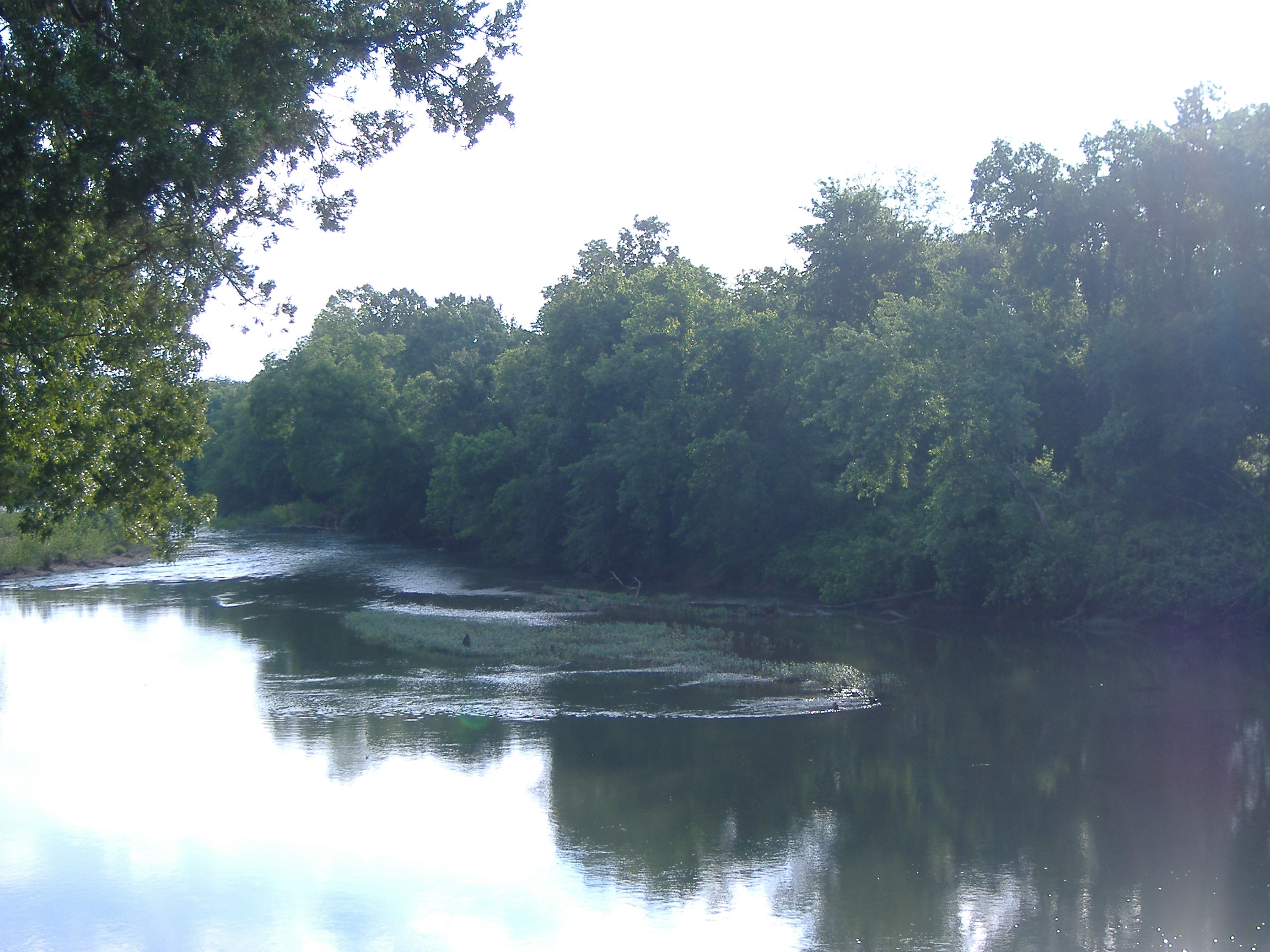

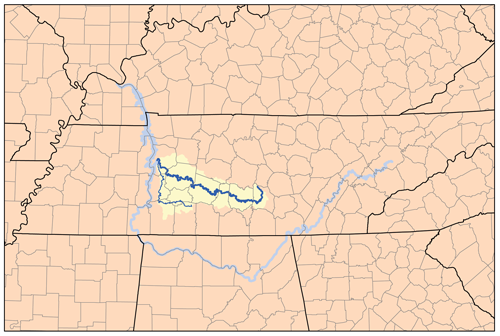
- Duck River watershed showing the Duck and Buffalo rivers

Physical characteristics
- Source
  - location: Confluence of North and South Forks in northern Lawrence County, Tennessee
  - coordinates: 35.3891°N 87.2912°W
  - elevation: 869 ft (265 m)
- Mouth
  - location: confluence with the Duck River in Humphreys County
  - coordinates: 35.9956173°N 87.8391937°W
  - elevation: 361 ft (110 m)
- Length: 125 mi (201 km)
- Basin size: 763 sq mi (1,980 km^{2}) Buffalo River
- Discharge
  - average: Flat Woods: Jan 1,190 cu ft/s (34 m^{3}/s); Feb 1,360 cu ft/s (39 m^{3}/s); Mar 1,420 cu ft/s (40 m^{3}/s) Apr 1,150 cu ft/s (33 m^{3}/s); May 931 cu ft/s (26.4 m^{3}/s); Jun 463 cu ft/s (13.1 m^{3}/s); Jul 376 cu ft/s (10.6 m^{3}/s); Aug 290 cu ft/s (8.2 m^{3}/s); Sep 284 cu ft/s (8.0 m^{3}/s); Oct 304 cu ft/s (8.6 m^{3}/s); Nov 528 cu ft/s (15.0 m^{3}/s); Dec 931 cu ft/s (26.4 m^{3}/s)

Basin features
- Progression: Lawrence County; Lewis County; Wayne County; Perry County; Humphreys County
- River system: Tennessee River Basin
- Tributaries
  - left: Little Buffalo River (Tennessee); Green River (Tennessee)
  - right: Cane Creek
- GNIS: 1305509

The Buffalo River is the longest unimpounded river in Middle Tennessee in the United States. It flows 125 miles (201 km) through the southern and western portions of that region. The Buffalo is the largest tributary of the Duck River. Canoeing is popular, especially in its middle section. The river is named for the Buffalo fish which was abundant when the first European settlers arrived.

== Sources ==
The Buffalo rises in northern Lawrence County. U.S. Highway 43 crosses both the North and South Forks. The highway crosses the North Fork several times as it parallels the river for about 3 miles (5 km). The confluence of the North and South forks about a mile west of Highway 43 is the head of the Buffalo.

== Course ==
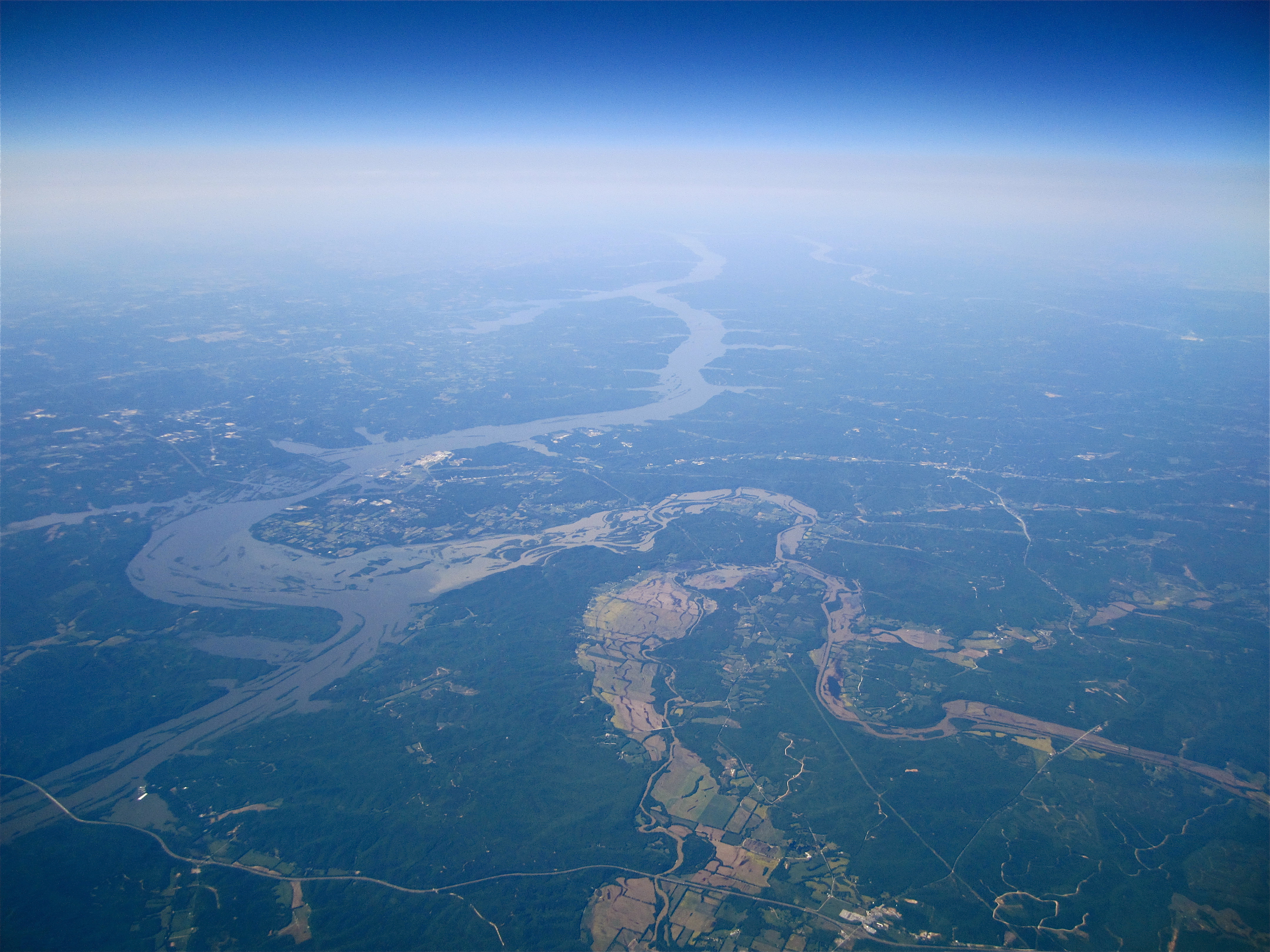
High altitude view of Tennessee River at Humphreys County, Tennessee

Below the confluence, the Buffalo trends northwest for several miles. After entering Lewis County, it intersects the Natchez Trace Parkway. The confluence with the Little Buffalo River occurs in Lewis County followed by smaller tributaries. State Route 99 parallels the river for a distance and then crosses it in the broad Texas Bottoms. In Lewis County, the river continues to meander westward. Entering northern Wayne County, the stream has several more tributaries, notably the Green River.

A few miles below the mouth of the Green River is the community of Flatwoods. Here State Route 13 bridges the Buffalo and then abruptly turns northerly for the balance of its flow. It crosses into Perry County near here. For most of its course through Perry County, the Buffalo roughly parallels State Route 13. Shortly after crossing into Humphreys County, it is bridged by Interstate 40 and then by Bakerville Road. About 8 miles north of this is the mouth of the Buffalo, its confluence with the Duck.

== Watershed ==
The upper Buffalo River, in Lawrence County, is designated a "State Scenic River" under the Tennessee Wild and Scenic Rivers Act.

The only incorporated towns along the Buffalo, Linden and Lobelville, are in Perry County. Two unincorporated communities, Flatwoods and Beardstown are adjacent to the river in Perry County.

=== Hydrology ===
The Buffalo River watershed is the total land area that drains into the Buffalo River. It is designated as Hydrologic Unit Code (HUC) 06040004 by the USGS. It empties into watershed 06040003, the Lower Duck River watershed.

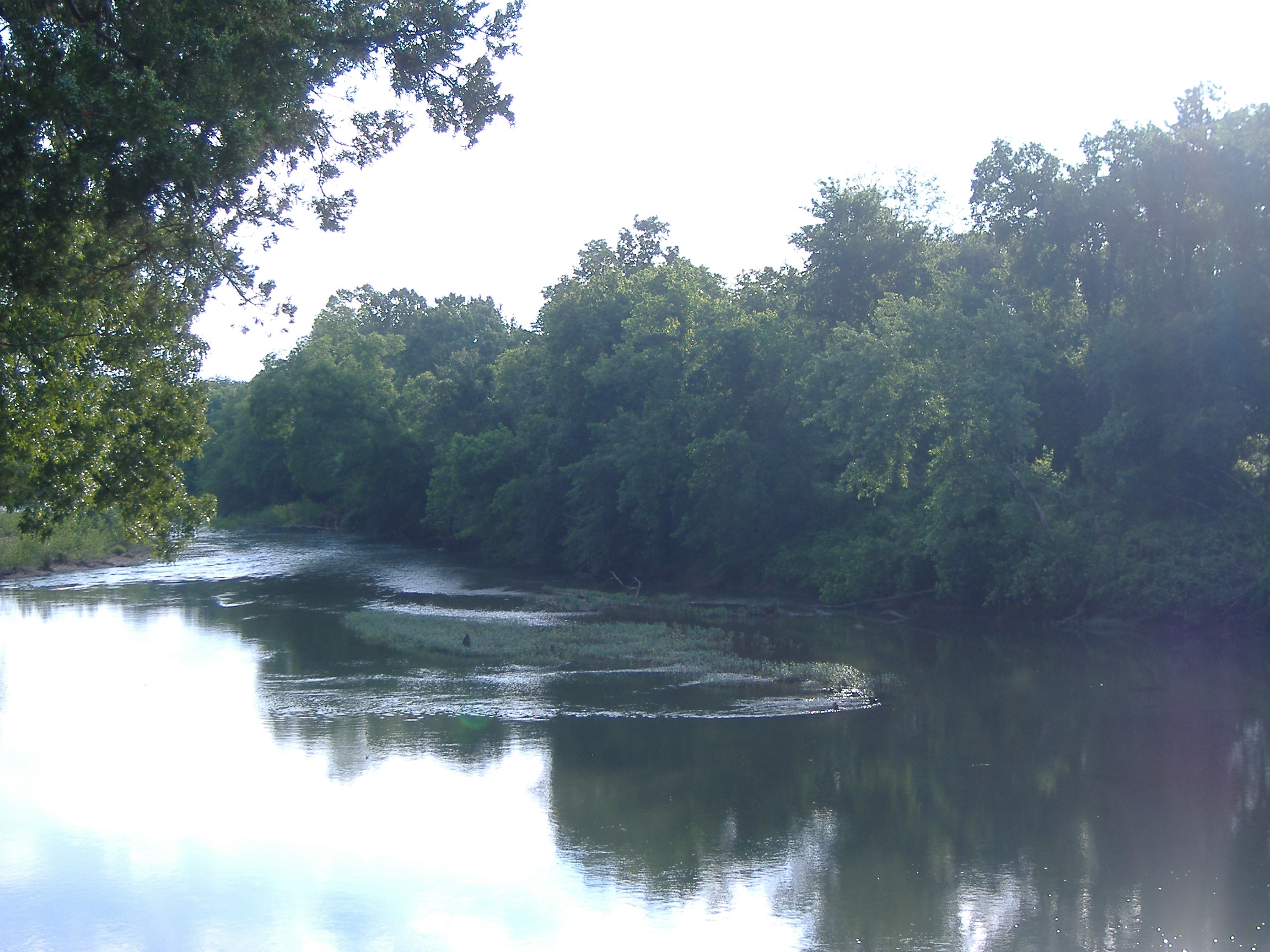
Buffalo River - panoramio

The Buffalo River watershed is composed of three sub-watersheds; two sections of the Buffalo River and the Cane Creek sub-watershed. The southeastern part of the Buffalo River watershed is HUC 0604000401. It includes the headwaters of the Buffalo plus the Little Buffalo River and both Chief Creek and Fortyeight Creek. The western side and northern one-third of the watershed is HUC 0604000402. It reaches from the Green River in Wayne County at the southern end to the mouth of the Buffalo in Humphreys County. Cane Creek, the third part of the watershed is HUC 0604000403. Upper Cane Creek begins at the headwaters of the creek near Hohenwald in Lewis County. Lower Cane Creek includes the mouth at Beardstown in Perry County.

The Buffalo River watershed contains 1,200 miles of tributary streams. Impoundments include 349 lake acres in ponds and water stored behind 10 dams. These dams are primarily in the southeastern portion of the watershed. The majority of the impounded water is in Laurel Hill Lake with 329 acres (133 ha) plus an additional 22 acres (8.9 ha) in the VFW Lake. TDEC has also identified some wetlands sites in the southeastern portion of the watershed.

=== Land use ===
Watershed land is primarily forested: 69% being deciduous, 3% evergreen, and 4% mixed forest. The second significant land use is agricultural crops. Pasture and hay fields account for 10% of the area while row crops occupy another 8%. Residential and commercial areas occupy less than 0.5% of the land.

The soil in the watershed is primarily loam with some silty loam. The soil pH varies from about 4.85 to 5.45. Portions of the area have characteristic karst topography.

== Natural history ==
The Buffalo is rich in aquatic life. Fishing it through passive methods such as limb and trot lines is traditional. There are many catfish and other non-game fish such as drum. The largest aquatic animal usually found in the Buffalo is the alligator snapping turtle. It is often caught (usually unintentionally) on trot and limb lines. These turtles can weigh 50 pounds (23 kg) or more.

TDEC lists 48 rare plant and animal species in the watershed. Rarity typically results from either a small population or a very restricted range. The non-aquatic species include 18 plants, one mammal, three birds, two reptiles, one amphibian, three insects and spiders, and one other invertebrate. There are 20 aquatic species associated with the river or its tributaries; 12 fish, one crustacean, three mussels, and four snails.

=== Fish ===
Identified rare fish in the Buffalo include eight varieties of darters, one madtom catfish (saddled madtom), and one cavefish (southern cavefish). Most of the identified darters are listed as either threatened or endangered by the state and/or federal government (the latter by authority of the Endangered Species Act of 1973).

- Ammocrypta vivax, scaly sand darter
- Cyprinella monacha, turquoise shiner or spotfin chub – Federal threatened status
- Etheostoma aquali, coppercheek darter – State-level threatened status
- Etheostoma boschungi, slackwater darter – Federal threatened status
- Etheostoma cinereum, ashy darter – State-level threatened status
- Etheostoma denoncourti, golden darter
- Etheostoma pseudovulatum, egg-mimic darter – State-level endangered status
- Percina burtoni, blotchside darter
- Percina macrocephala, longhead darter – State-level threatened status

=== Crustacean ===
The Alabama crayfish, Orconectes alabamensis is a rare crayfish species found near the Buffalo.

=== Mussels ===
Three species of mussels are among the rare species listed by TDEC. Both the Cracking Pearly Mussel and the Pale Lilliput are listed by both State and Federal authorities as Endangered.

- Hemistena lata, Cracking Pearly Mussel
- Quadrilla cylindrical cylindrical, Rabbitsfoot
- Toxolasma cylindrellus, Pale Lilliput

=== Snails ===
Four species of rare snails are found near the Buffalo; none of them are included by TDEC on species concerns lists.

- Leptoxis praerosa, Onyx Rocksnail
- Lithasia duttoniana, Helmet Rocksnail
- Lithasia geniculata fuliginosa, Geniculate Rocksnail
- Lithasia geniculata fulginosa, Geniculate Riversnail

== Geology ==
Except for a very small section on the southern end, the watershed is part of the Western Highland Rim, one of 25 Level IV subecoregions in the state. The dissected, rolling terrain is characterized by long ridges with steep sides and hollows deeply eroded into those ridges. The river flows in a wide flood plain of "bottom land". The elevation varies from 400 to 1,000 feet (120 to 300 m).

The predominant geology of the area is that of Paleozoic limestones. The Mississippian limestone base along with chert and shale is overlaid by fairly thin soils of moderate fertility. These tend to be acidic. Much of the differential erosion leading to the terrain features results from differences in deposition and mineralization of the various types of limestone in the area and the presence of large portions of chert. Some chert bears small quantities of the iron-containing mineral hematite or other oxides of iron. During the mid-to-late 19th century there was considerable iron-ore related mining and smelting of Limonite ore.

The sizable tributary streams flow out of narrow hollows into the Buffalo; only the largest ones have true stream valleys of their own. Streams are typically clear with a moderate gradient.

== Economy ==
Canoeing float trips significantly contribute to the area's economy. The area's remoteness depresses the local economy compared to that of the state as a whole. The Middle Tennessee Council of the Boy Scouts of America operates Grimes Canoe Base along the Buffalo in southern Perry County. Several businesses provide commercial canoe and float access to the river for tourists. The river is primarily a Class I stream with significant stretches of flat water. Free float tubing is feasible in selected portions of the river. Between 1837 and 1837, the section of the river below Beardstown was briefly legally considered a navigable waterway.

There are three trails associated with the river.

- Buffalo River – Perry County – A scenic water trail through nature – 37.87 miles (60.95 km)
- Ladies Bluff Trail – Perry County – A scenic, hiking, wilderness trail – 2 miles (3.2 km) – Partially ADA compliant
- Linden City Park Walking Trail – Perry County – Health and fitness trail 0.2 miles (320 m) – ADA compliant

=== River access ===
- Metal Ford is accessible from the Natchez Trace Parkway about 3.4 miles (5.5 km) south of Tennessee State Route 20.

== See also ==
- List of rivers of Tennessee
