= Poplar Creek (Tennessee) =

Coordinates: 35.9275765°N 84.4088178°W

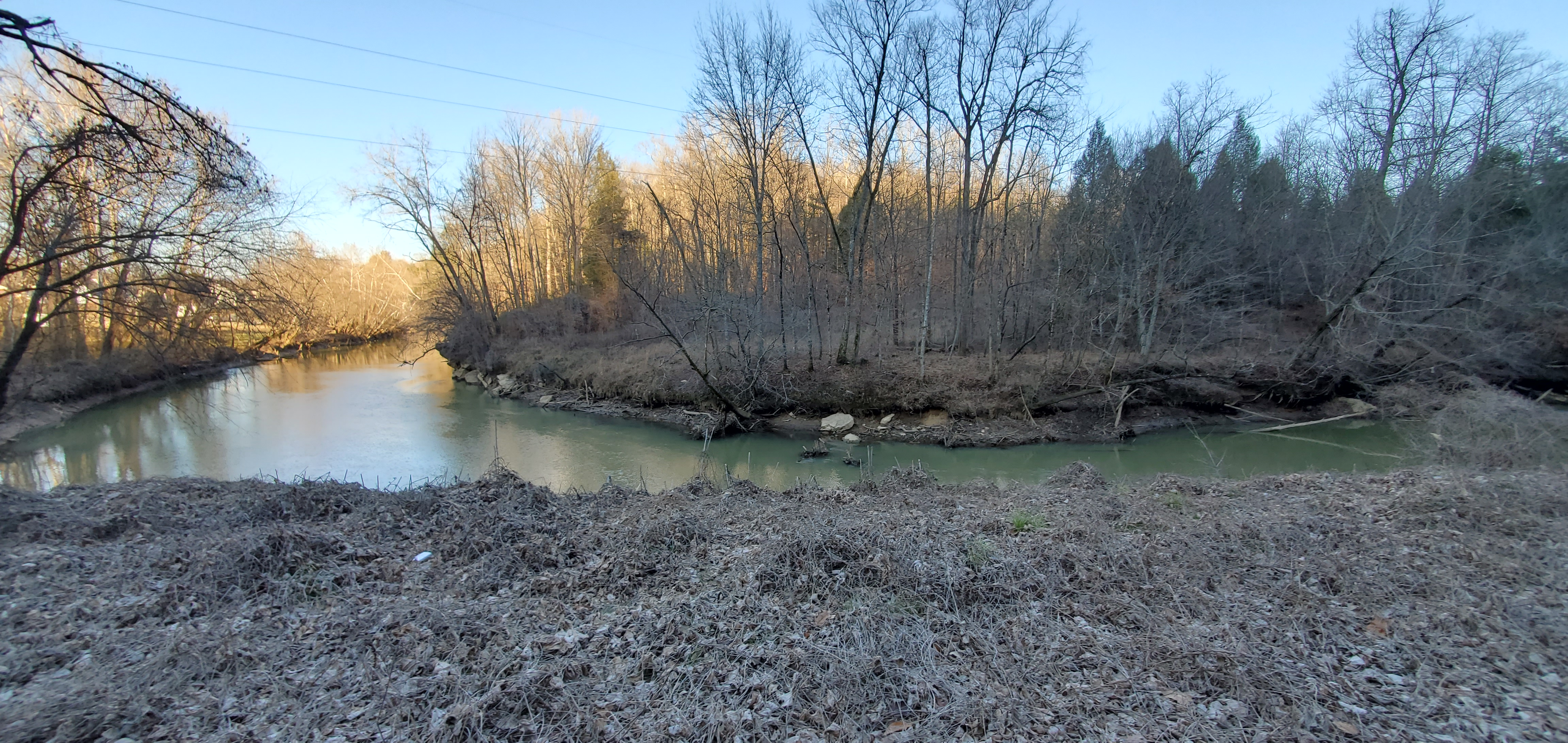

Location
- Country: United States
- State: Tennessee

Physical characteristics
- Source
  - elevation: 820 ft (250 m)
- Mouth
  - location: Clinch River
- Basin size: 82 mi^{2} (210 km^{2})

Poplar Creek is a tributary of the Clinch River in Anderson and Roane counties in East Tennessee. Draining a watershed area of more than 82 square miles (210 km^{2}), it enters the Clinch near the former K-25 site, a short distance downstream from the confluence of East Fork Poplar Creek, its largest tributary.

== See also ==
- List of rivers of Tennessee
