= Duck River (Tennessee) =

River in the United States of America

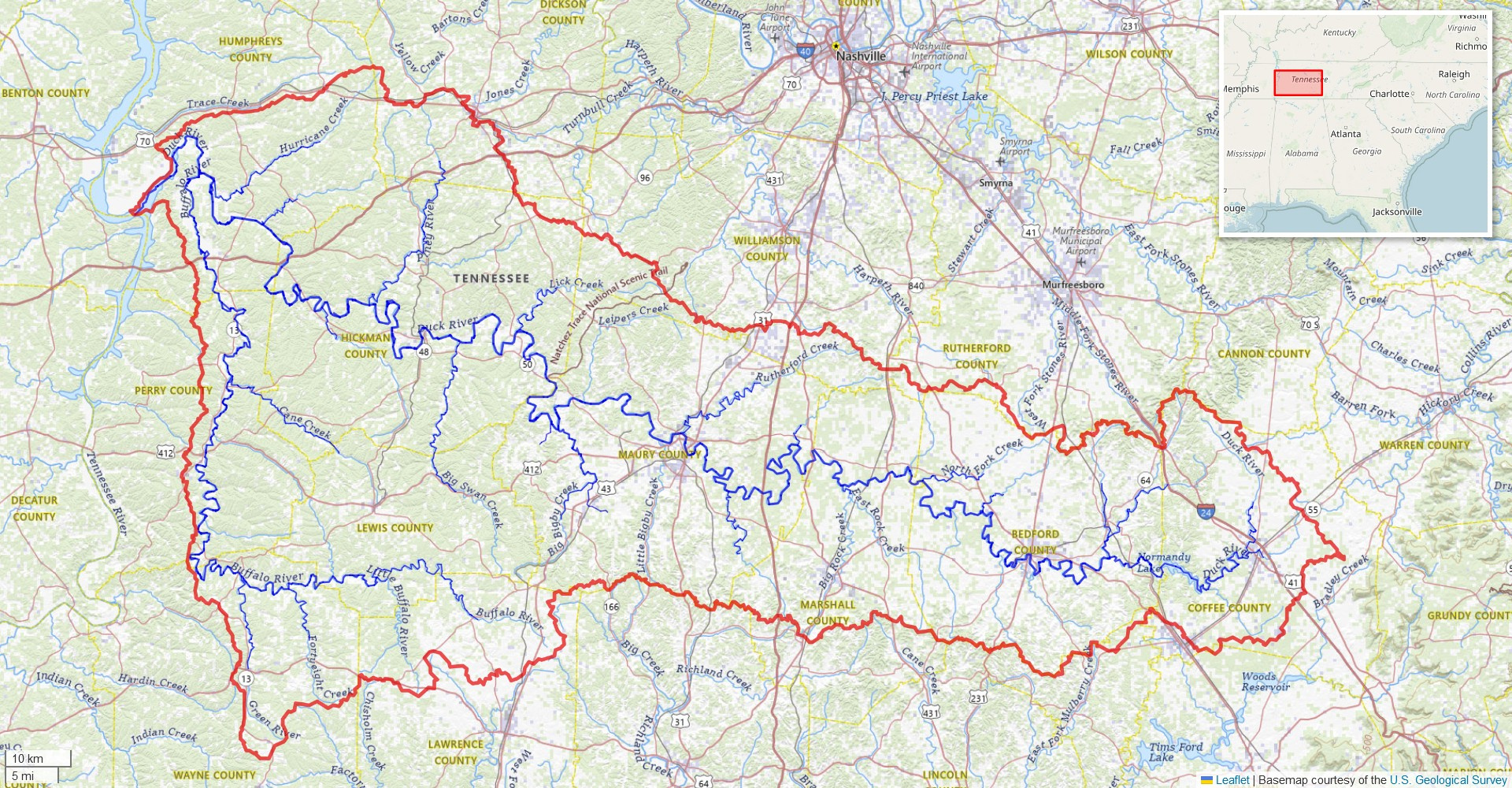
- Duck River watershed (Interactive map)

Physical characteristics
- Source
  - location: 35.668°N 86.167°W
  - elevation: 385 metres (1,263 ft)
- Mouth
  - location: Confluence with the Tennessee River in Kentucky Lake, Humphreys County, TN
  - elevation: 108 metres (354 ft)
- Length: 284 mi (457 km)
- Basin size: 9,040 square kilometres (3,490 sq mi)

Basin features
- River system: Tennessee, Mississippi

The Duck River, 284-mile (457 km) long, is the longest river located entirely within the U.S. state of Tennessee. Free flowing for most of its length, the Duck River is home to over 50 species of freshwater mussels and 151 species of fish, making it the most biologically diverse river in North America.

The Duck River drains a significant portion of Middle Tennessee. It rises in hills near an area of Middle Tennessee known as the "Barrens", an area with enough rainfall to support a woodland but which white settlers found already deforested upon their arrival. (Several theories have been advanced to explain this phenomenon.) It enters the city of Manchester and meets its confluence with a major tributary, the Little Duck River, at Old Stone Fort State Park, named after an ancient Native American structure between the two rivers believed to be nearly 2,000 years old.

Other major towns along the Duck include Shelbyville, Columbia, and Centerville. Below Shelbyville to the Southeast, the Duck is impounded by Normandy Dam, a Tennessee Valley Authority project of the early 1970s which was built for flood control and recreation. Normandy was not equipped for power generation as were previous TVA dams built in Middle Tennessee. The structure was named for the hamlet of Normandy, which is nearby. The resultant reservoir occupies over 5,000 acres (2,000 ha) of what was previously prime land for agriculture. Further downstream, Shelbyville is protected from potential Duck River flooding by levees and floodgates. A dam constructed by the Tennessee Electric Power Company across the river adjacent to downtown Shelbyville is a relic of the early electrical development of the area prior to the establishment of the Tennessee Valley Authority.

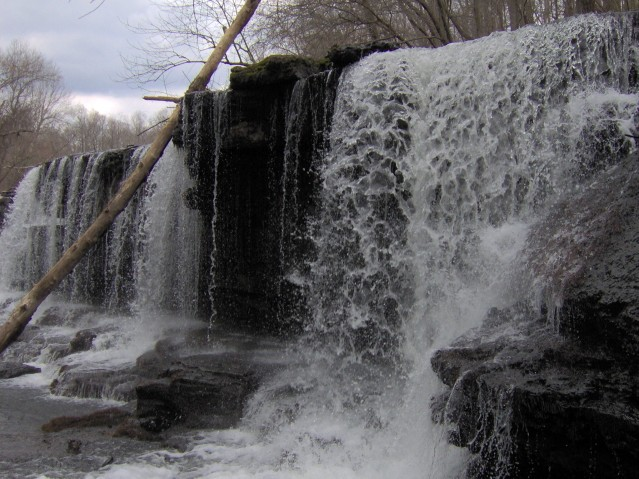
Blue Hole Falls along the Duck River near Manchester

Downstream in Maury County is the Yanahli Wildlife Preserve, occupying land which was meant to be another TVA reservoir. The Columbia Dam was never completed, however, when an endangered species of mussel was found in this section of the Duck and studies showed the project costs would far exceed benefits. After years of litigation, the dam, which was largely completed, was dismantled at a loss approaching $80,000,000 of public funds. Another old Tennessee Electric Power Company dam, somewhat similar to the one in downtown Shelbyville, is located downstream of the uncompleted dam site. Private funds have been spent on this dam to rehabilitate it to resume electrical power production; however, this has not proven to be successful. The Duck River frequently floods parts of Columbia, particularly the neighborhoods near downtown.

Between Columbia and Centerville, the Duck cuts through the Western Highland Rim and is joined by several major tributaries, notably the Piney River. Downtown Centerville is located high above the Duck River bottoms. Below Centerville, the Duck again enters a fairly rural, somewhat remote area. Its largest single tributary, the Buffalo River, reaches its confluence with the Duck in southern Humphreys County, just a few miles from the mouth of the Duck into the Tennessee River. The area of the mouth of the Duck is part of the Tennessee National Wildlife Refuge.

American Rivers named the Duck on their annual list of America's Most Endangered Rivers, citing its biodiversity and the high rate of population growth in Middle Tennessee with little long-term planning. In November 2024, Governor Bill Lee (Tennessee politician) establishing the Duck River Watershed Planning Partnership, a temporary organization to make "watershed management recommendations that balance the needs of water users and economic growth against the need to protect the environmental integrity of the Duck River."

As of late 2025, eight water utilities are seeking to increase their withdrawal of water from the river, and one of those utilities, Columbia Power & Water Systems, has gone so far as to propose a rate hike to fund new infrastructure on the river with an increased water intake capacity.

== Tributaries ==
- Panther Branch
- Wartrace Creek

== See also ==
- List of rivers of Tennessee
- Duck River Valley Narrow Gauge Railway
