= National Register of Historic Places listings in Hickman County, Tennessee =

Location of Hickman County in Tennessee

This is a list of the National Register of Historic Places listings in Hickman County, Tennessee.

This is intended to be a complete list of the properties and districts on the National Register of Historic Places in Hickman County, Tennessee, United States. Latitude and longitude coordinates are provided for many National Register properties and districts; these locations may be seen together in a map.

There are 11 properties and districts listed on the National Register in the county.

Contents: Counties in Tennessee
Anderson – Bedford – Benton – Bledsoe – Blount – Bradley – Campbell – Cannon – Carroll – Carter – Cheatham – Chester – Claiborne – Clay – Cocke – Coffee – Crockett – Cumberland – Davidson – Decatur – DeKalb – Dickson – Dyer – Fayette – Fentress – Franklin – Gibson – Giles – Grainger – Greene – Grundy – Hamblen – Hamilton – Hancock – Hardeman – Hardin – Hawkins – Haywood – Henderson – Henry – Hickman – Houston – Humphreys – Jackson – Jefferson – Johnson – Knox – Lake – Lauderdale – Lawrence – Lewis – Lincoln – Loudon – Macon – Madison – Marion – Marshall – Maury – McMinn – McNairy – Meigs – Monroe – Montgomery – Moore – Morgan – Obion – Overton – Perry – Pickett – Polk – Putnam – Rhea – Roane – Robertson – Rutherford – Scott – Sequatchie – Sevier – Shelby – Smith – Stewart – Sullivan – Sumner – Tipton – Trousdale – Unicoi – Union – Van Buren – Warren – Washington – Wayne – Weakley – White – Williamson – Wilson

This National Park Service list is complete through NPS recent listings posted March 27, 2026.

== Current listings ==
	Name on the Register	Image	Date listed	Location	City or town	Description
1	Bon Aqua Springs Historic District		February 23, 1990 (#90000303)	Old State Route 46, southeast of Bon Aqua; 35°56′46″N 87°19′02″W	Bon Aqua	
2	John Gordon House	John Gordon House	April 18, 1974 (#74000333)	Northwest of Williamsport off State Route 50; 35°43′11″N 87°15′38″W	Williamsport	
3	Lee and Gould Furnace (40HI125)		April 9, 1988 (#88000248)	Address Restricted; 35°53′39″N 87°38′20″W	Bucksnort	
4	New Aetna Furnace Historic District (40HI149)		June 13, 1988 (#88000246)	Address Restricted	Aetna	
5	Oakland Furnace and Forge (40HI146)		April 9, 1988 (#88000261)	Address Restricted	Texas Hollow	
6	Old Aetna Furnace (40HI148)		April 9, 1988 (#88000247)	Address Restricted	Aetna	
7	Old Natchez Trace		May 30, 1975 (#75002125)	From the Alabama/Tennessee border to U.S. Route 100 in Davidson County	Chapel Hill	Extends into Davidson, Lawrence, Lewis, Maury, Wayne, and Williamson counties
8	Primm Springs Historic District		July 5, 1985 (#85001480)	Irregular pattern along the Puppy Branch of Dog Creek between House and Baker Rds. and Mineral Springs; 35°49′24″N 87°15′01″W	Primm Springs	
9	Shelby Bend Archeological District		February 1, 1990 (#89001760)	Address Restricted	Greenfield Bend	Extends into Maury County
10	Standard Furnace (40HI145)		April 9, 1988 (#88000243)	Address Restricted	Nunnelly	
11	James Buchanan Walker House	James Buchanan Walker House	March 2, 1989 (#89000146)	West End and S. Barnwell Aves. 35°46′44″N 87°28′13″W	Centerville	

== Former listings ==
Two other properties were once listed, but have since been removed:

	Name on the Register	Image	Date listed	Date removed	Location	City or town	Description
1	Fairview School		December 8, 1983 (#83004252)	March 10, 2009	113 E. Hackberry St. 35°46′47″N 87°27′49″W	Centerville	
2	Pinewood		May 6, 1971 (#71001072)	June 2, 1975	Pinewood Rd., Rt. #3	Nunnelly	Destroyed by fire on March 15, 1975

== See also ==
- List of National Historic Landmarks in Tennessee
- National Register of Historic Places listings in Tennessee
