= Tennessee State Route 230 =

State highway in Tennessee, United States

State Route 230
- SR 230 highlighted in red

Route information
- Maintained by TDOT
- Length: 34.54 mi (55.59 km)
- Existed: July 1, 1983–present

Major junctions
- West end: SR 13 near Waverly
- I-40 near Bucksnort
- East end: SR 50 near Littlelot

Location
- Country: United States
- State: Tennessee
- Counties: Humphreys, Hickman

Highway system
- Tennessee State Routes; Interstate; US; State
← SR 229	→ US 231

State Route 230 (SR 230) is a secondary state highway located in Humphreys County and Hickman County in Middle Tennessee. It consists largely of former county highways that were designated as a state route in order to ensure adequate ongoing maintenance funding.

== Route description ==
SR 230 runs from its western terminus at SR 13 in Humphreys County south of Waverly roughly southeast to the rural community of Bold Spring. This portion of the highway is known as Bold Spring Road. From Bold Spring, the highway runs roughly south until it enters Hickman County; it crosses I-40 shortly thereafter. From this point it trends largely east, passing through the rural community of Spot and the former Hickman County seat, Vernon. Meeting SR 48 at the community of Nunnelly, it is overlain by 48 until the junction with SR 100 junction in eastern Centerville. From there it is overlain by SR 100 until just west of Lyles where it splits from SR 100, again running south and through the small community of Littlelot. This portion of the highway is known as Littlelot Road. Just south of Littlelot is the eastern terminus along SR 50.

== Major intersections ==
County	Location	mi	km	Destinations	Notes
Humphreys				SR 13 – Waverly, Hurricane Mills, Lobelville	Western terminus
Hickman				I-40 – Memphis, Nashville	I-40 exit 152
Hickman	Nunnelly			SR 48 north – Dickson	Northern end of SR 48 concuurency
Hickman	Centerville			SR 48 south / SR 100 west – Downtown, Hohenwald, Linden	Southern end of SR 48 concurrency; Western end of SR 100 concurrency
Hickman				SR 100 east – Wrigley, Lyles, Bon Aqua	Western end of SR 100 concurrency
Hickman				SR 50 – Centerville, Williamsport, Columbia	Eastern terminus
1.000 mi = 1.609 km; 1.000 km = 0.621 mi: Concurrency terminus

== See also ==
- List of Tennessee state highways
