= Tennessee State Route 50 =

State highway in Tennessee, United States

State Route 50
- SR 50; primary in red, secondary in blue, unsigned in green

Route information
- Maintained by TDOT
- Length: 161.3 mi (259.6 km)
- Existed: October 1, 1923–present

Major junctions
- West end: I-40 near Only
- US 43 / US 412 in Columbia; US 412 Bus. in Columbia; US 31 in Columbia; I-65 near Lewisburg; US 431 in Lewisburg; US 64 in Fayetteville; US 231 in Fayetteville; US 64 Bus. / SR 16 in Winchester; US 41A / SR 15 in Winchester; I-24 / US 64 near Monteagle; US 41 near Monteagle
- East end: SR 56 / SR 108 in Altamont

Location
- Country: United States
- State: Tennessee
- Counties: Hickman, Maury, Marshall, Lincoln, Moore, Franklin, Coffee, Grundy

Highway system
- Tennessee State Routes; Interstate; US; State
| ← SR 49 | → US 51 |

State Route 50 (SR 50) is a west–to–east highway in Middle Tennessee. The road begins near Only and ends in Altamont. The current length is 161.3 miles (259.6 km).

== Route description ==
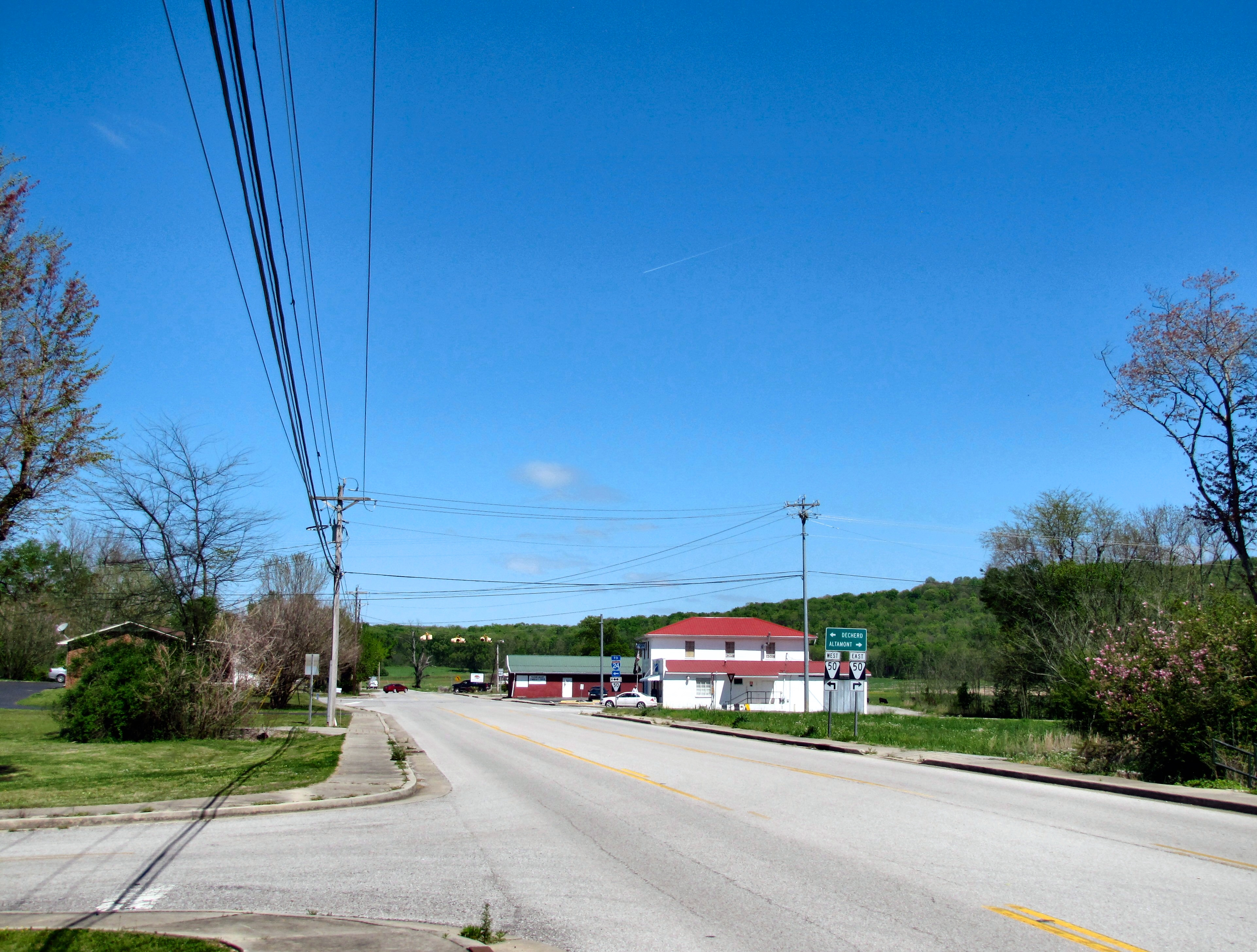
Looking toward the intersection of U.S. Route 41 and Tennessee State Route 50 in the Pelham community of Grundy County

=== Hickman County ===
SR 50 begins as a two-lane secondary highway in Hickman County at exit 148 on I-40 near Only as a continuation of Duck River Road. SR 50 travels southeast and crosses a bridge over the Duck River to enter Only and have an intersection with Dyer Road, which follows SR 50's former alignment through the community. SR 50 then passes through wooded areas as it bypasses Only to the south before having an intersection with SR 229, which provides access to the Turney Center Industrial Complex. SR 50 continues east to cross the Duck River again before paralleling it and having an intersection with SR 438. The highway then has two more crossings of the Duck river before passing near Grinder's Switch and entering Centerville. SR 50 then passes south of downtown as it then comes to an intersection with SR 48 and SR 100, where it becomes a primary highway as it turns south to have a short concurrency with them before leaving Centerville and continuing east, still paralleling the Duck River. for a short distance. The highway then passes south of Littlelot, where it has an intersection with SR 230 shortly before another bridge over the Duck River, an interchange with the Natchez Trace Parkway, and crossing into Maury County.

=== Maury County ===
SR 50 becomes Williamsport Pike as it turns southeast and has an intersection with SR 247 shortly before crossing another bridge over the Duck River and passing through Williamsport. The highway then continues through farmland to come to an interchange with US 43/US 412/SR 6 and entering Columbia.

SR 50 roughly parallels the Duck River from the highway's beginning to Columbia; the highway crosses the river six separate times along this stretch.

SR 50 enters Columbia from the northwest and has a short concurrency with US 412 Bus/SR 99 (Hampshire Pike) before bypassing downtown to the south along James Campbell Boulevard, where it becomes a four-lane divided highway and has an intersection with SR 243 (Trotwood Avenue). SR 50 then passes a major business district, where it has an intersection with SR 245 (Highland Avenue) before having an intersection with US 31/SR 7 (Carmack Boulevard). SR 50 then narrows to two lanes and has an intersection with Tom J Hitch Parkway before turning southeast and leaving Columbia, becoming New Lewisburg Highway. The highway now passes through farmland and has an intersection with SR 373 in the Glendale community before having an interchange with I-65 at exit 37, shortly before crossing into Marshall County. In places it follows the route of the former Duck River Valley Narrow Gauge Railway.

=== Marshall County ===
SR 50 becomes New Columbia Highway and continues southeast to enter Lewisburg at an intersection where it becomes concurrent with US 431/SR 106. The highway then becomes N Ellington Parkway as it has an intersection with SR 417 just before splitting off from US 431/SR 106 onto Franklin Avenue to enter downtown. SR 50 then comes to an intersection and becomes concurrent with US 31A Bus/US 431 Bus (N 2nd Avenue).

From here to Fayetteville, SR 50 is unsigned.

They then go south through downtown before SR 50 and US 431 Bus split off from US 31A Bus and go east at another intersection with SR 373. They then leave downtown and come to an intersection with US 31A/US 431/SR 11/SR 106/SR 272 (N/S Ellington Parkway), where US 431 Bus and SR 106 end and SR 50 becomes concurrent with US 431. They then become E Commerce Street before leaving Lewisburg and going southeast as Fayetteville Highway. The highway then passes through Belfast, where it has an intersection with SR 271, before continuing southeast through farmland to Petersburg, where it goes through town on Buchanan Street as it has a short concurrency with SR 129 and has an intersection with both SR 130 and SR 244 before leaving Petersburg and crossing into Lincoln County.

=== Lincoln County ===
US 431/SR 50 becomes Lewisburg Highway as it continues southeast through farmland to enter Fayetteville on the north side of town. It then passes through some neighborhoods as Bright Avenue before entering downtown Main Avenue N, where they come to an intersection with US 64/SR 15 (College Street E), where SR 50 splits from US 431 to follow US 64/SR 15 east. Turning northeast, it becomes Mulberry Avenue as it leaves downtown and comes to an intersection with US 64 Bypass and US 231/SR 10, where it becomes Winchester Highway. They then widen to an undivided four-lane highway and leave Fayetteville. On the eastern edge of town, SR 50 breaks away from US 64/SR 15, turns northeast, and becomes Lynchburg Highway.

From here on, SR 50 is signed.

SR 50 passes through the small town of Mulberry before crossing into Moore County.

=== Moore County ===
SR 50 then becomes Fayetteville Highway and passes through several miles of farmland before entering Lynchburg, where it has an intersection with SR 55, turns secondary, and follows Main Street for a short distance before turning onto Winchester Highway and leaving Lynchburg. SR 50 then winds its way through the countryside for the next few miles before crossing a bridge over the Elk River and entering Franklin County, passing just south of Tims Ford Dam.

=== Franklin County ===
SR 50 continues as Lynchburg Road as it makes its way east to Broadview, where it has intersections with SR 121 and SR 476 before crossing an arm of Tims Ford Lake to enter Winchester.

This section of SR 50 between Lynchburg and Winchester is popular with area motorcyclists and sports car drivers due to its sinuousness.

In Winchester, SR 50 makes several turns and has several names (4th Avenue NW, Cedar Street, 2nd Avenue, High Street, where it has another intersection with SR 130, 1st Avenue, and College Street) until it joins US 41A/SR 16 as Dinah Shore Boulevard in downtown. The highway then leaves downtown as it widens to an undivided four-lane highway and crosses a bridge over an arm of Tims Ford Lake and heads northeast out of town. SR 50 then becomes primary as it splits from US 41A/SR 16 as W Main Street to enter and pass through the neighboring town of Decherd as a two-lane. Continuing northeast, SR 50 leaves Decherd and becomes Old Alto Highway and then Warren Chapel Road before rejoining US 64 as Veterans Memorial Drive (four-lane divided highway; via an interchange). It then passes through the community of Alto before crossing into Coffee County.

=== Coffee County ===
US 64 and SR 50 pass through the southeasternmost sliver of Coffee County, where it crosses the Elk River for a second time before crossing into Grundy County.

=== Grundy County ===
US 64 and SR 50 then come to an interchange with I-24 at exit 127, where SR 50 again splits from US 64 and becomes a secondary highway. SR 50 then enters Pelham to intersect US 41/SR 2 before crossing the Elk River for a third time. Continuing northeast, SR 50 becomes curvy as it climbs from the Eastern Highland Rim onto the Cumberland Plateau as Elkhead Road and then Pelham Road. Shortly after reaching the Plateau, it becomes concurrent with SR 108. They then east to enter Altamont where SR 50 meets its eastern terminus at SR 56 in downtown.

== History ==
At one time, SR 50 had an alternate route, designated SR 50A. It has since been renumbered SR 373.

== Junction list ==
| County | Location | mi | km | Destinations | Notes |
|---|---|---|---|---|---|
| Hickman | Only | 0.0 | 0.0 | I-40 – Memphis, Nashville | Western terminus; SR 50 begins as a secondary highway; I-40 exit 148 |
| Hickman | Only | 0.6 | 0.97 | Dyer Road - Only | Former SR 50 through Only |
| Hickman | Only | 2.6 | 4.2 | SR 229 south (R W Moore Memorial Rt Highway) – Turney Center Industrial Complex; Only Road - Only | Northern terminus of SR 229; Only Road is former SR 50 |
| Hickman | | 12.0 | 19.3 | SR 438 west (Beaverdam Valley Road) – Coble, Lobelville | Eastern terminus of SR 438 |
| Hickman | Centerville | 17.7 | 28.5 | SR 48 north / SR 100 east (Linden Road) – Wrigley, Nunnelly | Western end of SR 48/SR 100 concurrency; SR 50 turns primary |
| Hickman | Centerville | 18.4 | 29.6 | SR 48 south / SR 100 west (Linden Road) – Hohenwald, Linden | Eastern end of SR 48/SR 100 concurrency |
| Hickman | | 27.8 | 44.7 | SR 230 west (Littlelot Road) – Littlelot, Lyles | Eastern terminus of SR 230 |
| Hickman | | 31.5 | 50.7 | Natchez Trace Parkway | |
| Maury | Williamsport | 34.6 | 55.7 | SR 247 east (Snow Creek Road) – Santa Fe | Western terminus of SR 247 |
| Maury | Columbia | 43.3 | 69.7 | US 43 / US 412 (SR 6) – Mount Pleasant, Hohenwald | Interchange; provides access to Maury County Airport |
| Maury | Columbia | 44.6 | 71.8 | US 412 Bus. west (Hampshire Pike/SR 99 west) | Western end of US 412 Bus/SR 99 concurrency |
| Maury | Columbia | 45.7 | 73.5 | US 412 Bus. east (Hampshire Pike/SR 99 east) | Eastern end of US 412 Bus/SR 99 concurrency |
| Maury | Columbia | 46.7 | 75.2 | SR 243 (Trotwood Avenue) – Mount Pleasant | Old US 43 |
| Maury | Columbia | 49.1 | 79.0 | SR 245 south (Highland Avenue) – Campbellsville | Northern terminus of SR 245 |
| Maury | Columbia | 49.5 | 79.7 | US 31 (Carmack Boulevard/SR 7) – Pulaski | |
| Maury | Glendale | 54.6 | 87.9 | SR 373 east (Culleoka Highway) – Culleoka | Western terminus of SR 373; former SR 50A |
| Maury | | 59.2 | 95.3 | I-65 – Nashville, Huntsville | I-65 exit 37 |
| Marshall | Lewisburg | 65.3 | 105.1 | US 431 north (SR 106 north) – Franklin | Western end of US 431/SR 106 concurrency; SR 50 becomes unsigned; provides access to Ellington Airport |
| Marshall | Lewisburg | 65.9 | 106.1 | SR 417 south (W Ellington Parkway) | Northern terminus of SR 417 |
| Marshall | Lewisburg | 65.9 | 106.1 | US 431 south (N Ellington Parkway/SR 106 south) | Eastern end of US 431/SR 106 concurrency |
| Marshall | Lewisburg | 67.5 | 108.6 | US 31A Bus. north / US 431 Bus. north (N 2nd Avenue/SR 11 north) | Western end of US 31A Bus./US 431 Bus. concurrency |
| Marshall | Lewisburg | 67.8 | 109.1 | US 31A Bus. south (S 2nd Avenue/SR 11 south) / SR 373 west (W Commerce Street) – Culleoka | Eastern end of US 31A Bus. concurrency; eastern terminus of SR 373; SR 373 is former SR 50A |
| Marshall | Lewisburg | 68.7 | 110.6 | US 31A / US 431 north / SR 272 (N/S Ellington Parkway/SR 106) – Pulaski, Fayetteville, Lynnville | Southern terminus of US 431 Bus. concurrency; western end of US 431 concurrency |
| Marshall | Belfast | 73.1 | 117.6 | SR 271 north – Farmington | Southern terminus of SR 271 |
| Marshall | Petersburg | 79.6 | 128.1 | SR 129 west (Delina Road) – Cornersville | Western end of SR 129 concurrency |
| Marshall | Petersburg | 81.0 | 130.4 | SR 129 east / SR 130 east (Railroad Street) – Lynchburg, Shelbyville | Eastern end of SR 129 concurrency; western terminus of SR 130 |
| Lincoln | Petersburg | 82.2 | 132.3 | SR 244 south (Boonshill Petersburg Road) | Northern terminus of SR 244 |
| Lincoln | Fayetteville | 93.8 | 151.0 | US 64 west (College Street/SR 15 west/SR 273 west) / US 431 south (Main Avenue S/SR 273 east) – Pulaski, Park City | Eastern end of US 431 concurrency; western end of US 64/SR 15 concurrency |
| Lincoln | Fayetteville | 94.8 | 152.6 | US 64 Byp. west / US 231 (Thornton Taylor Parkway/SR 10) – Shelbyville | Eastern terminus of US 64 Bypass |
| Lincoln | Fayetteville | 96.3 | 155.0 | US 64 east (Winchester Highway/SR 15 east) – Huntland, Winchester | Eastern end of US 64/SR 15 concurrency; SR 50 becomes signed |
| Moore | Lynchburg | 107.6 | 173.2 | SR 55 east – Tullahoma | Western terminus of SR 55; SR 50 turns secondary |
| Franklin | Broadview | 121.6 | 195.7 | SR 121 south (6 Mile Board Road) – Elora | Northern terminus of SR 121 |
| Franklin | Broadview | 122.4 | 197.0 | SR 476 north (Mansford Road) – Tullahoma | Southern terminus of SR 476; provides access to Tims Ford Lake |
| Franklin | Winchester | 127.6 | 205.4 | SR 130 north (N High Street) – Tullahoma | Southern terminus of SR 130 |
| Franklin | Winchester | 127.7 | 205.5 | SR 16 south (1st Avenue NW/SR 15 west) | Western end of SR 16/SR 15 concurrency |
| Franklin | Winchester | 127.9 | 205.8 | US 41A south (S College Street/SR 15 east) – Cowan | Western end of US 41A concurrency; eastern end of SR 15 concurrency |
| Franklin | Decherd | 129.6 | 208.6 | US 41A north / SR 16 north (Dinah Shore Boulevard) – Estill Springs | Eastern end of US 41A/SR 16 concurrency; SR 50 turns primary |
| Franklin | Decherd | 133.0 | 214.0 | US 64 west (Veterans Memorial Drive/SR 433 south) – Winchester | Western end of US 64 concurrency; northern terminus of unsigned SR 433 |
| Grundy | | 143.9 | 231.6 | I-24 / US 64 east – Nashville, Chattanooga | I-24 exit 127; eastern end of US 64 concurrency; SR 50 turns secondary |
| Grundy | Pelham | 145.4 | 234.0 | US 41 (Dixie Highway/SR 2) – Manchester, Monteagle | |
| Grundy | | 154.8 | 249.1 | SR 108 east – Gruetli-Laager | Western end of SR 108 concurrency |
| Grundy | Altamont | 161.3 | 259.6 | SR 56 / SR 108 west (Main Street) – Viola, Coalmont, Tracy City | Eastern terminus; eastern end of SR 108 concurrency; SR 50 ends as a secondary highway |
1.000 mi = 1.609 km; 1.000 km = 0.621 mi: Concurrency terminus

== See also ==
- List of state routes in Tennessee
