= Nashville metropolitan area =

Coordinates: 36°09′44″N 86°46′28″W

The Mid-State
- Metropolitan area
- Nashville-Davidson-Murfreesboro-Franklin, TN MSA
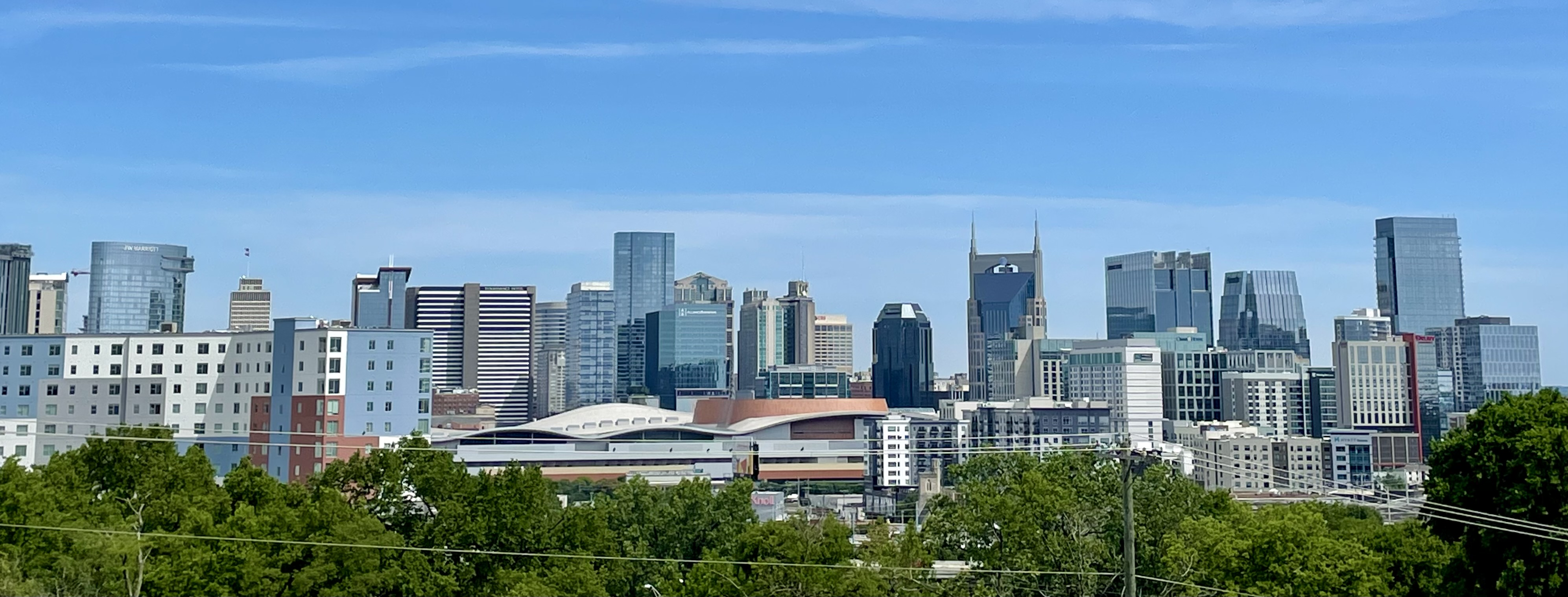
- Nashville skyline

- Nashville-Davidson-Murfreesboro-Franklin Metropolitan Statistical Area
- Country: United States
- State: Tennessee
- Largest city: Nashville
- Principal cities: Murfreesboro; Franklin

Area
  - Total: 7,484 sq mi (19,380 km^{2})
- Highest elevation: 2,093 ft (638 m)

Population (2025)
  - Total: 2,197,416 ▲ (35th)
  - Density: 258/sq mi (100/km^{2})

GDP
  - Total: $204.861 billion (2023)
- Time zone: UTC−6 (Central Time Zone (CST))
  - Summer (DST): UTC−5 (CDT)
- Area codes: 615, 629, 931
- Website: www.visitmusiccity.com

The Nashville metropolitan area (officially the Nashville-Davidson–Murfreesboro–Franklin, TN Metropolitan Statistical Area) is a metropolitan statistical area in north-central Tennessee. Its principal city is Nashville, the capital of and largest city in Tennessee. With a population of over 2 million, it is the most populous metropolitan area in Tennessee. It is also the largest metropolitan area in Tennessee in terms of land area.

The Office of Management and Budget defines the metro area for statistical use by the United States Census Bureau and other agencies. The area is the 35th largest metropolitan area in the United States. The metropolitan statistical area was first designated in 1950 and initially included only Davidson County. As surrounding counties increased in population and densities and in the number of their residents employed in Davidson County, the OMB added new counties to the MSA. Today, the metro area includes Davidson and 13 other counties.

== Geography ==
The Nashville metropolitan area is located in the central part of the state of Tennessee, entirely within the Grand Division of Middle Tennessee, as defined by state law. Both the geographical center and population center of Tennessee are found in Murfreesboro, the second-largest city in the metropolitan area. Geologically, the metropolitan area covers most of the Nashville Basin, a geological dome. Parts of the region extend onto the Highland Rim, an elevated plain which completely surrounds the Nashville Basin. Both of these physiographic provinces are part of the Interior Low Plateaus of the Interior Plains. The highest point in the metropolitan area is Cannon County's Short Mountain, a monadnock that is an outlier of the Cumberland Plateau. The region is characterized by a combination of uneven rolling hills and relatively flat plains, and is underlain with porous sedimentary bedrock such as limestone, sandstone, and shale, which form karst. As a result, the region contains many caves, underground streams, and depressions, and sinkholes are a common problem in the region. There are many abandoned tunnels in Nashville.

Nashville is located in the northwestern corner of the basin, and most of Nashville's suburban growth has occurred to the south, southeast, east, and northeast of the city, due to the more level terrain of the basin. Much of the metro area contains extremely fertile soils, and crops such as corn and tobacco are commonly grown in the more rural parts of the metropolitan area. The Cumberland River passes through central part of the region, and is served by several tributaries, including the Stones, Harpeth, Caney Fork, and Red rivers. A small portion of the southern part of the metropolitan area, including most of Maury County, is within the drainage basin of the Tennessee River. A small part of the northern part of the region is within the Green River watershed. The Nashville metropolitan area is one of the most biodiverse inland regions in the United States, and is home to extremely rare ecosystems known as cedar glades, which are found in areas with shallow limestone bedrock that is largely barren of overlying soil, and are also one of the most endangered ecosystems in the nation, due to the rapid growth of the region.

== Metropolitan area cities and towns ==
Historical population
| Census | Pop. | Note | %± |
|---|---|---|---|
| 1950 | 584,367 | | — |
| 1960 | 676,251 | | 15.7% |
| 1970 | 780,966 | | 15.5% |
| 1980 | 948,606 | | 21.5% |
| 1990 | 1,086,274 | | 14.5% |
| 2000 | 1,358,992 | | 25.1% |
| 2010 | 1,646,200 | | 21.1% |
| 2020 | 2,014,444 | | 22.4% |
| 2025 (est.) | 2,197,416 | | 9.1% |
▲ (35th)

=== Places with over 500,000 inhabitants ===
- Nashville (principal city)

=== Places with over 100,000 inhabitants ===
- Murfreesboro (principal city)

=== Places with 10,000 to 100,000 inhabitants ===
- Brentwood
- Bellevue
- Columbia
- Dickson
- Franklin (principal city)
- Gallatin
- Goodlettsville
- Hartsville
- Hendersonville
- Nolensville
- La Vergne
- Lebanon
- Mount Juliet
- Portland
- Smyrna (principal town)
- Spring Hill
- Springfield
- White House

=== Places with 1,000 to 10,000 inhabitants ===
- Ashland City
- Belle Meade
- Berry Hill
- Bon Aqua Junction
- Burns
- Carthage
- Centerville
- Charlotte
- Christiana (CDP)
- Coopertown
- Cross Plains
- Fairview
- Forest Hills
- Gordonsville
- Greenbrier
- Green Hill (CDP)
- Kingston Springs
- Lafayette
- Millersville
- Mount Pleasant
- Oak Hill
- Pegram
- Pleasant View
- Red Boiling Springs
- Ridgetop
- Rockvale (CDP)
- Rural Hill (CDP)
- South Carthage
- Thompson's Station
- Watertown
- Westmoreland
- White Bluff
- Woodbury

=== Places with fewer than 1,000 inhabitants ===
- Adams
- Auburntown
- Bethpage (CDP)
- Cedar Hill
- Eagleville
- Mitchellville
- Orlinda
- Slayden
- Vanleer
- Walterhill (CDP)

=== Counties ===
| County | Seat | 2025 estimate | 2020 Census | Change | Area | Density |
|---|---|---|---|---|---|---|
| Davidson | Nashville | 745,904 | 715,884 | +4.19% | 526 sq mi (1,360 km^{2}) | 1,418/sq mi (548/km^{2}) |
| Rutherford | Murfreesboro | 386,352 | 341,486 | +13.14% | 624 sq mi (1,620 km^{2}) | 619/sq mi (239/km^{2}) |
| Williamson | Franklin | 272,061 | 247,726 | +9.82% | 584 sq mi (1,510 km^{2}) | 466/sq mi (180/km^{2}) |
| Sumner | Gallatin | 215,538 | 196,281 | +9.81% | 543 sq mi (1,410 km^{2}) | 397/sq mi (153/km^{2}) |
| Wilson | Lebanon | 175,033 | 147,737 | +18.48% | 583 sq mi (1,510 km^{2}) | 300/sq mi (116/km^{2}) |
| Maury | Columbia | 118,131 | 100,974 | +16.99% | 616 sq mi (1,600 km^{2}) | 192/sq mi (74/km^{2}) |
| Robertson | Springfield | 80,175 | 72,803 | +10.13% | 476 sq mi (1,230 km^{2}) | 168/sq mi (65/km^{2}) |
| Dickson | Charlotte | 58,662 | 54,315 | +8.00% | 491 sq mi (1,270 km^{2}) | 119/sq mi (46/km^{2}) |
| Cheatham | Ashland City | 42,778 | 41,072 | +4.15% | 307 sq mi (800 km^{2}) | 139/sq mi (54/km^{2}) |
| Macon | Lafayette | 27,663 | 25,216 | +9.70% | 307 sq mi (800 km^{2}) | 90/sq mi (35/km^{2}) |
| Hickman | Centerville | 26,219 | 24,925 | +5.19% | 613 sq mi (1,590 km^{2}) | 43/sq mi (17/km^{2}) |
| Smith | Carthage | 20,981 | 19,904 | +5.41% | 325 sq mi (840 km^{2}) | 65/sq mi (25/km^{2}) |
| Cannon | Woodbury | 15,296 | 14,506 | +5.45% | 266 sq mi (690 km^{2}) | 58/sq mi (22/km^{2}) |
| Trousdale | Hartsville | 12,623 | 11,615 | +8.68% | 117 sq mi (300 km^{2}) | 108/sq mi (42/km^{2}) |
| Total | | 2,197,416 | 2,014,444 | +9.08% | 6,378 sq mi (16,520 km^{2}) | 345/sq mi (133/km^{2}) |

Hickman County was removed in 2018, but was restored in 2023.

== Combined statistical area ==
The Nashville-Davidson–Murfreesboro, TN, Combined Statistical Area (CSA) is the result of the addition of the Micropolitan Statistical Areas of Shelbyville (Bedford County), Lawrenceburg (Lawrence County) and Lewisburg (Marshall County) to the Nashville-Davidson–Murfreesboro–Franklin, TN, Metropolitan Statistical Area. The population of the CSA as of the 2020 United States census was 2,143,158.

== Politics ==
Politically, the Nashville metropolitan area leans Republican compared to many other large metropolitan regions in the United States. Although Davidson County, which contains the city of Nashville, is a Democratic stronghold and has trended increasingly blue in recent election cycles, it is significantly outvoted by the surrounding suburban and exurban counties, which are overwhelmingly Republican.

Counties surrounding Davidson such as Williamson, Rutherford, Wilson, and Sumner have consistently voted Republican in both state and federal elections. Williamson County, one of the wealthiest in Tennessee, is particularly strong in its Republican support. While there have been modest Democratic gains in certain precincts, the GOP maintains a wide advantage in overall turnout and margins in the suburbs.

2024 Presidential Election in Nashville Metro Area

Nashville Metro Presidential election results
| Year | Republican | Democratic | Third parties |
|---|---|---|---|
| 2024 | 57.97% 542,365 | 40.48% 378,720 | 1.55% 14,505 |
| 2020 | 54.26% 500,933 | 43.48% 401,381 | 2.26% 20,818 |
| 2016 | 55.34% 398,111 | 39.07% 281,061 | 5.58% 40,171 |

=== Government ===
The Nashville metropolitan area spans multiple counties and includes a mix of incorporated municipalities and unincorporated areas. The core of the region (Nashville) is governed by Davidson County, which operates under a consolidated city–county government with the City of Nashville. Surrounding counties—including Williamson, Rutherford, Wilson, and Sumner—also contribute significantly to the metro population. Incorporated municipalities across the area each have their own local government, whether designated as a city, town, or village. Large portions of land within the metro area remain unincorporated and are administered directly by their respective county governments.

=== Congressional districts ===
The Nashville metropolitan area contains all or part of four Congressional districts: the 4th, 5th, 6th, 7th districts. As of 2025 (the 119th Congress), the Cook Partisan Voting Index listed the four as being Republican-leaning, with the 5th district being the most competitive.

In 2022, Tennessee's Legislature passed a new map for Tennessee's congressional districts to account for the new 2020 census data. The Republican Party had total control of the Tennessee government at the time, giving it full control of the redistricting process. The new map that was passed gerrymandered Davidson County into three congressional districts, resulting in Republicans winning them all in 2022.

== Transportation ==
Three major interstate highways serve the Nashville metropolitan area, converging in downtown Nashville as a contiguous freeway loop. Most of the rapid growth of the Nashville metropolitan area has occurred along three major interstate highway corridors. Interstate 40 runs in an east-to-west direction, and connecting the region to Memphis to the west and Knoxville to the east. Interstate 65 runs north to south, and connects to Huntsville, Alabama to the south and Louisville, Kentucky to the north. Interstate 24, while technically an east-west interstate, runs in a northwest-to-southeast orientation, connecting the region to Clarksville to the northwest and Chattanooga to the southeast. Within the metro area, I-40 serves a suburban corridor that consists of the eastern neighborhoods of Nashville, including Donelson and Hermitage, and the cities of Mount Juliet and Lebanon. I-24 serves the suburban areas of Antioch, La Vergne, Smyrna, and Murfreesboro to the southeast, which is both the most populated and, in general, is the most congested corridor in the region. The I-65 corridor to the south consists of the suburban cities of Oak Hill, Berry Hill, Brentwood, and Franklin, and I-65 also serves the Nashville suburbs of Goodlettsville, Hendersonville, and Millersville to the north. Interstate 440 serves as a southern bypass around downtown Nashville, and Interstate 840 is an outer southern bypass around Nashville. State Route 155 (SR 155, Briley Parkway) is a freeway that bypasses downtown Nashville to the north and provides access to a number of tourist attractions including the Grand Ole Opry. SR 386 (Vietnam Veterans Boulevard) is a freeway that serves the suburbs of Hendersonville and Gallatin, and SR 396 connects Spring Hill to I-65.
