= Tennessee State Route 229 =

R W Moore Memorial Rt Highway in Tennessee

State Route 229
- R W Moore Memorial Rt Highway
- SR 229 highlighted in red

Route information
- Maintained by TDOT
- Length: 1.8 mi (2.9 km)
- Existed: July 1, 1983–present

Major junctions
- South end: Turney Center Industrial Complex
- North end: SR 50 in Only

Location
- Country: United States
- State: Tennessee
- Counties: Hickman

Highway system
- Tennessee State Routes; Interstate; US; State
← SR 228	→ SR 230

State Route 229 (SR 229), also known as R W Moore Memorial Rt Highway, is a very short 1.8 miles (2.9 km) long north-south state highway in Hickman County, Tennessee. It is the only access road in and out of Turney Center Industrial Complex, a state prison. SR 229 is a very curvy and rural two-lane highway for its entire length, and it parallels the Duck River for the majority of its length.

Some maps, such as Google Maps, show SR 229 continuing north along Only Road and Dyer Road to pass through the community of Only, even though this is not recognized by TDOT as part of SR 229 and is actually a former alignment of SR 50.

== Major intersections ==
The entire route is in Hickman County.

Location	mi	km	Destinations	Notes
	0.0	0.0	Turney Center Industrial Complex main entrance	Southern terminus
Only	1.8	2.9	SR 50 to I-40 – Centerville	Northern terminus
1.000 mi = 1.609 km; 1.000 km = 0.621 mi
