= Bon Aqua =

Bon Aqua may refer to:

- Bon Aqua, Tennessee
- Bon Aqua Junction, Tennessee
- BonAqua, a Coca-Cola Company brand
