= Shady Grove, Hickman County, Tennessee =

- Unincorporated community
- Location within Tennessee Location within the United States
- Coordinates: 35°43′25″N 87°16′43″W
- Country: United States
- State: Tennessee
- County: Hickman
- Elevation: 541 ft (165 m)
- Time zone: UTC-6 (Central (CST))
  - Summer (DST): UTC-5 (CDT)
- ZIP code: 38454
- Area code: 931
- GNIS feature ID: 1301184

Shady Grove (also known as Duck River) is an unincorporated community in Hickman County, Tennessee, United States. Shady Grove is located along Tennessee State Route 50 and the Duck River, 11.25 miles (18.11 km) east-southeast of Centerville.

== History ==
The Duck River post office was located at Shady Grove from December 28, 1846, to March 12, 1977. The community was named for the shade a grove of trees provided the town site.
