= Primm =

Primm may refer to:

== Places in the United States ==
=== Nevada and California ===
- Primm, Nevada, an unincorporated community

=== Tennessee ===
- Primm Springs, Tennessee, an unincorporated community
  - Primm Springs Historic District

=== Texas ===
- Kirtley, Texas, an unincorporated community formerly known as Primm

== People ==
- Beny Primm (1928–2015), American physician
- Gary Primm, American casino developer and former chairman and chief executive of Primm Valley Resorts
- J. P. Primm (born 1989), American basketball player
- Werner Primm (1904–1988), German sculptor

== Media ==
- "Primm" (Hacks), 2nd episode of American comedy-drama TV series Hacks

== Other uses ==
- Owen-Primm House, a historic house in Brentwood, Tennessee
- Primm 300, an off-road race
- Primm Valley Resorts, a group of three hotel-casinos
  - Primm Valley Resort, a hotel and casino
  - Primm Valley Golf Club, part of the resort and located in San Bernardino County, California
