= Indian Camp Hollow =

Valley in Tennessee, United States

Coordinates: 35.986385°N 87.516440°W

Indian Camp Hollow is a valley in Hickman County, Tennessee, in the United States.

Indian Camp Hollow was named from a former Native American camping ground located there.
