= Meriwether Lewis Electric Cooperative =

Utility cooperative in Tennessee

- Company type: Utility cooperative
- Industry: Electric utility
- Founded: 1939
- Headquarters: Centerville, Tennessee, United States
- Area served: Middle Tennessee
- Key people: Keith Carnahan (President and CEO)
- Products: Electricity, Internet service provider
- Net income: $3,190,292
- Total assets: $157,637,371
- Subsidiaries: MLConnect, LLC
- Website: https://www.mlec.com https://www.mlconnect.com (Internet Services)

Meriwether Lewis Electric Cooperative (also known as MLEC) is a non-profit, member owned utility cooperative that provides electric power service and internet services to rural communities in western Middle Tennessee. It is a 501(c)(12) organization, and is headquartered in Centerville, Tennessee. It was established in 1939 under the Tennessee Electric Cooperative Act of 1939, and also holds a government-granted monopoly on electric power distribution within its service area, which includes Hickman, Houston, Humphreys, Lewis, and Perry counties. It is named after American explorer Meriwether Lewis, who is buried in its service area. MLEC is a part of the Touchstone Energy cooperative federation.

== History ==
In June 1939, MLEC was organized by representatives from Hickman, Humphreys, Lewis, and Perry counties in the Hickman County Courthouse in Centerville, Tennessee. MLEC has its origins in a New Deal program aimed at the transfer of the Tennessee Electric Power Company (TEPCO), a subsidiary of the Commonwealth & Southern Corporation, to public ownership. In August 1939, the Federal Government purchased TEPCO for $78,425,095, marking the largest single transfer of a utility from private to public ownership, and made Tennessee the first state in the country with state-wide publicly-owned power. The purchase was criticized by Commonwealth & Southern's president, Wendell Willkie, who claimed the company had been forced to sell because it was unable to compete with government funded competition. The cooperative was officially incorporated that same month, when TEPCO's holdings in the MLEC associated counties were transferred to the cooperative. Houston County was added to the service area shortly afterwards. The TEPCO transfer in included 132 miles (212 km) of electric power lines in the MLEC service area, and by 1949 it had built 741 miles (1,193 km) of power lines. In 1965, MLEC's manager, Paul Tidwell, was elected president of the National Rural Electric Cooperative Association following his high-profile advocacy and congressional testimony in favor of rural electrification. By 1994, it had expanded its network to over 3,000 miles (4,800 km) of power lines. Most funding for the early expansion of the cooperative's power network was supplied by the Rural Electrification Administration in the form of low-interest loans.

The cooperative's operations were significantly impacted by the 2021 Tennessee floods. MLEC's largest service facility and storage yard was located alongside a creek that flooded in Waverly, Tennessee. During the flood, all vehicles in the yard were either damaged or destroyed, as was 20 percent of the infrastructure materials located in the yard. Operations were shifted to its four remaining operational service centers, and electricity had been restored to most hospitals and shelters in the affected area within 48 hours with the assistance of neighboring utilities that were less severely impacted.

== Services ==
=== Electricity ===
MLEC does not operate electric generation facilities, but rather purchases electric power for distribution from the Tennessee Valley Authority (TVA), and is a de jure monopoly within its service area. In 2003, MLEC issued a required five-year notice to the TVA that it was exploring alternative power suppliers and could cease power purchases from the Authority. MLEC rescinded its cancellation notice in 2004, instead opting to remain with the TVA as its sole power supplier. In 2019, MLEC was the recipient of a $60 million USDA loan to begin construction of smart grid applications within its service area.

=== Internet ===
In August 2018, MLEC began construction of rural gigabit broadband internet infrastructure, becoming an Internet service provider operating under the brand name MLConnect. In 2019 it connected its first customer and construction was completed in its five county service area in 2022. The infrastructure improvements were partially funded by government grants from the Tennessee Department of Economic and Community Development, which were established in response to a 2019 report from the Federal Communications Commission that highlighted the lack of rural broadband internet access in the state. In 2020, MLEC began a program named 'My MLEC Wifi' to implement free community wireless internet in numerous public parks and spaces within its service areas.

== Aid and advocacy ==
In 1964, MLEC leadership took part in a USAID and NRECA sponsored program in which American rural electric experts advised developing countries in establishing rural electrification. As a part of this program, MLEC was tapped to provide assistance to Peru. In addition to participating in international rural electrification programs, MLEC has taken part in lobbying efforts and congressional testimony to maintain government support of the TVA.

MLEC provides numerous grants and loan programs supporting local government and small businesses in its service area. In 1991, MLEC created the Adopt-A-School Grant program with the goal of creating matching grants from local businesses to support educators and schools through monetary contributions towards items such as books, classroom equipment, and academic intervention programs. MLEC has operated a revolving loan fund since 1996. Through this program, MLEC provides no interest loans to small business operating in their service area. Additionally, MLEC services pass-through loans from Federal agencies to rural businesses designed to assist in rural employment. As with many electric power organizations, MLEC provides personnel and equipment to disaster relief efforts resulting in widescale power outages, such as hurricanes. During the COVID-19 pandemic, MLEC and the TVA issued multiple grants in the service area focused on aid to non-profits and local government efforts to address nutrition, health, and education concerns.

== See also ==
- Tennessee Valley Authority
