= 1995 Richland High School shooting =

1995 criminal attack in Tennessee, US

Coordinates: 35.3371°N 87.0319°W

- Location: Lynnville, Tennessee, United States
- Date: November 15, 1995 (CST)
- Attack type: School shooting, double-murder
- Weapon: .22-caliber Remington Model 522 Viper semi-automatic rifle
- Deaths: 2
- Injuries: 1
- Perpetrator: James Ellison Rouse
- Motive: Revenge for poor grades
- Verdict: Guilty on all counts
- Convictions: Rouse: First-degree murder; Second-degree murder; Attempted first-degree murder; Abbott: Criminal responsibility (4 counts)
- Sentence: Rouse: Life imprisonment without the possibility of parole, plus 42 years Abbott: 40 years imprisonment; commuted to 27 years imprisonment
- Convicted: Rouse, Stephen Abbott

The Richland High School shooting was a school shooting that occurred on Wednesday, November 15, 1995, in Lynnville, Tennessee, a small community located in Giles County. Seventeen-year-old James Ellison "Jamie" Rouse, a senior student at the school, murdered one teacher and one student, and seriously wounded another teacher.

== Perpetrator ==
Jamie Rouse
- Born: James Ellison Rouse; August 5, 1978 (age 48); U.S.
- Status: Incarcerated
- Convictions: First degree murder (2 counts), Attempted murder (2 counts)
- Penalty: Life without parole

Details
- Imprisoned at: Turney Center Industrial Complex

James "Jamie" Ellison Rouse was born on 8/5/1978. During his junior year in 1995, he held his brother Jeremy at gunpoint, as punishment for the threat, the boys parents took away Jamie's gun, though he later obtained the rifle used in the subsequent school crime. For his senior year yearbook entry, Jamie wrote a threatening reference leaving his bad memories to his two younger brothers. He also got in a fight with two students in spring 1995 during which he kept threatening to kill the boys, Rouse was suspended for three days for the fight.

== Shooting ==
Rouse used a .22-calibre Remington Viper semi-automatic rifle, which he hid behind bushes before driving to retrieve his friend. His friend Stephen Abbot drove Jamie Rouse the rest of the way to Richland High School. He parked the car outside the school, and Rouse entered through the north entrance hallway. Inside the hallway he confronted teachers Carolyn Yancey and Carolyn Foster.

He then shot both teachers in the head in the view of over fifty students in the hallway. He then aimed his rifle at football coach Ron Shirey; however, he missed and fatally shot freshman Diane Collins in the throat. He was then tackled by a male student and an agriculture teacher, who forcibly took the rifle away from him. Carolyn Foster was killed by a gunshot wound to the head, while Carolyn Yancey survived in serious condition.

== Trial ==
Rouse was convicted as an adult of one count of first-degree murder, one count of second-degree murder, and one count of first-degree attempted murder. He was sentenced to life in prison without the possibility of parole plus 42 years. Stephen Abbott was convicted of criminal responsibility for second degree murder and criminal response for attempted first and second degree murder as a judge decided Abbott knew what Jamie Rouse was planning because Rouse had told him, "It's going to happen today." Abbott was sentenced to 40 years in prison. Abbott's sentence was later reduced to 27 years, and he was released from prison on January 26, 2014.

== Aftermath ==
On December 4, 1995, Rouse's 14-year-old brother Jeremy was arrested and charged with solicitation to commit first-degree murder for trying to get other students to finish the shooting.

Rouse is currently imprisoned in the Turney Center Industrial Complex. As of January 2016, he was up for resentencing due to the Supreme Court cases Miller v. Alabama and Montgomery v. Louisiana, which have banned juvenile offenders from getting a mandatory life without parole sentence and required those who were previously sentenced to life to be given a chance for a resentencing.

== See also ==
- List of school shootings in the United States (before 2000)
- List of school-related attacks
