= Sand Quarry Hollow =

- Sand Quarry Hollow (the United States)
- Floor elevation: 138 m (453 ft)

Geography
- Coordinates: 35.889°N 87.649°W

Sand Quarry is a valley in Hickman County, Tennessee, in the United States.

Sand Quarry was named from deposits of sand which were mined there to be used in nearby blast furnaces.
