= Centerville Municipal Airport (Tennessee) =

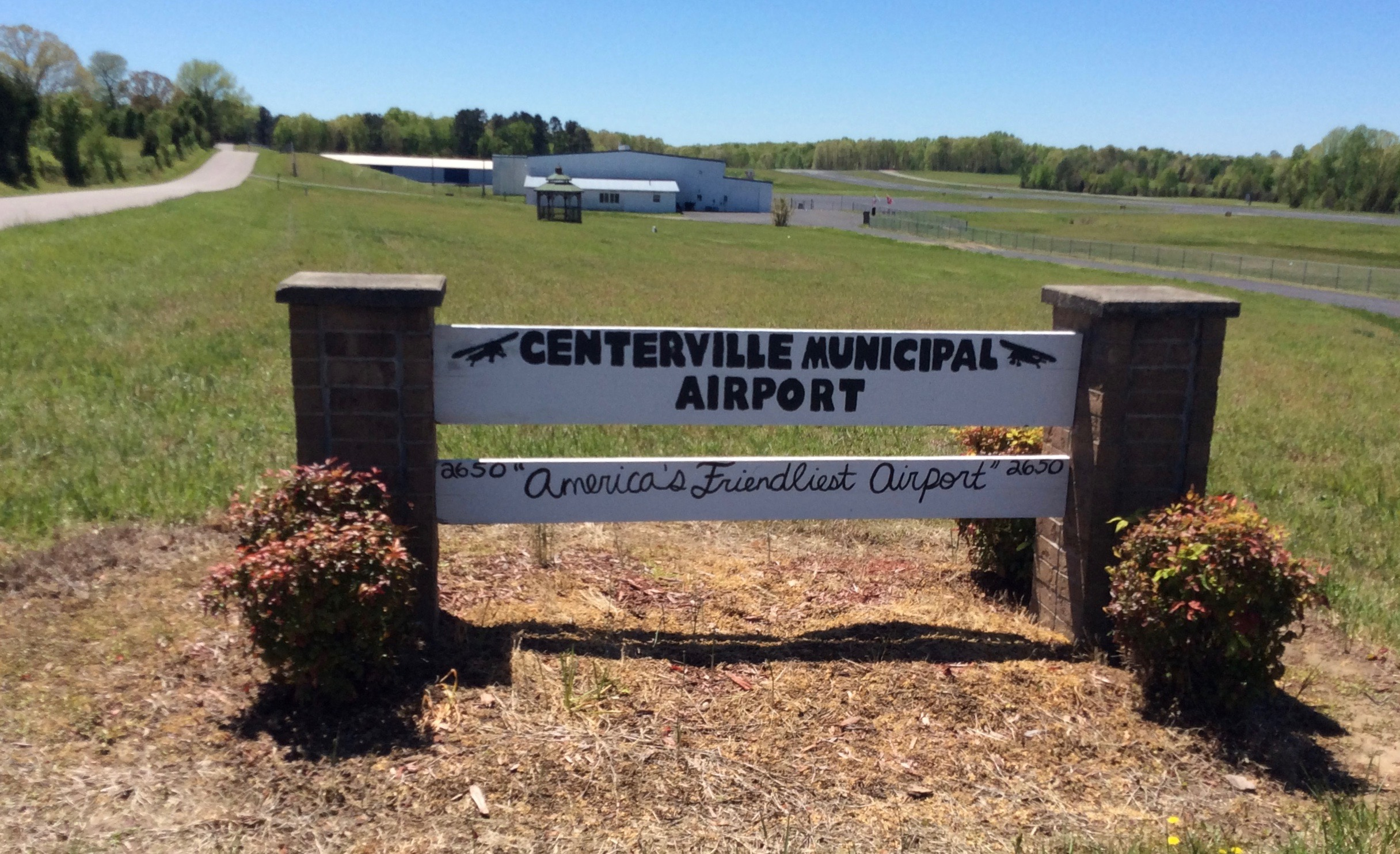
- IATA: GHM; ICAO: KGHM; FAA LID: GHM

Summary
- Airport type: Public
- Owner: City of Centerville
- Serves: Centerville, Tennessee
- Location: 2650 Airport Rd, Centerville, TN 37033
- Elevation AMSL: 768 ft (234 m)
- Coordinates: 35°50′14″N 087°26′43″W

Map
- Location of airport in Tennessee GHM (the United States)

Runways
| Direction | Length | | Surface |
| Direction | ft | m | Surface |
|---|---|---|---|
| 2/20 | 4,002 | 1,220 | Asphalt |

Statistics (2004)
- Aircraft operations: 6,350
- Based aircraft: 14
- Source: Federal Aviation Administration

Centerville Municipal Airport (IATA: GHM, ICAO: KGHM, FAA LID: GHM) is a city-owned public-use airport located three miles (5 km) north of the central business district of Centerville, a city in Hickman County, Tennessee, United States.

== Facilities and aircraft ==
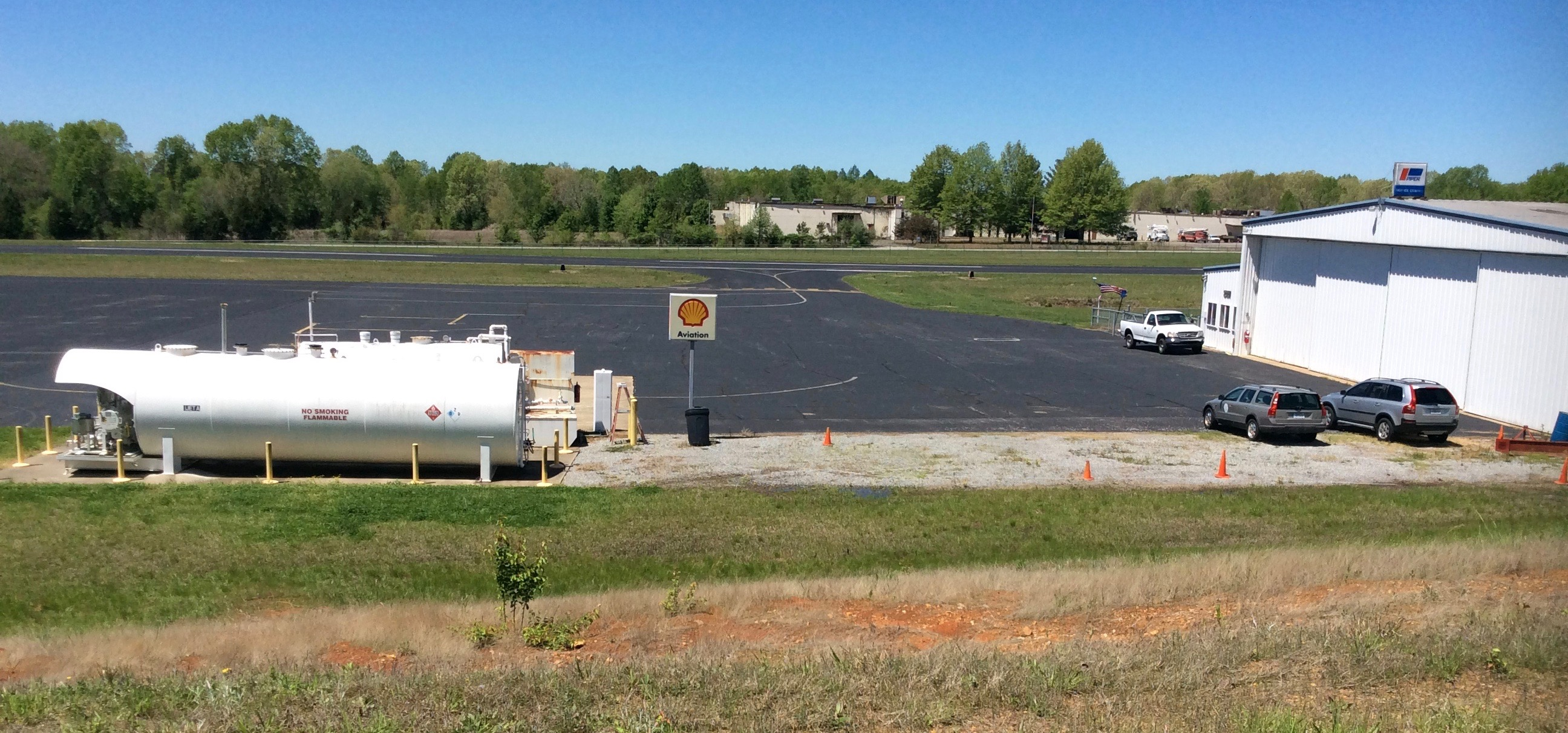
Terminal and fueling areas beside the airport office

Centerville Municipal Airport covers an area of 100 acres (40 ha) and contains one asphalt paved runway designated 2/20 which measures 4,002 x 75 ft (1,220 x 23 m). For the 12-month period ending December 31, 2004, the airport had 6,350 aircraft operations, an average of 17 per day: 99% general aviation and 1% military. There are 14 aircraft based at this airport: 64% single-engine and 36% multi-engine.

== See also ==
- List of airports in Tennessee
