= Beth Slater Whitson =

American songwriter

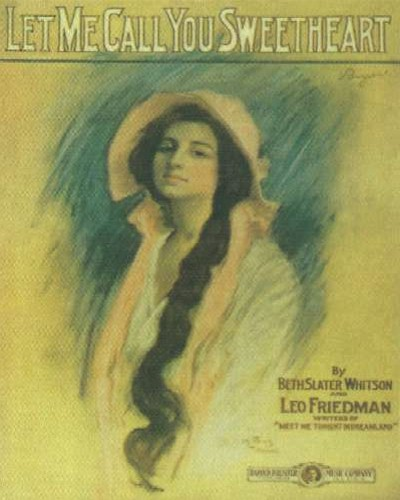
- Whitson on the cover of Let me call you sweetheart
- Born: Beth Slater Whitson; December 1, 1879; Goodrich, Tennessee, US
- Died: April 26, 1930 (aged 50); Nashville Tennessee, US
- Occupations: Singer, songwriter, writer
- Known for: Singing, songwriting

Beth Slater Whitson (December 1, 1879 – April 26, 1930) was an American lyricist.

Whitson was born on December 1, 1879, in Goodrich, Tennessee. She was the daughter of John H. Whitson and Anna Slater Whitson. Her father was the Co-Editor of the Hickman Pioneer newspaper. Whitson began her songwriting in Hickman County, Tennessee.

In 1913, Whitson and her family moved to Nashville where she and her sister Alice continued to write and publish. Beth’s local biographer, Grace Baxter Thompson, remarked at the dedication of a state historical marker to Whitson’s career in 1978: “She gave beauty and color and enjoyment to her community from which those qualities have been far-reaching and long-lasting”. She composed lyrics to over 400 songs, and is best remembered for the songs "Meet Me Tonight in Dreamland" (1909) and "Let Me Call You Sweetheart" (1910), both becoming one of the largest selling songs in sheet music. Her first major hit, "Meet Me Tonight in Dreamland", became known in 1949 when it was featured in the movie In the Good Old Summertime.

She is interred at Spring Hill Cemetery in Nashville, Tennessee.
