= Chimney Hollow =

Valley in Tennessee, United States

Coordinates: 35.9849°N 87.5156°W

Chimney Hollow is a valley in Hickman County, Tennessee, in the United States.

Chimney Hollow was named from a geological formation the valley contains resembling a chimney.
