= Sugar Creek (Duck River tributary) =

Stream in Hickman County, Tennessee, U.S.

Coordinates: 35.8889532°N 87.6889102°W

Sugar Creek is a stream in Hickman County, Tennessee, United States. It is a tributary of Duck River.

Sugar Creek was named for the sugar maple trees (Acer saccharum) growing along its banks.

== See also ==
- List of rivers of Tennessee
