= Turney Center Industrial Complex =

State prison in Only, Hickman County, Tennessee

Coordinates: 35°49′54″N 87°41′16″W

- Interactive map of Turney Center Industrial Complex
- Location: 1499 R W Moore Memorial Rt Hwy Only, Tennessee
- Status: Open
- Security class: Close / Mixed
- Capacity: 1,574
- Opened: 1971
- Managed by: Tennessee Department of Correction
- Director: Warden Taurean James

The Turney Center Industrial Complex is a state prison in Only, Hickman County, Tennessee, owned and operated by the Tennessee Department of Correction. The facility opened in 1971 originally serving as Turney Center for Youthful Offenders. Later changed to Turney Center Prison, Turney Center Industrial Farm and Prison and by 2008 assuming its current name of Turney Center Industrial Complex.

Turney also has a minimum-security Annex at 245 Carroll Road, Clifton, Wayne County, Tennessee. This facility opened in 1985 and was formerly the Wayne County Boot Camp.

== Notable prisoners ==
- Brandon E. Banks - rapist in Vanderbilt rape case, serving 15 years.
- Kong Bounnam - featured in I (Almost) Got Away with It
- Bruce Mendenhall - "The Truckstop Killer"
- Jamie Ellison Rouse - perpetrator of the 1995 Richland High School shooting
