= Tennessee State Route 417 =

State highway in Lewisburg, Tennessee

State Route 417
- W Ellington Parkway
- TN 417 highlighted in red

Route information
- Maintained by TDOT
- Length: 1.90 mi (3.06 km)

Major junctions
- South end: SR 373 in Lewisburg
- North end: US 431 in Lewisburg

Location
- Country: United States
- State: Tennessee
- Counties: Marshall

Highway system
- Tennessee State Routes; Interstate; US; State
← SR 416	→ SR 418

State Route 417 (SR 417), also known as W Ellington Parkway, is a short 1.90-mile-long (3.06 km) north-south state highway located entirely in the city of Lewisburg, Tennessee.

== Route description ==
SR 417 begins at an intersection with SR 373 (Mooresville Highway/W Commerce Street) in the western part of the city. It heads north through wooded areas before curving to the northeast and passing through suburban areas, where it passes by Marshall County High School and Lewisburg Middle School. The highway curves to the east to pass by Westhills Elementary School before it comes to an end at an intersection with US 431 (N Ellington Parkway/SR 50/SR 106). The entire route of SR 417 is a two-lane highway.

== Major intersections ==
The entire route is in Lewisburg, Marshall County.

mi	km	Destinations	Notes
0.00	0.00	SR 373 (Mooresville Highway/W Commerce Street) to I-65 – Culleoka, Downtown	Southern terminus
1.90	3.06	US 431 (N Ellington Parkway/SR 50/SR 106) – Columbia, Franklin, Petersburg, Fayetteville	Northern terminus
1.000 mi = 1.609 km; 1.000 km = 0.621 mi
