= Pleasantville, Tennessee =

Unincorporated community in Hickman County, Tennessee

Coordinates: 35.6671°N 87.6993°W

Pleasantville is an unincorporated community in Hickman County in the state of Tennessee, United States.
