= Whitfield, Tennessee =

Human settlement in Hickman County, Tennessee, United States

Coordinates: 35°46′59″N 87°37′08″W

Whitfield is an unincorporated community in Hickman County, in the U.S. state of Tennessee.

== History ==
A post office was established at Whitfield in 1856, and remained in operation until it was discontinued in 1905. The community was named for John W. Whitfield, a State Senator and native of Hickman County.
