= Shelby Bend Archeological District =

- U.S. National Register of Historic Places
- Nearest city: Greenfield Bend, Tennessee
- Area: 90 acres (36 ha)
- NRHP reference No.: 89001760
- Added to NRHP: February 1, 1990

The Shelby Bend Archeological District, in Hickman and Maury counties near Greenfield Bend, Tennessee, was listed on the National Register of Historic Places in 1990.

It includes six contributing sites, including the Oldroy Site (40HI131), the Mayberry Site (40HI132, 40HI133) and one with Gordon S in its name.

It was listed for its information potential.
