= Tennessee State Route 373 =

State highway in Tennessee, United States

State Route 373
- TN 373 highlighted in red

Route information
- Maintained by TDOT
- Length: 17.1 mi (27.5 km)
- Existed: July 1, 1983–present

Major junctions
- West end: SR 50 near Culleoka
- I-65 near Lewisburg; SR 417 in Lewisburg
- East end: US 31A Bus. / US 431 Bus. in Lewisburg

Location
- Country: United States
- State: Tennessee
- Counties: Maury, Marshall

Highway system
- Tennessee State Routes; Interstate; US; State
← SR 372	→ SR 374

State Route 373 (SR 373) is a 17.1-mile-long (27.5 km) east-west state highway in southern Middle Tennessee. It connects the community of Culleoka with the cities of Lewisburg and Columbia, along with I-65.

== Route description ==
SR 373 begins in Maury County at an intersection with SR 50 a few miles southeast of Columbia. It heads south as Culleoka Highway through farmland as a two-lane highway to pass through Culleoka, where it makes a sharp turn to the east. The highway winds its way east through more hilly terrain for a few miles to cross into Marshall County. SR 373 winds its way through rural hilly countryside for several more miles as Mooresville Highway, where it has an interchange with I-65 (Exit 32) and widens to a four-lane undivided highway, before entering Lewisburg at an intersection with SR 417 (W Ellington Parkway). The highway becomes W Commerce Street and passes through neighborhoods for several miles before entering downtown. SR 373 then comes to an end at the courthouse square at an intersection with US 31A Business/US 431 Business/SR 11/SR 50 (2nd Avenue/E Commerce Street).

== History ==
The entire route of SR 373 was originally designated as State Route 50A (SR 50A). It was renumbered, as many of Tennessee's alternate routes were, to SR 373 during the 1983 renumbering.

== Major intersections ==
County	Location	mi	km	Destinations	Notes
Maury		0.0	0.0	SR 50 (New Lewisburg Highway) – Columbia, Lewisburg	Western terminus
Marshall				I-65 – Nashville, Huntsville	I-65 exit 32
Marshall	Lewisburg			SR 417 north (W Ellington Parkway)	Southern terminus of SR 417
Marshall	Lewisburg	17.1	27.5	US 31A Bus. / US 431 Bus. (2nd Avenue/E Commerce Street/SR 11/SR 50)	Eastern terminus
1.000 mi = 1.609 km; 1.000 km = 0.621 mi
