= Littlelot, Tennessee =

- Unincorporated community
- Location within Tennessee Location within the United States
- Coordinates: 35°47′20″N 87°19′23″W
- Country: United States
- State: Tennessee
- County: Hickman
- Elevation: 548 ft (167 m)
- Time zone: UTC-6 (Central (CST))
  - Summer (DST): UTC-5 (CDT)
- Area code: 931
- GNIS feature ID: 1291720

Littlelot is an unincorporated community in Hickman County, Tennessee, United States. Littlelot is located on Tennessee State Route 230, 8.1 miles (13.0 km) east of Centerville.

Littlelot was named for its diminutive size when a founder declared: "It is such a damn little lot, we can't give it a big name".
