= Bond, Tennessee =

Unincorporated community in Tennessee, US

Coordinates: 35°43′27″N 87°24′02″W

Bond is an unincorporated community in Hickman County, in the U.S. state of Tennessee.

== History ==
The community was likely named for Joseph McRea Bond, a local pioneer.
