= Buffalo, Hickman County, Tennessee =

- Unincorporated community
- Location within Tennessee Location within the United States
- Coordinates: 35°41′15″N 87°29′17″W
- Country: United States
- State: Tennessee
- County: Hickman
- Elevation: 866 ft (264 m)
- Time zone: UTC-6 (Central (CST))
  - Summer (DST): UTC-5 (CDT)
- Area code: 931
- GNIS feature ID: 1314763

Buffalo is an unincorporated community in Hickman County, Tennessee, United States.
