= Grinder's Switch, Tennessee =

Location in Tennessee, US

Coordinates: 35.792°N 87.485°W

Grinders Switch is a location just outside Centerville, Tennessee, which consists of little more than the railroad switch for which it is named.

== Significance to Minnie Pearl ==
Grinders Switch was also the fictional hometown of the comic character Minnie Pearl, created and portrayed at the Grand Ole Opry by comedian Sarah Ophelia Colley Cannon, who grew up in the nearby town of Centerville, Tennessee.

Sarah Ophelia Colley Cannon's father was a lumberman who shipped logs from the Grinders depot on the Centerville branch of the Nashville, Chattanooga and St. Louis Railway. A team track at the depot necessitated the installation of a switch. Long after the depot disappeared, the team track and its switch remained, thus the name "Grinders Switch". Grinders was still listed in the railroad tariff book called Official List of Open and Prepay Stations No. 82 dated November 15, 1967.

Sarah Colley sometimes accompanied her father to the Grinders depot, where the local characters would hang out. This was part of her inspiration for her "Cousin Minnie Pearl" routine.

Minnie Pearl closes her autobiography:

People always ask me, "Where is Grinders Switch?"

As I grow older, the place is no longer a little, abandoned landing switch on a railroad in Hickman County. Grinders Switch is a state of mind – a place where there is no illness, no war, no unhappiness, no political unrest, no tears. It's a place where there's only happiness – where all you worry about is what you are going to wear to the church social, and if your feller is going to kiss you in the moonlight on the way home.

I wish for all you a Grinders Switch.

So much unwarranted traffic to Grinders Switch, looking for the hometown Pearl described, was generated by tourists following the road sign, that the Hickman County Highway Department was finally motivated to change the designation on the "Grinders Switch" road sign to "Hickman Springs Road".

== Tourism initiatives and special events ==
A "Grinders Switch" theme park was proposed for the area, with promoters going so far as to move the former railroad depot of Slayden, Tennessee, to the area to serve as one of its buildings, but little more seems to have been done. The park failed and all investors lost their money. The railroad depot remains, however. Hickman County bought the land where it operates the Hickman County Agriculture Pavilion. The Hickman County Fair is located at the pavilion. The National Banana Pudding Festival, one of Hickman County's more popular events, had been held at the Hickman County Agriculture Pavilion and Fairgrounds, featuring live music concerts, many attractions, and many kinds of banana puddings. but has now been relocated to Patton's River Park, a location closer to the rest of Centerville.

== In popular culture ==
Charlie Daniels mentions southern rock band Grinderswitch in his 1975 song "The South's Gonna Do It", with the lyric that is also a play on the name of the town, "Well, the train to Grinders Switch is runnin' right on time and them Tucker Boys are cookin' down in Caroline".

Tyler Farr mentions Grinders Switch in his 2015 song "C.O.U.N.T.R.Y.", written by Chris Tompkins, Craig Wiseman, and Rodney Clawson.
