= Swan Bluff, Tennessee =

Unincorporated community in Tennessee, US

Coordinates: 35°42′51″N 87°25′43″W

Swan Bluff is an unincorporated community in Hickman County, in the U.S. state of Tennessee.

== History ==
A post office called Swan Bluff was established in 1874, and remained in operation until it was discontinued in 1914. The community was named from a nearby natural bluff.
