= James Buchanan Walker House =

- U.S. National Register of Historic Places
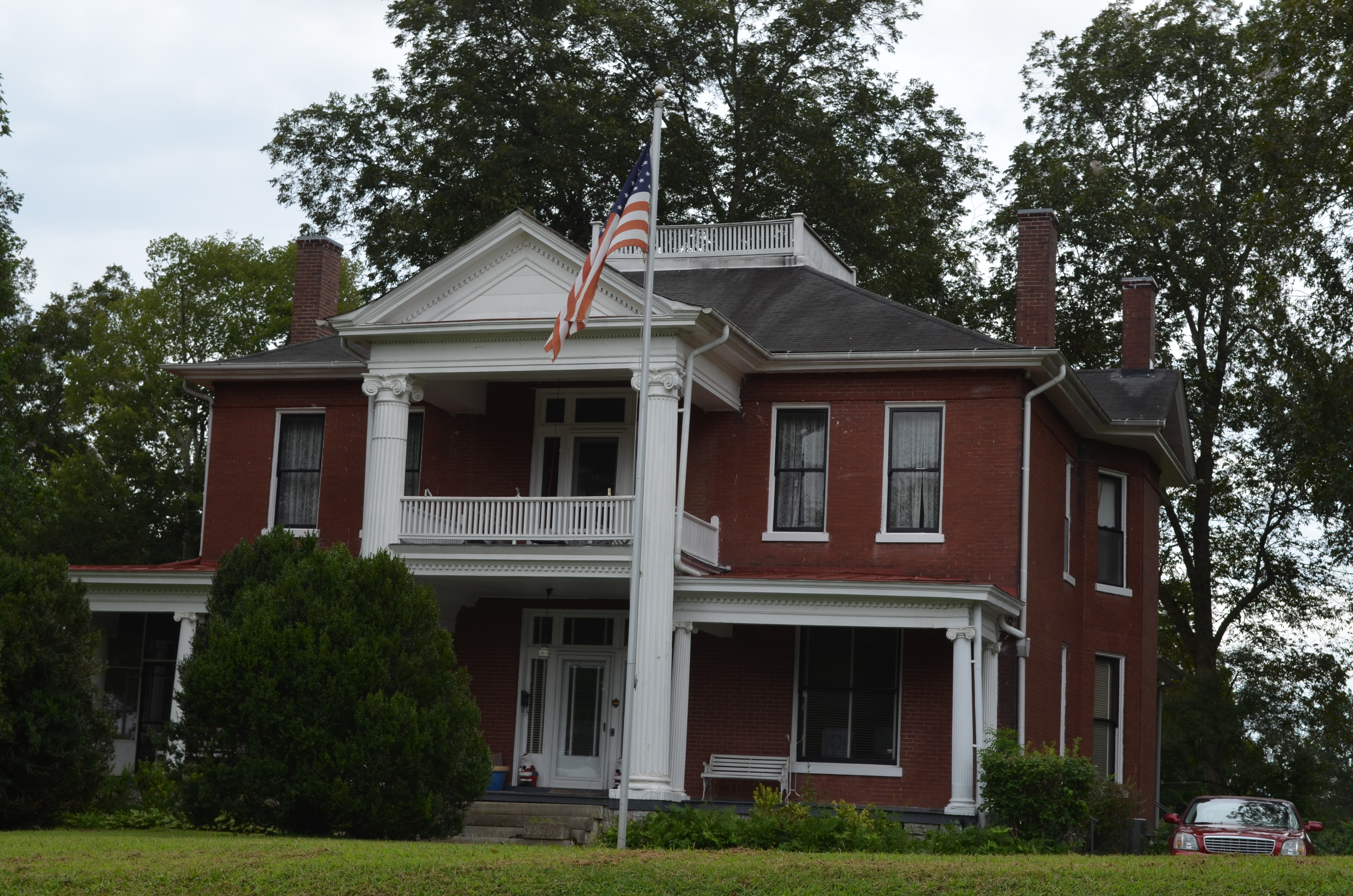

- Location within Tennessee
- Location: West End and S. Barnwell Aves., Centerville, Tennessee
- Coordinates: 35°46′44″N 87°28′13″W
- Area: 1.3 acres (0.53 ha)
- Built: 1903
- Architect: Clarence K. Coley
- Architectural style: Classical Revival
- NRHP reference No.: 89000146
- Added to NRHP: March 2, 1989

The James Buchanan Walker House, in Centerville, Tennessee, was built in 1903. It was listed on the National Register of Historic Places in 1989.

It is Classical Revival in style, designed by Clarence K. Coley. It has a "portico with tall round reeded columns topped by Scamozzi capitals."
