= Bon Aqua Springs Historic District =

Historic district in Tennessee, United States

- U.S. National Register of Historic Places
- Location within Tennessee
- Location: Old Hwy. 46, SE of Bon Aqua, Bon Aqua, Tennessee
- Coordinates: 35°56′46″N 87°19′02″W
- Area: 125 acres (51 ha)
- NRHP reference No.: 90000303
- Added to NRHP: February 23, 1990

The Bon Aqua Springs Historic District near Bon Aqua, Tennessee is a 125 acres (51 ha) historic district which was listed on the National Register of Historic Places in 1990. The listing included six contributing buildings, seven contributing structures, and a contributing site.

It was developed as a mineral springs resort, the Bon Aqua Springs Spa, located .5 miles (0.80 km) southeast of the unincorporated community of Bon Aqua. The district includes remnants of the resort, including houses, spring houses, a cottage, a corn crib, bridges, a dam, a swimming pool, and a reservoir.
