= Goodrich, Tennessee =

Unincorporated community in Tennessee, US

Coordinates: 35°50′41″N 87°28′43″W

Goodrich is an unincorporated community in Hickman County, in the U.S. state of Tennessee.

== History ==
A post office called Goodrich was established in 1884, and remained in operation until it was discontinued in 1933. The community was named for Levin D. Goodrich, a local businessman in the blast furnace industry.
