= Only, Tennessee =

Only
- Unincorporated community
- Location within Tennessee Location within the United States
- Coordinates: 35°51′42″N 87°41′30″W
- Country: United States
- State: Tennessee
- County: Hickman
- Elevation: 453 ft (138 m)

Population (2019)
  - Total: 1,493
- Time zone: UTC-6 (Central (CST))
  - Summer (DST): UTC-5 (CDT)
- ZIP code: 37140
- Area code: 931
- GNIS feature ID: 1296439

Only is an unincorporated community in Hickman County, Tennessee, United States. Only is located on Tennessee State Route 229 near Tennessee State Route 50 and Interstate 40, 13.9 miles (22.4 km) west-northwest of Centerville. Only has a post office, with ZIP code 37140.

== History ==
The origin of the place name Only is obscure. Some state its name is derived from the Lonlly family of pioneer settlers, while others believe the name refers to a store owner who was always heard to describe his prices as "only five cents", etc.
