= Remington Model 522 Viper =

Remington 522 Viper
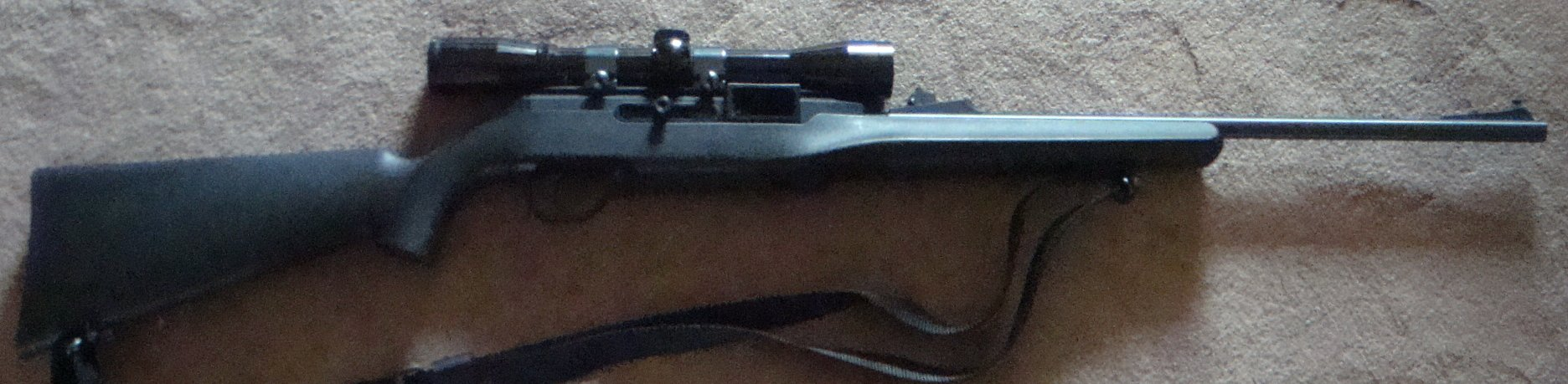
- Type: Rifle
- Place of origin: United States

Production history
- Designer: Remington Arms
- Designed: 1993
- Manufacturer: Remington Arms
- Produced: 1993–1998
- Variants: 1

Specifications
- Mass: 4.63 pounds (2.10 kg)
- Length: 40 inches (1,000 mm)
- Barrel length: 20 inches (510 mm)
- Cartridge: .22 Long Rifle
- Action: semi-automatic
- Muzzle velocity: 1000 to 1500 ft/s (305 to 460 m/s)
- Maximum firing range: 500 feet or 150 meters
- Feed system: Magazine to 25 (after market magazines) and 10 with factory magazines/rounds
- Sights: Iron sights with a Williams-type rear sight

The Remington Model 522 Viper is a semi-automatic rifle chambered for the .22 Long Rifle cartridge. The Viper uses mostly polymer in construction; only the barrel, bolt and a few small parts are steel.

== Features ==
The stock is made of Rynite. Barrel length is 20 inches and weight is 4.5 pounds. The rifle has an integral scope mount rail. The polymer receiver is permanently attached to the barrel and the sights are attached to the barrel by machine screws. Magazine capacity is 10 rounds. Remington briefly produced 25 round magazines for the Viper, but the rifle's introduction was only months before the 1994 Federal Assault Weapons Ban, and the model 522 was dropped before the ban sunset in 2004. The stock did not include provision for sling mounts; these had to be added by the owner or a gunsmith.

The rifle features both a magazine disconnect safety and a manual safety, as well as a last-round hold-open.

Official capacity is 11 rounds ("includes 1 in chamber"). This requires chambering a round through the port and then inserting the magazine loaded with 10 rounds.

== History ==
The Viper replaced the Remington Nylon 66. Early reviews were generally positive, but enough people had problems that the Viper never really took off. Early production Vipers had a hefty steel magazine typically described as "bulletproof". Later production Vipers came with plastic magazines that were often problematic.

The Viper was succeeded by the Remington 597. Due to its short production history and mediocre acceptance by gun owners, a Viper accessory market never materialized.
