= Aetna, Hickman County, Tennessee =

Unincorporated community in Tennessee, US

Coordinates: 35°39′18″N 87°30′17″W

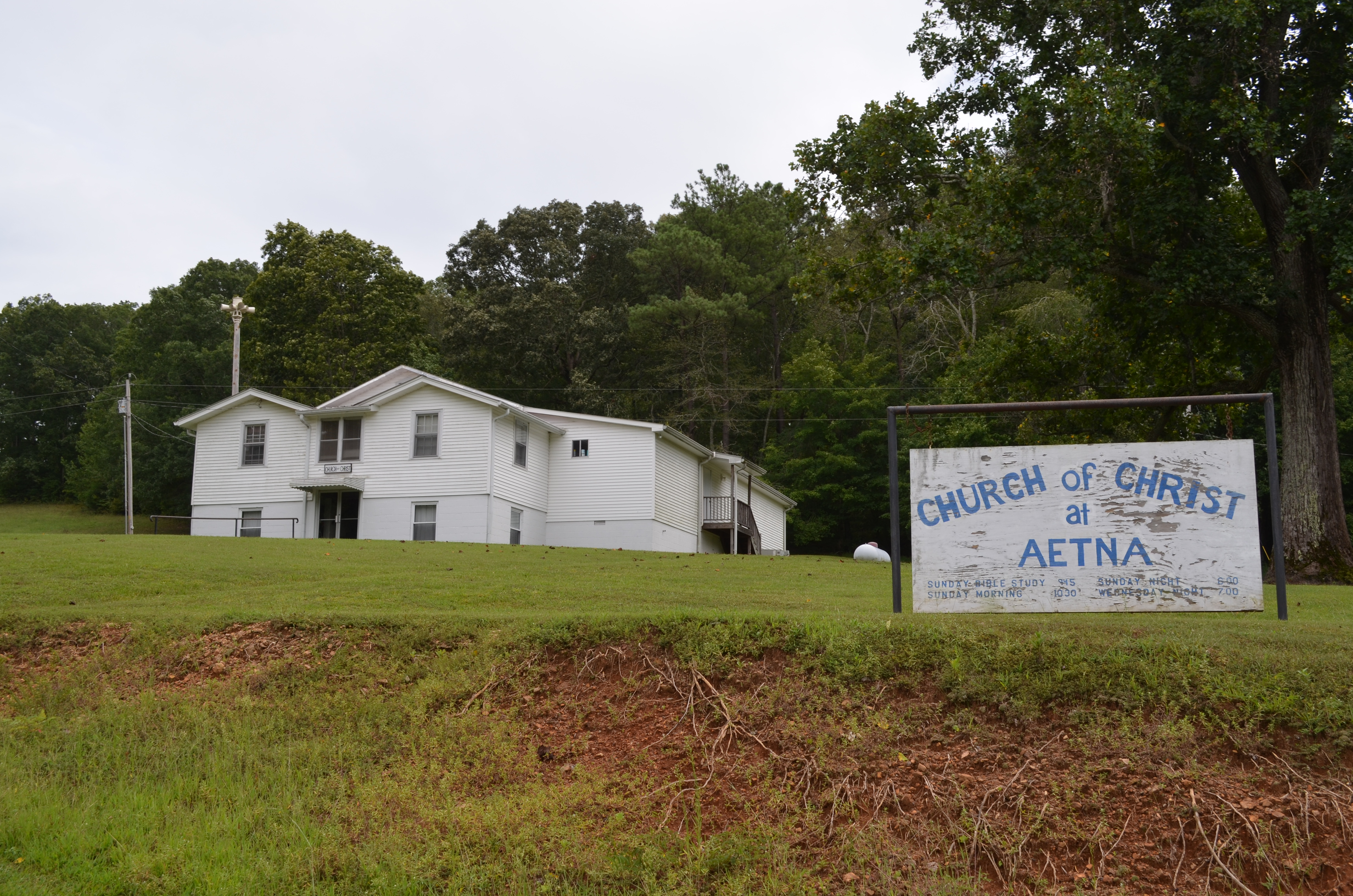
Aetna Church of Christ in Aetna

Aetna is an unincorporated community in Hickman County, Tennessee. United States. It lies at an elevation of 699 feet (213 m).

== History ==
A post office called Aetna was established in 1886, and closed one year later in 1887. Aetna was named after the Sicilian volcano, Mount Etna.
