= Primm Springs Historic District =

Historic district in Tennessee, United States

- U.S. National Register of Historic Places
- Location within Tennessee
- Location: Irregular Pattern along the Puppy Branch of Dog Creek between House & Baker Rds. & Mineral Springs, Primm Springs, Tennessee
- Coordinates: 35°49′24″N 87°15′01″W
- Area: 8 acres (3.2 ha)
- Built by: Multiple
- NRHP reference No.: 85001480
- Added to NRHP: July 5, 1985

The Primm Springs Historic District in Primm Springs, Tennessee is a 8 acres (3.2 ha) historic district which was listed on the National Register of Historic Places in 1985. The listing included 15 contributing buildings, three contributing structures, and two contributing sites.

It is the location of a historic mineral springs resort. It runs along the Puppy Branch of Dog Creek, through a hollow, where shale formations release waters with dissolved minerals. There were once five mineral springs; three remained in 1985, "sulphur", "arsenic", and "calomel". The district includes "a good collection of vernacular frame structures including a large hotel, another smaller boarding house, six family summercabins or cottages, a dance hall, two small stores, and two frame residences designed for year round use, as well as a number of outbuildings including springhouses, kitchens, smokehouses, barns, and sheds. Most of the buildings were designed for summer use only."
