= Nunnelly, Tennessee =

- Unincorporated community
- Location within Tennessee Location within the United States
- Coordinates: 35°51′34″N 87°28′09″W
- Country: United States
- State: Tennessee
- County: Hickman
- Elevation: 702 ft (214 m)
- Time zone: UTC-6 (Central (CST))
  - Summer (DST): UTC-5 (CDT)
- ZIP code: 37137
- Area code: 931
- GNIS feature ID: 1296026

Nunnelly is an unincorporated community in Hickman County, Tennessee, United States. Nunnelly is located at the junction of state routes 48 and 230, 5.6 miles (9.0 km) north of Centerville. Nunnelly has a post office, with ZIP code 37137.
