= Bucksnort, Tennessee =

Spring in Tennessee, United States

Coordinates: 35°53′31″N 87°38′22″W

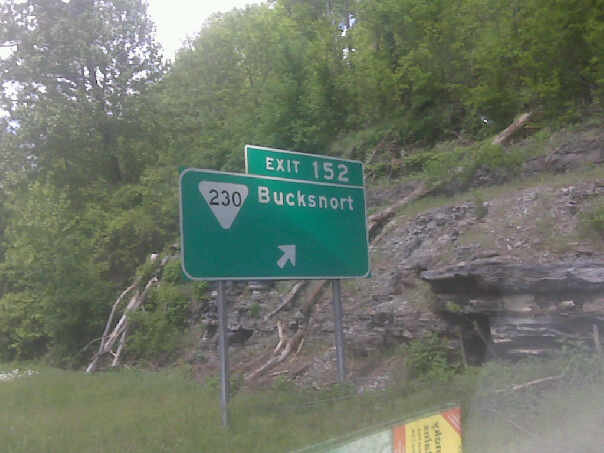
Exit sign along eastbound I-40 for Bucksnort

Bucksnort is a spring in Hickman County, Tennessee, United States, located on Sugar Creek, 0.2 miles (0.32 km) downstream of the confluence of the South Fork of Sugar Creek, 0.2 miles (0.32 km) to the south-east of Exit 152 on Interstate 40, and 2.7 miles (4.3 km) west of Spot. There are no available U.S. Census statistics for the location and there is no post office. A trout farm business operated just upstream and adjacent to the I-40 in 1967, operated by Mr. and Mrs. Joda Austin.

According to the county historian, the name Bucksnort comes from a one-time merchant who sold a 'snort' of moonshine for a dollar (buck).

Also at the confluence of Sugar Creek and South Fork (also known as Coleman's Branch) was Lee's Furnace, later to be called Lee's Old Furnace. It was named after Samuel B. Lee, who together with James Gould bought a large tract of land for mining and timber production in 1830. It was soon abandoned, as the mineral deposits were found to be located further away from the furnace than was expected, near Vernon.

A Methodist church was established here some time after 1856.
