= Bon Aqua Junction, Tennessee =

- Census-designated place
- Location within Tennessee Location within the United States
- Coordinates: 35°55′40″N 87°18′39″W
- Country: United States
- State: Tennessee
- County: Hickman

Area
  - Total: 4.71 sq mi (12.20 km^{2})
  - Land: 4.71 sq mi (12.20 km^{2})
  - Water: 0 sq mi (0.00 km^{2})
- Elevation: 902 ft (275 m)

Population (2020)
  - Total: 1,279
  - Density: 271.5/sq mi (104.84/km^{2})
- Time zone: UTC-6 (Central (CST))
  - Summer (DST): UTC-5 (CDT)
- Area code: 931
- GNIS feature ID: 1277925

Bon Aqua Junction is a census-designated place and unincorporated community in Hickman County, Tennessee, United States. Its population was 1,230 as of the 2010 census.

Bon Aqua was located at a road junction outside of Bon Aqua, hence the name.

== Demographics ==
Historical population
| Census | Pop. | Note | %± |
|---|---|---|---|
| 2020 | 1,279 | | — |
U.S. Decennial Census
