= Slayden, Tennessee =

- Town
- Location of Slayden in Dickson County, Tennessee.
- Coordinates: 36°17′39″N 87°28′14″W
- Country: United States
- State: Tennessee
- County: Dickson

Area
  - Total: 1.53 sq mi (3.97 km^{2})
  - Land: 1.53 sq mi (3.97 km^{2})
  - Water: 0 sq mi (0.00 km^{2})
- Elevation: 735 ft (224 m)

Population (2020)
  - Total: 170
  - Density: 110.9/sq mi (42.82/km^{2})
- Time zone: UTC-6 (Central (CST))
  - Summer (DST): UTC-5 (CDT)
- ZIP code: 37165
- Area code: 615
- FIPS code: 47-69080
- GNIS feature ID: 1303663

Slayden is a town in Dickson County, Tennessee, United States. As of the 2020 census, Slayden had a population of 170.

== Geography ==
Slayden is located in northwestern Dickson County at 36°17′39″N 87°28′14″W (36.294208, -87.470514). Tennessee State Route 235 passes through the town, leading northeast 10 miles (16 km) to Cunningham and south 18 miles (29 km) to Dickson.

According to the United States Census Bureau, Slayden has a total area of 1.4 square miles (3.5 km^{2}), all land.

== Demographics ==
Historical population
Census	Pop.	Note	%±
1920	158		—
1930	162		2.5%
1940	164		1.2%
1950	90		−45.1%
1960	101		12.2%
1970	95		−5.9%
1980	69		−27.4%
1990	111		60.9%
2000	185		66.7%
2010	178		−3.8%
2020	170		−4.5%

As of the census of 2000, there were 185 people, 79 households, and 54 families residing in the town. The population density was 341.7 inhabitants per square mile (131.9/km^{2}). There were 86 housing units at an average density of 158.9 per square mile (61.4/km^{2}). The racial makeup of the town was 97.30% White, 0.54% African American, 1.62% Native American, and 0.54% from two or more races.

There were 79 households, of which 25.3% had children under the age of 18 living with them, 59.5% were married couples living together, 5.1% had a female householder with no husband present, and 30.4% were non-families. 27.8% of all households were made up of individuals, and 17.7% had someone living alone who was 65 years of age or older. The average household size was 2.34 and the average family size was 2.80.

In the town, the population was spread out, with 19.5% under the age of 18, 5.9% from 18 to 24, 29.2% from 25 to 44, 27.6% from 45 to 64, and 17.8% who were 65 years of age or older. The median age was 43 years. For every 100 females, there were 110.2 males. For every 100 females age 18 and over, there were 109.9 males.

The median income for a household in the town was $36,071, and the median income for a family was $46,042. Males had a median income of $25,417 versus $23,125 for females. The per capita income for the town was $20,189. About 8.2% of families and 9.7% of the population were below the poverty line, including none of those under the age of eighteen and 14.3% of those sixty-five or over.

== History ==
Slayden's growth was spurred by the existence of a railroad line (the "Mineral Branch" of the Louisville and Nashville Railroad) which was built in the late 19th century largely to assist the movement of iron from the nearby works at Cumberland Furnace to market. In the early 20th century Slayden was home to a department store and was considered a major community of Dickson County. With the closure of the Mineral Branch and the Cumberland Furnace works, the area went into an economic decline. As the area declined from the loss of the furnace works, nearby Nashville and Clarksville offered more non-farming opportunities. The local primary school was closed in 1960 and merged with the larger one in nearby Vanleer. At about this time mail ceased to be delivered from the post office, which continues to serve post office boxholders.

In the 1980 census, Slayden had only 69 inhabitants and was known for the next decade as Tennessee's smallest incorporated town. In the 1980s the former railroad depot was removed to Hickman County to become an attraction at a proposed amusement park honoring Minnie Pearl that never actually came into operation. The voting precinct in the area was abolished after the 2000 elections and split between those in Vanleer and Cumberland Furnace. In 2003 the town's future as an incorporated community seemed endangered when only six voters (out of 127 registered) participated in a municipal election and only two candidates qualified for the four unpaid positions on the Board of Mayor and Aldermen. This was prevented when the vacancies were filled by persons who had received write-in votes; participation in the 2005 municipal elections was considerably higher.

The Slayden family appears in the census for Dickson County in 1820, 1830 and 1840, by which time there were four Slayden heads of household, all being descended from brothers Daniel Everett Slayden and William Everett Slayden. Both lines produced a prodigious number of military officers, medical doctors, or dentists. One son of Daniel Everett Slayden was Hartwell Marable Slayden, born ca. 1806, who had three sons who were medical doctors: William Marshall Slayden, John Dann Slayden and Hartwell Marable Slayden Jr. All three sons of Hartwell M. are in the 1850 Dickson County census, along with one of the patriarchs "William Everette Slayden" listed as a "waggonmaker" born 1788 in Virginia, and four other heads of households. The name of the community probably reflects the land ownership (possibly plantations) of this family, as the 1860 census reveals 35 "white" members of this extended family, and there are also slaves on the 1860 Slave Schedules. Alternatively, it could reflect the service of the three physicians to the community. The Slayden Cemetery (sometimes called Guerin Cemetery, an allied family) holds many members of this family. The name continued into the 1930 census. Most other lines of this family (cousinage proven by DNA) now use "Slayton" or "Slaton" as name spelling, though a few "Slayden"s are still found in parts of Tennessee and Florida.
