= Greenfield Bend, Tennessee =

Community in Maury County, Tennessee

Coordinates: 35.6911815°N 87.2866775°W

Greenfield Bend, Tennessee is a community or former community in Maury County, Tennessee. It was the closest community to Shelby Bend Archeological District, which is listed on the National Register of Historic Places.

It is the location of the Greenfield Bend Cemetery.
