= Wrigley, Tennessee =

- Census-designated place
- Location within Tennessee Location within the United States
- Coordinates: 35°54′03″N 87°20′51″W
- Country: United States
- State: Tennessee
- County: Hickman

Area
  - Total: 0.96 sq mi (2.48 km^{2})
  - Land: 0.96 sq mi (2.48 km^{2})
  - Water: 0 sq mi (0.00 km^{2})
- Elevation: 781 ft (238 m)

Population (2020)
  - Total: 257
  - Density: 268.9/sq mi (103.83/km^{2})
- Time zone: UTC-6 (Central (CST))
  - Summer (DST): UTC-5 (CDT)
- Zip Code: 37098
- Area code: 931
- GNIS feature ID: 1275191

Wrigley is a census-designated place and unincorporated community in Hickman County, Tennessee, United States. Its population was 281 as of the 2010 census.

== Demographics ==
Historical population
Census	Pop.	Note	%±
2020	257		—
U.S. Decennial Census
