= Primm Springs, Tennessee =

- Unincorporated community
- Location within Tennessee Location within the United States
- Coordinates: 35°49′15″N 87°15′00″W
- Country: United States
- State: Tennessee
- County: Williamson
- Elevation: 614 ft (187 m)
- Time zone: UTC-6 (Central (CST))
  - Summer (DST): UTC-5 (CDT)
- ZIP code: 38476
- Area code: 931
- GNIS feature ID: 1298534

Primm Springs is an unincorporated community in Williamson County, Tennessee, United States. Its ZIP code is 38476.

Primm Springs took its name from a stream which was named for John T. Primm, an original owner of the surrounding land.
