= Bon Aqua, Tennessee =

- Unincorporated community
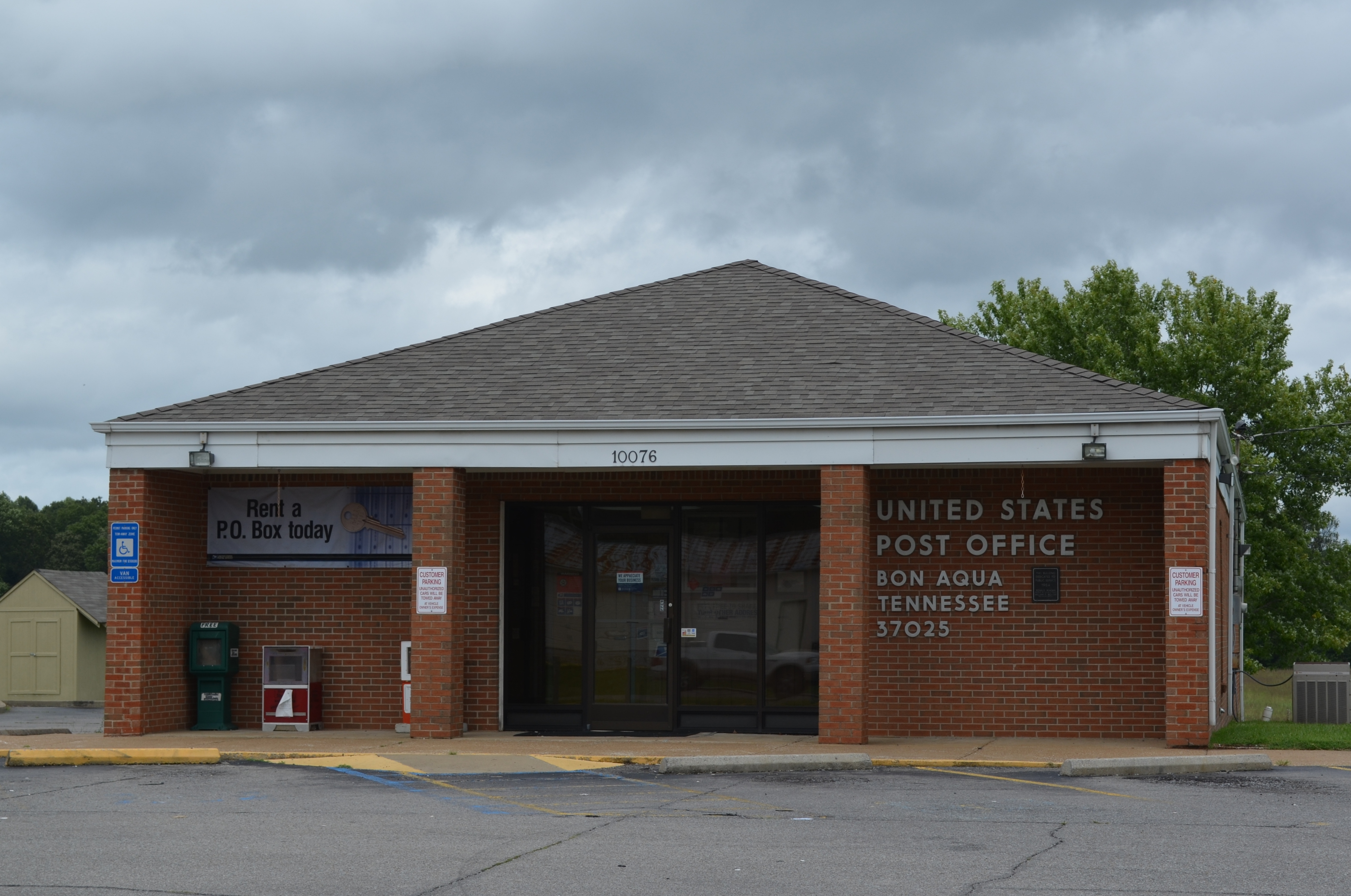
- U.S. Post office in Bon Aqua

- Location within Tennessee Location within the United States
- Coordinates: 35°57′12″N 87°19′37″W
- Country: United States
- State: Tennessee
- County: Hickman
- Elevation: 837 ft (255 m)
- Time zone: UTC-6 (Central (CST))
  - Summer (DST): UTC-5 (CDT)
- ZIP code: 37025
- Area code: 931
- GNIS feature ID: 1305340

Bon Aqua is an unincorporated community in Hickman County, Tennessee, United States. Bon Aqua is located in northern Hickman County, 9.2 miles (14.8 km) south-southeast of Dickson. It also covers parts of southeast Dickson county, and parts of western Williamson county. Bon Aqua has a post office with ZIP code 37025, which opened on March 5, 1842.

The community was named for the "good water" of a nearby mineral spring. Remnants of the former mineral springs resort are preserved as the Bon Aqua Springs Historic District, listed on the National Register of Historic Places.

Phillip Van Horn Weems, a Confederate major of the 11th Tennessee during the Civil War, owned Bon Aqua Springs before the war. Weems was killed in the Battle of Atlanta, and in the 1880s was exhumed from the Confederate cemetery in Griffin, Georgia. His body was returned in a vinegar barrel by wagon and buried in the family cemetery near Bon Aqua Springs.

Country music legend Johnny Cash owned Weems' old farmhouse as well as the Storytellers Museum, a former general store and recording studio.

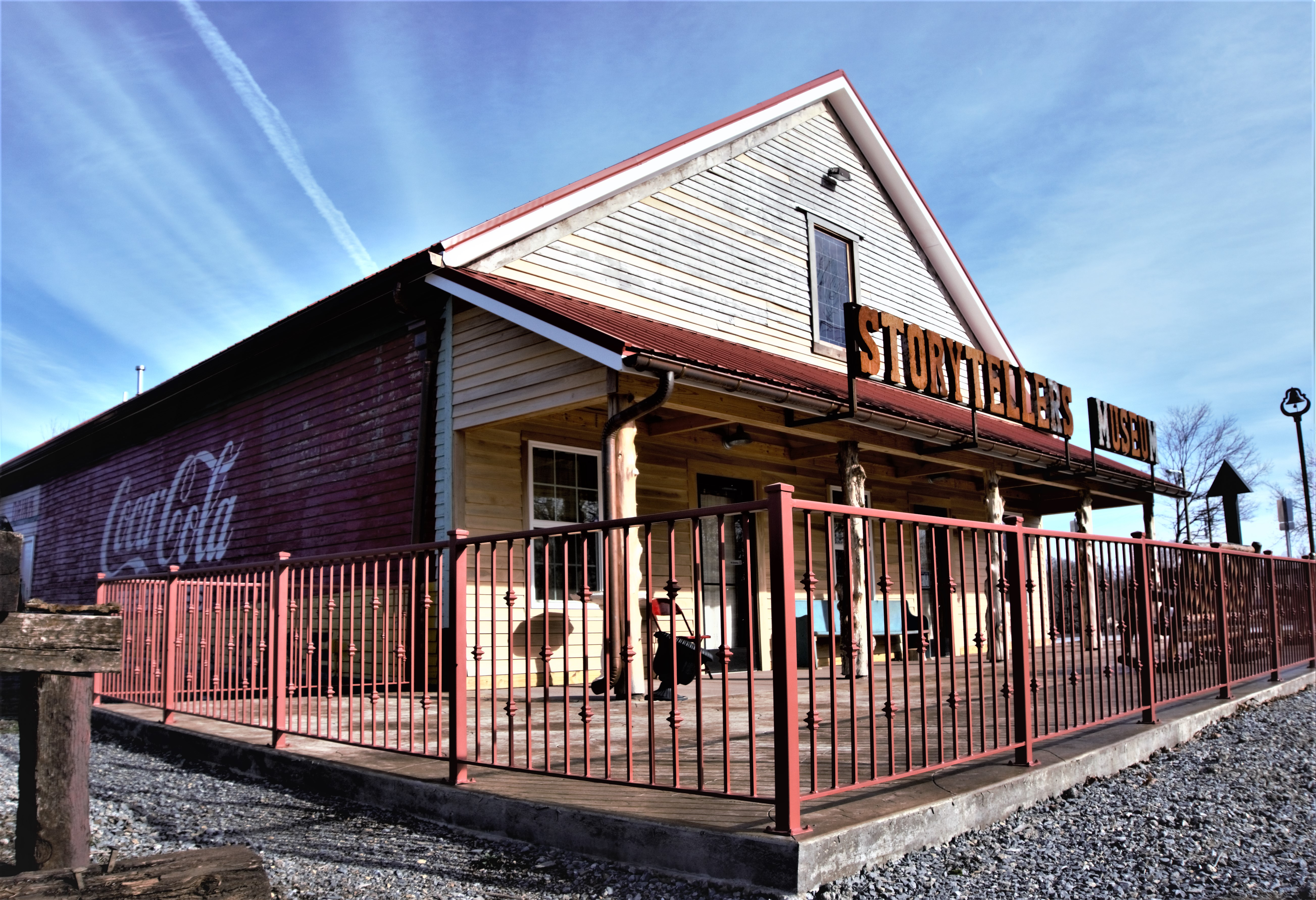
Storytellers museum-Landmark of Bon Aqua
