= Centerville, Tennessee =

- Town
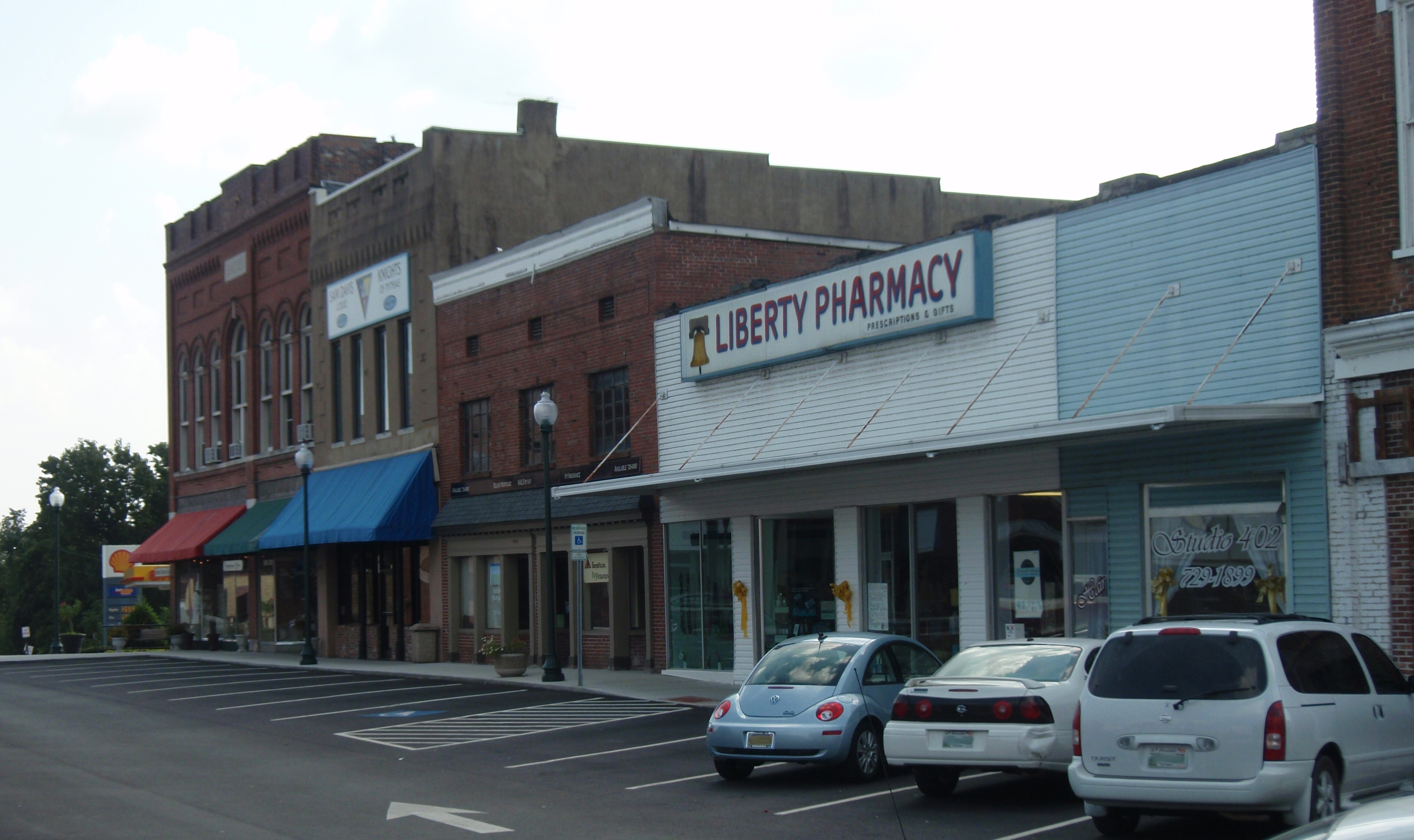
- Centerville Town Square

- Location in Hickman County, Tennessee
- Coordinates: 35°47′18″N 87°27′21″W
- Country: United States
- State: Tennessee
- County: Hickman

Area
  - Total: 10.76 sq mi (27.87 km^{2})
  - Land: 10.76 sq mi (27.87 km^{2})
  - Water: 0 sq mi (0.00 km^{2})
- Elevation: 620 ft (190 m)

Population (2020)
  - Total: 3,532
  - Density: 328.3/sq mi (126.74/km^{2})
- Time zone: UTC-6 (Central (CST))
  - Summer (DST): UTC-5 (CDT)
- ZIP code: 37033
- Area code: 931
- FIPS code: 47-12420
- GNIS feature ID: 1280155
- Website: centervilletn.org

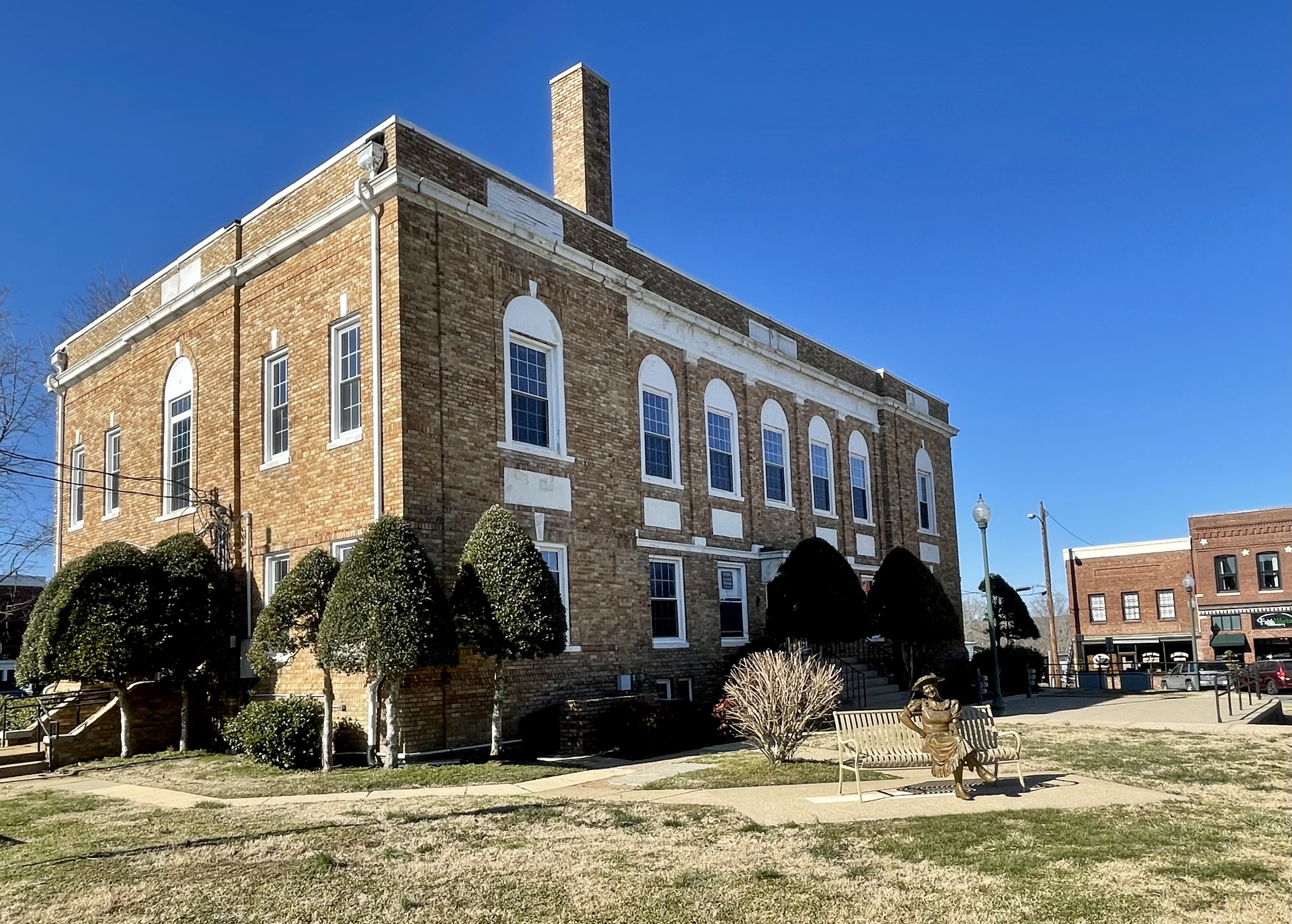
Hickman County Courthouse

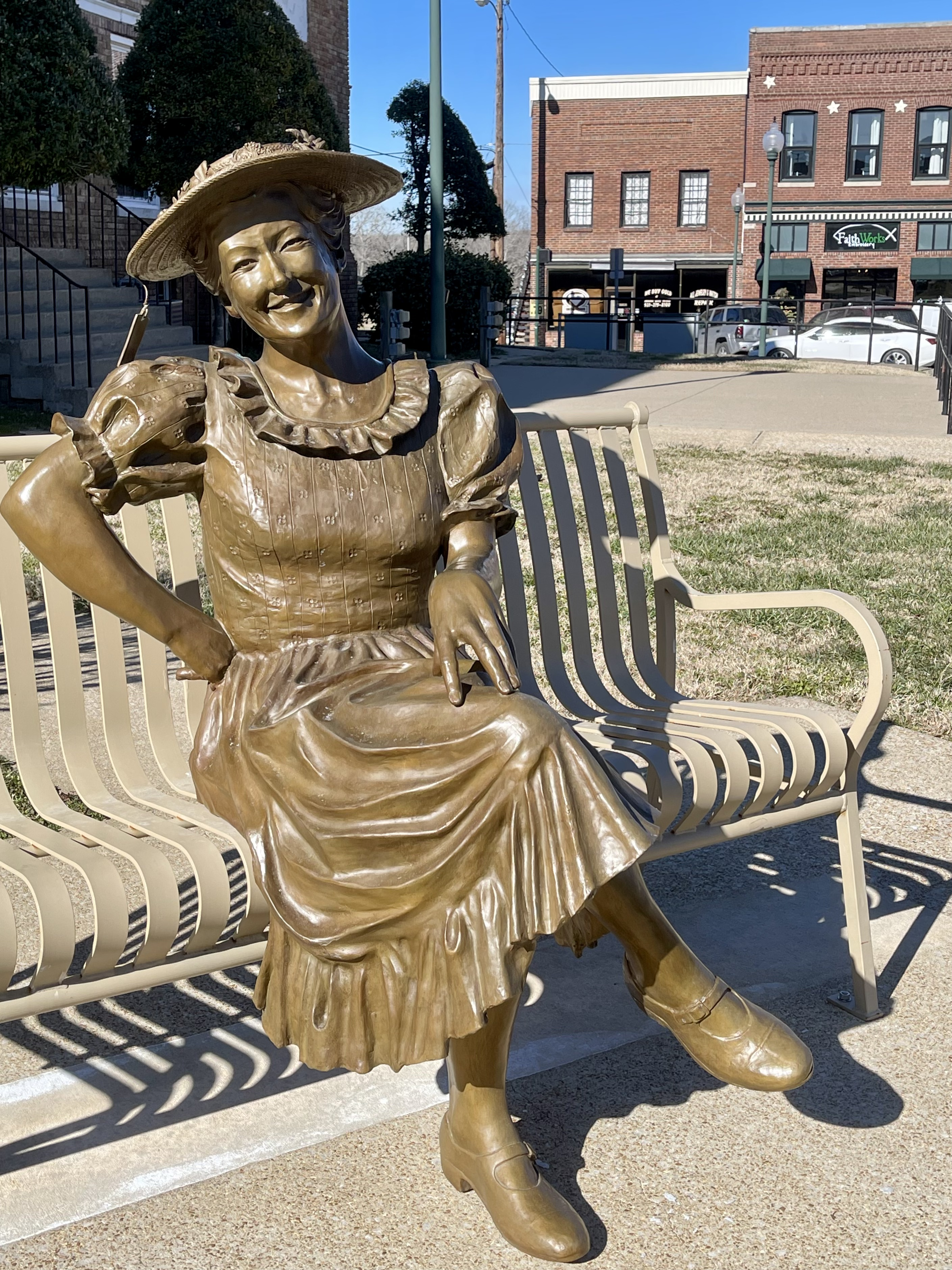
Sculpture of Minnie Pearl next to the courthouse by Jennifer Grisham

Centerville is a town in Hickman County, Tennessee, United States. The population was 3,532 as of the 2020 Census. It is the county seat and the only incorporated town in Hickman County. It is best known for being the hometown of American comedian Minnie Pearl.

== Geography ==
Centerville sits at the center of Hickman County in the valley of the Duck River, a west-flowing tributary of the Tennessee River. According to the United States Census Bureau, the town has a total area of 11.3 square miles (29.3 km^{2}), all land.

== Transportation ==
Tennessee State Route 100 is the main road running the length of the town. It leads northeast 55 miles (89 km) to Nashville, the state capital, and southwest 28 miles (45 km) to Linden. Tennessee State Route 50 passes through the southern part of Centerville, leading northwest 17 miles (27 km) to Interstate 40 (via exit 148) near Only and southeast 30 miles (48 km) to Columbia. The town limits extend north 5 miles (8 km) from the town center along SR 100 to the formerly unincorporated community of Fairfield, where State Route 48 leads northwest 15 miles (24 km) to Interstate 40 at Exit 163.

Centerville and Hickman County are served by Centerville Municipal Airport (IATA code GHM), a city-owned public-use airport located three miles (5 km) north of downtown.

== Demographics ==
Historical population
Census	Pop.	Note	%±
1860	251		—
1870	175		−30.3%
1880	287		64.0%
1890	498		73.5%
1910	1,097		—
1920	882		−19.6%
1930	943		6.9%
1940	1,030		9.2%
1950	1,532		48.7%
1960	1,678		9.5%
1970	2,592		54.5%
1980	2,824		9.0%
1990	3,616		28.0%
2000	3,793		4.9%
2010	3,644		−3.9%
2020	3,532		−3.1%

=== 2020 census ===
Centerville racial composition
Race	Number	Percentage
White (non-Hispanic)	3,173	89.84%
Black or African American (non-Hispanic)	122	3.45%
Native American	5	0.14%
Asian	3	0.08%
Other/Mixed	143	4.05%
Hispanic or Latino	86	2.43%

As of the 2020 census, Centerville had a population of 3,532. The median age was 44.9 years. 20.0% of residents were under the age of 18 and 25.3% of residents were 65 years of age or older. For every 100 females there were 90.1 males, and for every 100 females age 18 and over there were 87.7 males age 18 and over.

As of the 2020 census, 0.0% of residents lived in urban areas, while 100.0% lived in rural areas.

As of the 2020 census, there were 1,486 households in Centerville, including 832 family households, of which 28.5% had children under the age of 18 living in them. Of all households, 44.7% were married-couple households, 18.4% were households with a male householder and no spouse or partner present, and 31.3% were households with a female householder and no spouse or partner present. About 32.3% of all households were made up of individuals and 19.4% had someone living alone who was 65 years of age or older.

As of the 2020 census, there were 1,665 housing units, of which 10.8% were vacant. The homeowner vacancy rate was 2.4% and the rental vacancy rate was 5.5%.

=== 2000 census ===
As of the census of 2000, 3,793 people, 1,563 households, and 997 families were residing in the town. The population density was 348.4 inhabitants per square mile (134.5/km^{2}). The 1,688 housing units had an average density of 155.0 per square mile (59.8/km^{2}). The racial makeup of the town was 93.51% White, 4.77% African American, 0.37% Native American, 0.03% Asian, 0.24% from other races, and 1.08% from two or more races. Hispanics or Latinos of any race were 0.90% of the population.

Of the 1,563 households, 27.3% had children under 18 living with them, 48.3% were married couples living together, 11.8% had a female householder with no husband present, and 36.2% were not families. About 34.3% of all households were made up of individuals, and 19.4% had someone living alone who was 65 or older. The average household size was 2.28 and the average family size was 2.89.

In the town, the age distribution was 21.1% under 18, 7.6% from 18 to 24, 25.3% from 25 to 44, 23.3% from 45 to 64, and 22.7% who were 65 or older. The median age was 42 years. For every 100 females, there were 86.8 males. For every 100 females 18 and over, there were 80.3 males.

The median income for a household in the town was $24,824, and for a family was $35,448. Males had a median income of $29,693 versus $20,688 for females. The per capita income for the town was $14,947. About 15.1% of families and 20.7% of the population were below the poverty line, including 31.1% of those under 18 and 21.6% of those 65 or over.

== Government ==
Centerville is governed by a mayor, vice mayor, and a board of 10 aldermen. It uses a council-manager government. The mayor is elected to a four-year term. Each alderman represents one of five wards and is elected to a four-year term. Aldermen elections are staggered every two years, with one alderman from each ward being elected in each election. The vice mayor is selected from the board of aldermen.

The mayor as of 2022 was Gary Jacobs. The vice mayor was Derek Newsom.

== Notable people ==
Notable people who were born in Centerville or lived in the community include:

- Kevin Max, solo musician and founding member of DC Talk, briefly ran a bed and breakfast and recording studio in Centerville.
- Minnie Pearl (1912–1996), an American comedian, was born Sarah Ophelia Colley in Centerville.
- Del Reeves, country singer, died in Centerville in 2007.
- William K. Sebastian (1812–1865), a Centerville native, represented Arkansas in the United States Senate.
- Mike Smithson (1955–), Major League Baseball player, born Centerville.
- John Spence (1918–2013) was America's first "frogman". Born in Centerville.
- Dicky Wells (1907–1985), jazz trombonist. Born in Centerville.

== Climate ==
The climate in this area is characterized by hot, humid summers and generally mild to cool winters. According to the Köppen climate classification, Centerville has a humid subtropical climate, Cfa on climate maps.

== See also ==
- Grinder's Switch, Tennessee
