= Hickman County, Tennessee =

County in Tennessee, United States

- County
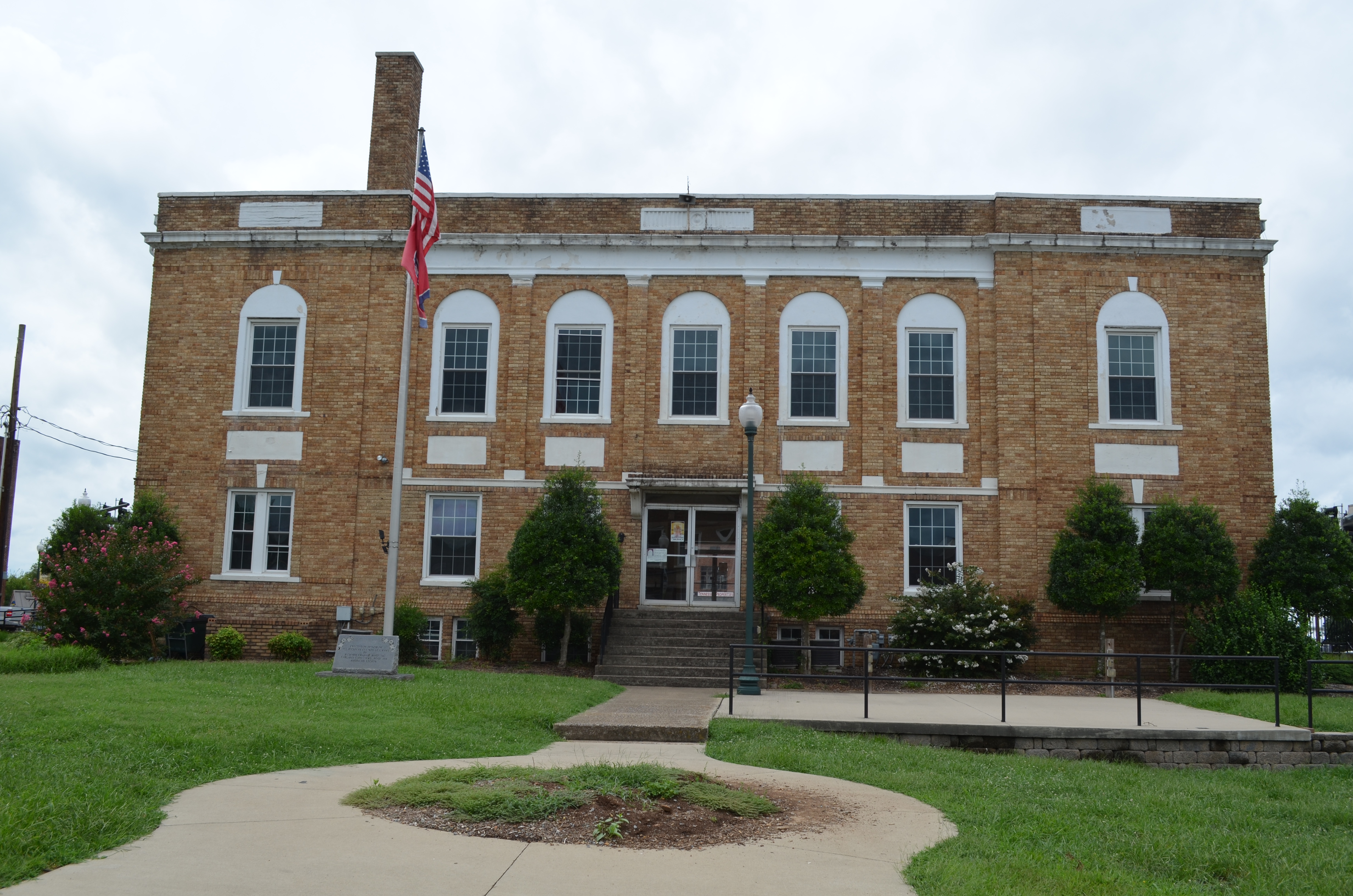
- Hickman County Courthouse in Centerville

- Location within the U.S. state of Tennessee
- Coordinates: 35.8013° N, 87.4604° W
- Country: United States
- State: Tennessee
- Founded: 1807
- Named for: Edwin Hickman, explorer
- Seat: Centerville
- Largest town: Centerville

Area
  - Total: 613 sq mi (1,590 km^{2})
  - Land: 612 sq mi (1,590 km^{2})
  - Water: 0.1 sq mi (0.26 km^{2}) 0.02%

Population (2020)
  - Total: 24,925
  - Estimate (2025): 26,219 ▲
  - Density: 40/sq mi (15/km^{2})
- Time zone: UTC−6 (Central)
  - Summer (DST): UTC−5 (CDT)
- ZIP Codes: 37033, 37098, 37025, 37137, 37097, 38487, 38454, 38476, 37140
- Area code: 931
- Congressional district: 7th
- Website: hickmancountytn.gov

Hickman County is a county located in the U.S. state of Tennessee. As of the 2020 Census, the population was 24,925. Its county seat is Centerville. As of 2023, Hickman County is part of the Nashville-Davidson–Murfreesboro–Franklin, TN Metropolitan Statistical Area, although it was once removed in 2018.

== History ==
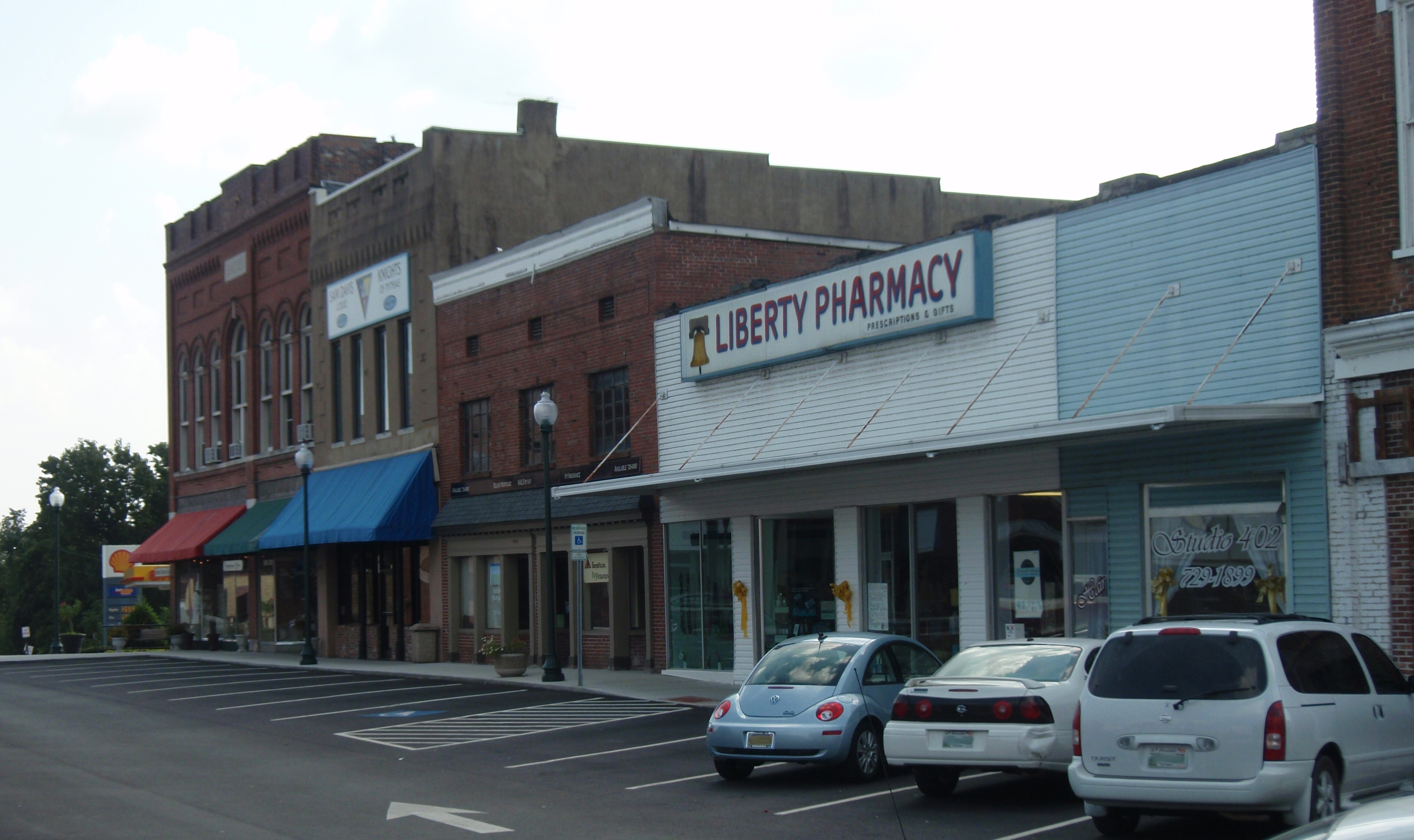
Town Square in Centerville in 2009

Hickman County was named for Edwin Hickman, an explorer and surveyor who was killed in an Indian attack at Defeated Creek in 1791.

The county was established in 1807, and named for Hickman at the suggestion of Robert Weakley, a legislator who had been a member of Hickman's surveying party. The original county was vast, extending to the southern border of the state. Hickman County was reduced in extent when it partially contributed to the formations of four counties: Wayne and Lawrence Counties in 1817, Perry County in 1819, and Lewis County in 1843.

Hickman and the Duck River valley was originally claimed by the Chickasaw people of West Tennessee and northern Mississippi. Among its first white settlers was John Gordon, the famous "Captain of the Spies" who later fought at Horseshoe Bend and at Pensacola under Andrew Jackson.

Gordon acquired land in Chickasaw territory in what is now Hickman County on the banks of the Duck River, where, in a partnership with Chief William "Chooshemataha" Colbert, he operated a ferry and Indian trading post for settlers traveling on the Natchez Trace.

The trace was a war-path later made into a federal road for settlers moving from Tennessee to the lower Mississippi territory. The Chickasaw ceded the land to Tennessee in 1805 and Gordon kept the estate, moving his family there in 1812 and eventually amassing a plantation of over 1500 acres. The Gordon House still stands by the Duck River today, now maintained by the Natchez Trace National Parkway. Throughout the 19th century, the county's industry revolved around iron furnaces, which made use of the county's natural supply of high-quality iron ore.

Early furnaces included Napier's furnace near Aetna, which was destroyed by Union soldiers during the Civil War, and furnaces built by the Standard Coal Company in the 1880s.

Hickman natives include songwriter Beth Slater Whitson and Grand Ole Opry personality Minnie Pearl. William F. Lyell, originally from Lyles, served as a corporal in the United States Army during the Korean War. He was posthumously awarded the Medal of Honor for his actions at the Battle of Bloody Ridge on August 31, 1951.

The county is the subject of the Johnny Cash song "Saturday Night In Hickman County", and the Hickman community of Grinder's Switch is indirectly mentioned in the song, "The South's Gonna Do It Again", by the Charlie Daniels Band (one line refers to the band Grinderswitch, and their song "Right On Time").

In 1939, Meriwether Lewis Electric Cooperative was chartered with its headquarters in Centerville.

On October 10, 2025, an explosion at the Accurate Energetic Systems explosives facility near the border with Humphreys County left sixteen people dead and at least four others injured.

== Geography ==
According to the U.S. Census Bureau, the county has a total area of 613 square miles (1,590 km^{2}), of which 612 square miles (1,590 km^{2}) is land and 0.1 square miles (0.26 km^{2}) (0.02%) is water. The Duck River, the Piney River, and many creeks, large and small, including Cave Branch, run through Hickman County.

=== Adjacent counties ===
- Dickson County (north)
- Williamson County (east)
- Maury County (southeast)
- Lewis County (south)
- Perry County (west)
- Humphreys County (northwest)

=== National protected area ===
- Natchez Trace Parkway (part)

=== State protected areas ===
- Beaver Dam Creek Wildlife Management Area
- MTSU Wildlife Management Area
- John Noel State Natural Area

=== Waterways ===
- Duck River
- Piney River
- Panther Branch
- Buck Branch
- Copperas Branch
- Big Swan Creek
- Plunders Creek

== Demographics ==
Historical population
Census	Pop.	Note	%±
1810	2,583		—
1820	6,080		135.4%
1830	8,119		33.5%
1840	8,618		6.1%
1850	9,397		9.0%
1860	9,312		−0.9%
1870	9,856		5.8%
1880	12,095		22.7%
1890	14,499		19.9%
1900	16,367		12.9%
1910	16,527		1.0%
1920	16,216		−1.9%
1930	13,613		−16.1%
1940	14,873		9.3%
1950	13,353		−10.2%
1960	11,862		−11.2%
1970	12,096		2.0%
1980	15,151		25.3%
1990	16,754		10.6%
2000	22,295		33.1%
2010	24,690		10.7%
2020	24,925		1.0%
2025 (est.)	26,219	▲	5.2%
U.S. Decennial Census; 1790–1960 1900–1990; 1990–2000 2010–2014

=== Racial and ethnic composition ===
Hickman County, Tennessee – Racial and ethnic composition Note: the US Census treats Hispanic/Latino as an ethnic category. This table excludes Latinos from the racial categories and assigns them to a separate category. Hispanics/Latinos may be of any race.
Race / ethnicity (NH = Non-Hispanic)	Pop 1980	Pop 1990	Pop 2000	Pop 2010	Pop 2020	% 1980	% 1990	% 2000	% 2010	% 2020
White alone (NH)	14,257	15,781	20,761	22,657	22,086	94.10%	94.19%	93.12%	91.77%	88.61%
Black or African American alone (NH)	812	858	1,007	1,102	931	5.36%	5.12%	4.52%	4.46%	3.74%
Native American or Alaska Native alone (NH)	15	38	98	118	101	0.10%	0.23%	0.44%	0.48%	0.41%
Asian alone (NH)	0	8	16	47	72	0.00%	0.05%	0.07%	0.19%	0.29%
Native Hawaiian or Pacific Islander alone (NH)	x	x	2	2	1	x	x	0.01%	0.01%	0.00%
Other race alone (NH)	0	2	8	16	53	0.00%	0.01%	0.04%	0.06%	0.21%
Mixed race or Multiracial (NH)	x	x	181	293	1,000	x	x	0.81%	1.19%	4.01%
Hispanic or Latino (any race)	67	67	222	455	681	0.44%	0.40%	1.00%	1.84%	2.73%
Total	15,151	16,754	22,295	24,690	24,925	100.00%	100.00%	100.00%	100.00%	100.00%

=== 2020 census ===
As of the 2020 census, there were 24,925 people and 5,611 families residing in the county; the median age was 42.2 years, with 20.8% of residents under the age of 18 and 17.8% of residents 65 years of age or older.

For every 100 females there were 111.7 males, and for every 100 females age 18 and over there were 111.5 males age 18 and over.

The racial makeup of the county was 89.7% White, 3.8% Black or African American, 0.5% American Indian and Alaska Native, 0.3% Asian, <0.1% Native Hawaiian and Pacific Islander, 1.1% from some other race, and 4.6% from two or more races. Hispanic or Latino residents of any race comprised 2.7% of the population.

<0.1% of residents lived in urban areas, while 100.0% lived in rural areas.

There were 9,237 households in the county, of which 29.2% had children under the age of 18 living in them. Of all households, 49.2% were married-couple households, 19.0% were households with a male householder and no spouse or partner present, and 23.8% were households with a female householder and no spouse or partner present. About 26.0% of all households were made up of individuals and 12.2% had someone living alone who was 65 years of age or older.

There were 10,457 housing units, of which 11.7% were vacant. Among occupied housing units, 76.9% were owner-occupied and 23.1% were renter-occupied. The homeowner vacancy rate was 1.3% and the rental vacancy rate was 6.1%.

=== 2000 census ===
As of the census of 2000, there were 22,295 people, 8,081 households, and 5,955 families residing in the county. The population density was 36 people per square mile (14 people/km^{2}). There were 8,904 housing units at an average density of 14 units per square mile (5.4/km^{2}). The racial makeup of the county was 93.71% White, 4.53% Black or African American, 0.48% Native American, 0.08% Asian, 0.01% Pacific Islander, 0.29% from other races, and 0.90% from two or more races. 1.00% of the population were Hispanic or Latino of any race.

There were 8,081 households, out of which 33.90% had children under the age of 18 living with them, 59.40% were married couples living together, 9.60% had a female householder with no husband present, and 26.30% were non-families. 22.60% of all households were made up of individuals, and 9.90% had someone living alone who was 65 years of age or older. The average household size was 2.59 and the average family size was 3.02.

In the county, the population was spread out, with 24.70% under the age of 18, 8.50% from 18 to 24, 31.00% from 25 to 44, 23.80% from 45 to 64, and 12.00% who were 65 years of age or older. The median age was 36 years. For every 100 females, there were 112.50 males. For every 100 females age 18 and over, there were 111.50 males.

The median income for a household in the county was $31,013, and the median income for a family was $36,342. Males had a median income of $29,411 versus $21,185 for females. The per capita income for the county was $14,446. About 11.60% of families and 14.30% of the population were below the poverty line, including 15.90% of those under age 18 and 18.40% of those age 65 or over.

== Communities ==
=== Town ===
- Centerville

=== Census-designated places ===
- Bon Aqua Junction
- Lyles
- Wrigley

=== Unincorporated communities ===
- Aetna
- Bon Aqua
- Bond
- Bucksnort
- Buffalo
- Goodrich
- Grinder's Switch
- Littlelot
- Nunnelly
- Only
- Pleasantville
- Primm Springs
- Shady Grove
- Swan Bluff
- Whitfield

== Politics ==
Hickman County was long a Democratic stronghold, in line with much of Middle Tennessee. The county began shifting Republican in the mid-2000s, narrowly voting for George W. Bush in 2004, the first time it had supported a Republican presidential candidate since Richard Nixon's 49-state landslide in 1972. Since then, Hickman County has become reliably Republican in elections. In 2024, Donald Trump became the first Republican nominee to receive over 80 percent of the county's vote.

United States presidential election results for Hickman County, Tennessee
Year	Republican		Democratic		Third party(ies)	
Year	No.	%	No.	%	No.	%
1836	149	19.35%	621	80.65%	0	0.00%
1840	293	23.53%	952	76.47%	0	0.00%
1844	255	19.78%	1,034	80.22%	0	0.00%
1848	301	23.35%	988	76.65%	0	0.00%
1852	241	22.31%	839	77.69%	0	0.00%
1856	0	0.00%	1,086	82.02%	238	17.98%
1860	0	0.00%	16	1.18%	1,340	98.82%
1868	97	48.26%	104	51.74%	0	0.00%
1872	235	20.87%	891	79.13%	0	0.00%
1876	179	12.33%	1,273	87.67%	0	0.00%
1880	392	24.33%	1,157	71.82%	62	3.85%
1884	709	37.87%	1,135	60.63%	28	1.50%
1888	1,187	43.45%	1,509	55.23%	36	1.32%
1892	554	27.02%	1,179	57.51%	317	15.46%
1896	988	38.50%	1,553	60.52%	25	0.97%
1900	894	40.29%	1,292	58.22%	33	1.49%
1904	922	41.64%	1,231	55.60%	61	2.76%
1908	1,065	44.88%	1,285	54.15%	23	0.97%
1912	868	38.07%	1,288	56.49%	124	5.44%
1916	1,026	40.55%	1,479	58.46%	25	0.99%
1920	1,470	51.63%	1,362	47.84%	15	0.53%
1924	315	25.04%	922	73.29%	21	1.67%
1928	510	32.95%	1,038	67.05%	0	0.00%
1932	385	17.46%	1,812	82.18%	8	0.36%
1936	353	16.30%	1,804	83.33%	8	0.37%
1940	644	18.75%	2,776	80.84%	14	0.41%
1944	618	21.71%	2,223	78.11%	5	0.18%
1948	478	16.61%	2,140	74.36%	260	9.03%
1952	1,044	28.38%	2,625	71.35%	10	0.27%
1956	1,040	29.75%	2,439	69.77%	17	0.49%
1960	1,224	33.20%	2,401	65.12%	62	1.68%
1964	1,019	26.16%	2,877	73.84%	0	0.00%
1968	760	17.33%	1,152	26.27%	2,473	56.40%
1972	1,943	56.06%	1,393	40.19%	130	3.75%
1976	1,154	24.11%	3,590	74.99%	43	0.90%
1980	1,903	36.39%	3,225	61.66%	102	1.95%
1984	2,370	44.43%	2,941	55.14%	23	0.43%
1988	2,246	45.67%	2,643	53.74%	29	0.59%
1992	1,820	27.06%	4,093	60.84%	814	12.10%
1996	2,002	31.19%	3,917	61.03%	499	7.78%
2000	2,914	40.12%	4,239	58.36%	111	1.53%
2004	4,359	50.26%	4,263	49.15%	51	0.59%
2008	4,784	56.30%	3,563	41.93%	151	1.78%
2012	4,758	62.59%	2,698	35.49%	146	1.92%
2016	5,695	72.89%	1,824	23.35%	294	3.76%
2020	7,577	77.06%	2,130	21.66%	125	1.27%
2024	8,265	80.17%	1,968	19.09%	76	0.74%

== See also ==
- National Register of Historic Places listings in Hickman County, Tennessee
