= Tullahoma–Manchester micropolitan area =

Tullahoma–Manchester Micropolitan Area
- Micropolitan Statistical Area
- Tullahoma–Manchester, TN; Micropolitan Statistical Area
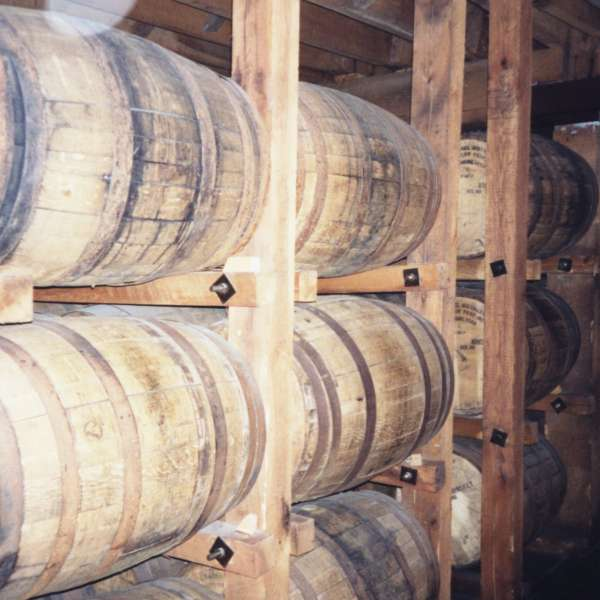
- Whiskey being aged at Jack Daniel's Distillery in Lynchburg
Map of Tullahoma–Manchester, TN μSA
City of Tullahoma
City of Manchester
Tullahoma–Manchester, TN μSA
Other Components of the Nashville CSA
- Country: United States
- State: Tennessee
- Largest city: Tullahoma
- Other cities: Manchester; Lynchburg; New Union (CDP)

Area
  - Total: 1,140 sq mi (3,000 km^{2})
  - Land: 1,113 sq mi (2,880 km^{2})
  - Water: 28 sq mi (73 km^{2})

Population (2020)
  - Total: 64,350
  - Density: 89/sq mi (34/km^{2})
- Time zone: UTC-6 (CST)
  - Summer (DST): UTC-5 (CDT)
- Area code: 931

The Tullahoma–Manchester Micropolitan Statistical Area, as defined by the United States Census Bureau, is an area consisting of two counties in central Tennessee, anchored by the cities of Tullahoma and Manchester.

As of the 2000 census, the μSA had a population of 93,024 (though a July 1, 2009, estimate placed the population at 99,927).

The Micropolitan area formerly included Franklin County until it was removed in 2023 to form the Winchester Micropolitan Statistical Area.

== Counties ==
- Coffee
- Moore

== Communities ==
=== Places with 10,000 to 21,000 inhabitants ===
- Manchester (county seat)
- Tullahoma (partial)

=== Places with 1,000 to 10,000 inhabitants ===
- Lynchburg (county seat)
- New Union (census-designated place)

=== Places with less than 1,000 inhabitants ===
- Hillsboro (census-designated place)
- Lakewood Park (census-designated place)

=== Unincorporated communities ===
- Beech Grove
- Belmont
- Blanton's Chapel
- Farrar Hill
- Fredonia
- Fudgearound
- Noah
- Pocahontas
- Shady Grove
- Summitville

== Demographics ==
As of the 2000 census, there were 93,024 people, 36,099 households, and 26,445 families residing within the μSA. The racial makeup of the μSA was 93.06% White, 4.34% African American, 0.25% Native American, 0.56% Asian, 0.03% Pacific Islander, 0.76% from other races, and 1.00% from two or more races. Hispanic or Latino of any race were 1.84% of the population.

The median income for a household in the μSA was $35,844, and the median income for a family was $41,330. Males had a median income of $31,932 versus $21,160 for females. The per capita income for the μSA was $18,388.

== See also ==
- Tennessee statistical areas
