= National Register of Historic Places listings in Coffee County, Tennessee =

Location of Coffee County in Tennessee

This is a list of the National Register of Historic Places listings in Coffee County, Tennessee.

This is intended to be a complete list of the properties and districts on the National Register of Historic Places in Coffee County, Tennessee, United States. Latitude and longitude coordinates are provided for many National Register properties and districts; these locations may be seen together in a map.

There are 16 properties and districts listed on the National Register in the county, and one former listing.

Contents: Counties in Tennessee
Anderson – Bedford – Benton – Bledsoe – Blount – Bradley – Campbell – Cannon – Carroll – Carter – Cheatham – Chester – Claiborne – Clay – Cocke – Coffee – Crockett – Cumberland – Davidson – Decatur – DeKalb – Dickson – Dyer – Fayette – Fentress – Franklin – Gibson – Giles – Grainger – Greene – Grundy – Hamblen – Hamilton – Hancock – Hardeman – Hardin – Hawkins – Haywood – Henderson – Henry – Hickman – Houston – Humphreys – Jackson – Jefferson – Johnson – Knox – Lake – Lauderdale – Lawrence – Lewis – Lincoln – Loudon – Macon – Madison – Marion – Marshall – Maury – McMinn – McNairy – Meigs – Monroe – Montgomery – Moore – Morgan – Obion – Overton – Perry – Pickett – Polk – Putnam – Rhea – Roane – Robertson – Rutherford – Scott – Sequatchie – Sevier – Shelby – Smith – Stewart – Sullivan – Sumner – Tipton – Trousdale – Unicoi – Union – Van Buren – Warren – Washington – Wayne – Weakley – White – Williamson – Wilson

This National Park Service list is complete through NPS recent listings posted March 14, 2025.

== Current listings ==
	Name on the Register	Image	Date listed	Location	City or town	Description
1	Cascade Distillery Site	Cascade Distillery Site	June 10, 1994 (#94000578)	Western side of Cascade Dr., about 0.7 miles northwest of the junction with Riley Creek Rd. 35°25′14″N 86°14′21″W	Normandy	The original site of the George Dickel distillery, the current site of which lies just to the north
2	Coffee County Courthouse	Coffee County Courthouse	February 12, 1974 (#74001905)	Public Sq. 35°28′59″N 86°05′20″W	Manchester	Built in 1871
3	Crouch-Ramsey Family Farm	Crouch-Ramsey Family Farm	August 5, 2005 (#05000830)	3016 Hickory Grove Rd. 35°32′41″N 85°57′28″W	Summitville	Tennessee Century Farm established by Thomas Cunningham in 1901; house and log barn date to the 19th century
4	Farrar Distillery		September 27, 1984 (#84003472)	Noah Fork Rd. 35°34′50″N 86°10′18″W	Noah	
5	Fox House	Fox House	June 21, 2023 (#100009078)	502 Lake Hills Rd. 35°24′36″N 86°12′04″W	Tullahoma	
6	L.D. Hickerson House	L.D. Hickerson House	August 18, 1993 (#89001395)	215 N. Washington St. 35°21′56″N 86°12′36″W	Tullahoma	Built in 1895 by Lytle David Hickerson
7	John H. Leming House	John H. Leming House	March 21, 2011 (#11000092)	414 E. Main St. 35°28′56″N 86°04′59″W	Manchester	Built by John Leming in 1899
8	Normandy Dam Project	Normandy Dam Project	August 11, 2017 (#100001464)	Frank Hiles Rd. E of Coffee-Bedford County Line; 35°27′56″N 86°14′33″W	Normandy	
9	North Atlantic Street Historic District	North Atlantic Street Historic District	July 14, 1988 (#88001052)	200-500 blocks of N. Atlantic St. 35°21′58″N 86°12′43″W	Tullahoma	Victorian houses built in the late 19th century for merchants and railroad managers
10	North Washington Street Historic District	North Washington Street Historic District	August 18, 1993 (#89001396)	603-611 N. Washington St. 35°22′12″N 86°12′50″W	Tullahoma	1920s-era cottages built for railroad workers
11	Old Stone Fort	Old Stone Fort	February 20, 1973 (#73001757)	West of Manchester; 35°28′59″N 86°06′29″W	Manchester	
12	Smotherman House	Smotherman House	July 25, 2018 (#100002747)	211 W Blackwell St. 35°21′59″N 86°13′00″W	Tullahoma	
13	T-201 Aircraft Hangar	T-201 Aircraft Hangar	June 28, 2021 (#100006711)	707 William Northern Blvd. (Tullahoma Regional Airport); 35°22′49″N 86°14′27″W	Tullahoma	
14	Tullahoma Municipal Building	Tullahoma Municipal Building	July 30, 2018 (#100002748)	201 W Grundy St. 35°21′45″N 86°12′45″W	Tullahoma	
15	Wilkinson-Keele House	Wilkinson-Keele House	November 15, 2006 (#06001040)	313 S. Ramsey St. 35°28′55″N 86°05′03″W	Manchester	Built in 1888
16	Wilson-Crouch House	Wilson-Crouch House	November 20, 2017 (#100001820)	216 S. Jackson St. 35°21′35″N 86°12′34″W	Tullahoma	

== Former listings ==
	Name on the Register	Image	Date listed	Date removed	Location	City or town	Description
1	Manchester Cumberland Presbyterian Church		June 29, 1992 (#92000781)	October 28, 2021	Junction of Church and W. High Sts. 35°29′04″N 86°05′26″W	Manchester	

== See also ==
- List of National Historic Landmarks in Tennessee
- National Register of Historic Places listings in Tennessee
