= Normandy Archaeological Project =

The Normandy Archaeological Project was a rescue excavation designed to preserve the archaeological history of the area before it became submerged by the construction of the Normandy Reservoir Dam through funding from the Tennessee Valley Authority. After the construction of the dam, historic information about that area could not be accessed, so prior to the construction of the dam, as much research as possible had to be done on the area. This salvage effort was conducted in the Duck River Valley area, of middle Tennessee from March 1971 until the summer of 1975, prior to the completion of the dam in 1976. The fieldwork was done mainly by researchers from the University of Tennessee, Knoxville, under contract to the Tennessee Valley Authority Contract and National Park. The dam creating the Normandy Reservoir was built on the Duck River at mile marker 248.6 in Coffee and Bedford County, Tennessee, named after the town of Normandy, Tennessee. The two nearest cities are Manchester and Tullahoma.

Large excavation projects need time for full evaluation of the project area in order to determine the relationship of the findings and obtain usable information through focusing on the hypothesis. In this way a wide view of the area and the time space within it was obtained. This large project also allowed a rare opportunity for young archaeologists to receive field training on a site soon to become forever inaccessible. The fieldwork on the Normandy project began with an investigation of surface collections to ascertain the intensity of prehistoric occupation in this portion of the valley. The sites were then mapped, with assistance from local collectors and the Coffee-Franklin County Chapter of the Tennessee Archaeological Society. Eighty three archaeological sites were found in the general project area twenty eight of which were determined to be out of the range of the maximum pool stage of the reservoir although still in danger of damage from development. Sixty-nine of the sites had previously been discovered prior to the excavations in the reservoir. Thirty of these sites were found by members of the Coffee-Franklin County Chapter of the Tennessee Archaeological Society. Although previous sites had been surveyed, the surrounding uplands were most often not included. Those typological areas are included in this project in an attempt to gain a better analysis of the patterns of culture and history of the ancient peoples of the Duck Valley.

== History ==
=== Prehistoric environment ===
The Upper Duck Valley lies between the Highland Rim and the Nashville Basin in central Tennessee. The valley floor of the area lies in the basin while the rim of the valley is the highland. The Normandy Reservoir was to be built over these landscape formations. Each of these two areas were segmented into four different environmental zones; The floodplain, older alluvial terrace, valley slopes and bluffs, and uplands. Previous studies and information indicated large prehistoric sites were present in this area. The subtropical climate of the area is characterized by hot summers and mild winters with the most rainfall occurring during the winter and spring, creating heavy stream flow in the Duck River from November to May.

The project area has four bio geographic zones: Flood Plain Zone, Older Alluvial Terrace Zone, Valley Slopes and Bluff Zone, and the Upland Zone. Each zone has varying vegetation and flood patterns. Since prehistoric settlement in the area was determined, in part, by the availability of natural resources it was assumed that by examining the sites and materials found in each zone one could determine habitation and subsistence patterns in the Duck Valley area for the native inhabitants. Major occupations were found spanning the period from the Late Archaic, through the Mississippian periods. Many of the earlier sites, dating to the late Pleistocene/early Holocene, were covered by later occupations. During the Middle Archaic period (c. 4000-6000 BC), larger sites appeared, with locations again guided by environmental factors, as was the case throughout prehistory.

== Agriculture and resources ==
=== Lithic resources ===
Lithics found in the greatest abundance in the Duck Valley included: cryptocrystalline quartz, blue-grey and tan chert, gray banded chert, fossiliferous chert, limestone, shale, mudstone, siltstone, and sandstone. Large quantities of chert artifacts were found indicating the importance of chert as a resource for tool making.

Some lithic resources found in the reservoir are thought to have been derived locally, although there were also exotic materials present. These were most likely obtained through trade with peoples in the surrounding region. Some of the exotic materials included: cryptocrystalline quartz, blue-green nodular chert, Dover chert, novaculite, quartz, vein quartz, chalcedony, Horse Mountain agate, sandstone, hematite, steatite, slate, green slate, banded slate and igneous rock. These materials are, in some cases long distances from their source. Some came from as far away as the Great Lakes. This suggests that the groups of the upper Duck Valley were not secluded, but were instead active participants in established trade with other distant groups. The amount of lithic material suggests repeated use of the area over time, and was most frequently used during the Early Archaic and Late Archaic/Early Woodland periods.

Escalation of increased contact with other groups throughout the Mid-South is suggested by the occurrence of steatite and Dover chert at the Banks I and Banks II sites indicating inter-regional trade in the Upper Duck Valley by 1000 BC.

The project was reported in a number of volumes written by Dr. Charles Faulkner and Major C.R. McCollough, the project directors.

=== Faunal resources ===
The prehistoric Indians of the Duck Valley region could have utilized the rich faunal resources available. There are at least three hundred and three vertebrates, excluding fish, which were available. Mollusk species, many still present in the Duck River today, could have also been integrated into their subsistence system. One hundred seven species of fish were available in the Duck River. Turtles, alligators, turkey, owls, quail, waterfowl, deer, raccoon, gray fox, red fox, mink, muskrat, woodchuck, squirrel, opossum, eastern cottontail, and otter are some of the primary animal species available. Some large mammals that were without doubt utilized by these populations included elk, mountain lion, black bear, gray wolf, white-tailed deer, and bison. The white-tail remained as the most commonly used source of meat and very constant in the diet of the Duck River Valley inhabitants.

=== Floral resources ===
The Duck Valley is a transitional zone between the Western and Mixed Mesophytic forests of the highland rim and Nashville Basin. The inhabitants of this area would have had ample natural resources at their disposal. The plant resources available in this region are closely tied to soil topography and climate. The types of plant resources dominant in the Nashville Basin are as follows:

- Liriodendron tulipifera (tuliptree)
- Fagus grandifolia (beech)
- Tilia heterophylla (white basswood)
- Aesculus octandra (yellow buckeye)
- Acer saccharum (sugar maple)
- Castanea dentata (American chestnut)
- Quercus alba (white oak)
- Quercus rubra (northern red oak)
- Quercus muehlenbergii (chinkapin oak)
- Magnolia acuminata (cucumber tree)
- Fraxinus americana (white ash)
- Acer rubrum (red maple)
- Carya ovata (shagbark)
- Carya cordiformis (bitternut)
- Nyssa sylvatica (blackgum)
- Prunus serotina (black cherry)

== Zones ==
=== Archaeological sites in the Flood Plain Zone ===
Along the river, waterfowl, birds, fish, turtles, aquatic mammals and mollusk could all be utilized. Spring, early summer, late summer, and early fall would have been the most productive time for exploiting the resources of this region. Although resources may have been sparse in the winter months food would have still been available because of the variety of wildlife in this zone. Five sites have been recorded in this zone Although artifacts were found in this zone no well defined early assemblages were recovered. The rich biodiversity, fertile soil and available lithic resources made this area perhaps the most attractive zone to prehistoric inhabitants.

- Eoff III Site 40CF107.
- Boyd II Site 40CF72
- Blanton Site 40CF38
- Anthony Site II 40CF104
- Ewell III Site 40CF118

=== Archaeological sites in the Older Alluvial Terrace Zone ===
The large number of sites (n-64) found at the older alluvial terrace is due to the topography of the area, since there were not many animal resources available in this zone. In the closed canopy the only mammal that would find this zone attractive would be the raccoon. Spring would be the most productive time for this zone.

- Leming Site 40BD30
- Normandy Bridge Site 40BD 75
- Hendrixon site 40BC47
- Barton Site 40CF102
- Banks I Site 40CF34
- Banks II Site 40CF113
- Banks III Site 40CF108
- Banks IV Site 40CF110
- Banks V Site 40CF111
- Banks VI Site 40CF112
- Aaron Shelton Site 40CF69
- Boyd Branch I Site 40CF76
- Boyd Branch II Site 40CF77
- Jernigan II Site 40CF37
- Jernigan I Site 40CF36
- Ferrell I Site 40CF101
- Ferrell II Site 40CF100
- Duke I Site 40CF97
- Duke II Site 40CF98
- Duke III Site 40CF99
- Parks Site 40CF5
- Sterling Shelton Site 40CF73
- Nowlin I Site40CF75
- Nowlin II Site 40CF35
- Davidson Branch Site 40CF74
- Hicks II Site 40CF117
- Hicks I Site 40CF62
- Hicks II Site 40CF117
- Neel IV Site 40CF70
- Neel V Site 40CF 109
- Eoff II Site 40CF78
- Eoff I Site 40CF32
- Eoff IV Site 40CF119
- Richardson-Soesbe Site 40CF88
- Pythias Site 40CF6
- Neel II Site 40CF40
- Neel I Site 40CF39
- Sandy Acre Site 40CF61
- Wiser I Site 40CF80
- Wiser II Site 40CF87
- Wiser III Site 40CF86
- Boyd IV Site 40CF85
- Boyd I Site 40CF68
- Boyd III Site 40CF71
- Wiser-Stephens II Site 40CF84
- Wiser-Stephens I Site 40CF81
- Blanton II Site 40CF83
- Ewell III Site 40CF118
- Ewell II Site 40CF50
- Riddle Site 40CF59
- Casteel South Site 40CF63
- Casteel IV Site 40CF64
- Hale Branch Site 40CF53
- Powers Bridge Site 40CF54
- Hickerson Site 40CF2
- Powers I Site 40CF43
- Powers II Site 40CF42
- McFarland Site 40CF48
- McFarland East Site 40CF49
- McFarland West Site 40CF47
- Powers V Site 40CF4
- Wilkinson Site 40CF52
- York Site 40CF105
- Powers IV Site 40CF3

=== Archaeological sites in the Valley Slopes and Bluff Zone ===
Spring, late summer, early summer, and fall would be the time of maximum productivity in this area. Only two sites documented in these zones.

- Shelton Quarry Site 40BD80
- Rhoton Cave Site 40CF46

=== Archaeological sites in the Upland Zone ===
Late summer, early fall and fall would be a productive time for this region. Fourteen sites were found at this zone.

- Neel III Site 40CF79
- Partin Site 40CF114
- Blanton III Site 40CF82
- Anthony I Site 40CF103
- Ewell I Site 40CF60
- Casteel III Site 40CF67
- Casteel II Site 740CF66
- Casteel I Site 40CF65
- Powers III Site 40CF7
- Old Stone Fort Site 40CF1
- Chumbley Site 40CF58
- Ray Site 40CF41
- McCormick I Site 40CF44
- McCormick II Site 40CF45
- Later discovered sites: Shelton Quarry 40BD80, Eoff IV 40CF119

== Archaeology ==
=== Survey of the Normandy Reservoir ===
The fieldwork in Normandy project began with an investigation of surface collections to ascertain the intensity of prehistoric occupation in this portion of the valley. The excavation was to take place between the years of 1971 to 1976. Each season would provide segmenting markers for the excavation. A volume of work was published following each complete seasonal cycle including some additional publications. The area of the Normandy project was naturally divided into two areas. The Upper Rim and the Nashville Basin, both of which were divided again for the purpose of the project, into four areas: the floodplain zone, older alluvial terrace, valley slopes, and uplands. The dam's scheduled construction was to begin in 1976. Under this time constraint for such a large project, the project had to proceed efficiently. This is the planned and executed layout of the excavations that went underway including the most noted or distinguished sites. The course of action was to follow these steps:

- Assess the reservoir and obtain assistance from the Coffee County Chapter of the Tennessee Archaeological Society.
- Investigate and experiment the area under planned inundation.
- Using the collected data to submit a proposal to request for funding from the Tennessee Valley Authority and National Park Service.
- Publish the first tome which would including a description of the natural area of the reservoir, a description of the system of type classification, and a description of the primary inspection of the reservoir.
- Devise a blueprint to mapping out the excavation and testing methods in efforts to answer the question of, what were the cultural, agricultural, cultivation, and population development patterns of the Duck River Valley inhabitants.
- Continue to print a tome in correspondence with each passing investigation season spent in the basin.

=== Excavation sites of interest ===
Phase I: 1971-1972

During this time, one-hundred and sixty eight sites were discovered with a total of two-hundred and forty five identifiable components. It is possible for a single site to have more than one component. The cultural phases associated with the components were determined by identifying the projectile points and ceramics associated with the component. These components are uncovered in phase I mainly by removal of the plow zone in search of features that may require further excavation. The component's phases identified as following: six Paleo-Indian/Clovis, ten Transitional Paleo-Archaic/Dalton/Big Sandy, seventeen Middle Archaic, twenty four Terminal Archaic/Wade, six Early Woodland/ Watts Bar/ Long Branch, forty Middle Woodland, sixteen late Woodland, ten Woodland, four Mississippian, and four late-eighteenth-to-nineteenth-century Euro-American sites.

- Barton: Testing was done on a Cartesian grid with 5x5 units. This was done in order to gather a more comprehensive report on stratigraphy and concentration of features on the phase I sites. An encountered midden was excavated in .5-foot levels until the subsoil was contacted.
- Banks III: A widespread midden was recovered and further excavated through block stripping and the removal of the plow zone. Following this and the mechanical removal of the plow zone, the site was intensively excavated by hand. Middle Woodland Owl Hollow –phase summer and winter houses were recovered.
- Eoff I: A Woodland midden was discovered on this site as well with recommendations of further block excavation.
- Eoff III: In the Floodplain zone, this was the only intensively occupied site. There were a quantity of Middle Archaic projectile points.
- Hicks Site: Elements of the Late Archaic Ledbetter phase were recovered and recommended for further study.
- Nowlin II: There was evidence of the Terminal Archaic Wade at this site which included a burial and several features.
- Banks V: An Extensive and preserved midden was recovered and removed through controlled surface collection and plow zone removal. This was done using a smooth-bladed Tournapull pan to create a cruciform pattern of trenches to remove the plow zone.
- Rhoton Cave: After removal of surface rock fall, excavation revealed an excellently preserved stratification of Woodland components with tremendous faunal preservation.

Phase II: 1972-1973

This phase began in 1973 following the phase II, tested four large sites; Riddle, Boyd II, Wiser-Stephens, and Anthony II.. During this phase two sites with indication of heavy occupation were recovered.

- Jernigan II: This site was very large, covering 2 acres, it was separated into seven areas for testing and controlled surface collection before excavation could commence. Frequent Ledbetter phase features, occasional midden deposits and atypical shaft-and-chamber burial dated to the Mason –phase, and characterized this large site.
- Body II: A site with evidence of significant occupation and one of the largest in the upper reservoir zone with recommendation for further excavation.

Wiser-Stephens: Dating reveals this site to be associated with the Late Archaic period and Late Woodland period with greater occupation during the Late Woodland.

- Ewell III: An upper reservoir site which also happened to be one of the largest.

Phase III: 1973-1974

In the following spring, summer and fall of 1973, phase III progressed.

- Hicks I: A 5x70 foot trench was dug through the archaic midden. Four levels were excavated and found to contain Ledbetter-phase basin hearths.
- Eoff I: This site was split into two areas. On the north side was area A which was excavated with a large block. This revealed a Neal-phase occupation. A trench with a depth of two feet below the plow zone was placed through a stratified earth midden includes mostly Mason-phase components. Area B contained a 5x90 foot trench that was later converted into 20 10x10 foot unit blocks. Ledbetter, Wade, and McFarland phases were represented amongst the seventeen features that were recovered within this site. An unusually large and intensively deep stratified conical pit was recovered, but so massive that the entirety of its expansion could not be determined. The artifacts connected with it suggested it was an ancient spring that had been packed in.
- Eoff III: This site on the floodplain lies adjacent to Eoff I site. Middle Archaic components radiocarbon dating to 4575 BC +\- 165 were found here making it the earliest site surveyed in the reservoir although no proof of human inhabitation was recovered beneath the plow zone.
- Banks V: Evidence of human occupation was implied by an Owl Howl winter house discovered. Total removal of the plow zone revealed many other features, most of which were in relation to this winter house. This site received the dedication of an entire volume from the Normandy collection. Ceramic analysis implies close association of this site with the Langston culture of northern Alabama.
- Nowlin II: The Wright State University field school excavated this site under the direction of Bennie C. Keel
- Ewell III: This site underwent further investigation, which involved stripping the alluvial terrace. This revealed Wade, McFarland, and Mason phase community patterns.
- Jernigan II:Being the largest site in the lower reservoir zone on the right bank, it was stripped with a backhoe. Although this revealed no deposits before the Late Archaic.

The last two years: 1975-1976

Focus was shifted during these last two years. This time would be spent on intensive excavation of the four sites with the most significant elements. This was done to maintain most focus on the initial hypotheses which asked the question; What was the relationship between environment and culture during the late Archaic and Mississippian periods, or the past 4000 yrs?

- Nowlin II: Excavation on this site in the lower reservoir was done by the Wright State University field school and continued through June and July 1974.
- Ewell III: Patterns indicating Wade, McFarland, and Mason phase inhabitance patterns were discovered in the alluvial terrace of the Ewell site.
- Jernigan II: This site, the largest on the right bank of the lower reservoir, revealed no in situ deposits earlier than Late Archaic.on the right bank of the Duck River, was the most intensely occupied site in the lower reservoir. Within test Stratum 1 a Late Woodland Mason phase shaft-and-chamber grave was found containing the remains of a sixteen- to nineteen-year-old female year old. Radiocarbon dated to AD 770 plus or minus 85 years, this is the earliest occurrence of this grave type in the southeastern United States. The well preserved remains of an infant were also found on this site.
- Eoff I: In 1975 excavation intensified in this area.

== Interpretations ==
=== Cultural phases ===
The following categorizations are the result of radiocarbon dates in association with the cultural components to draw an image of the passing cultural phases. This data was derived from a sample pool consisting of eighty two radiocarbon dates and seven archaeomagnetic dates. By combining these factors, cultural phases can be placed into the proper archaeological time periods. The following is an interpretation of the cultural phases within their associated time periods. By classifying artifacts, a picture of what cultures occupied the Basin during what times can be understood. In addition, a view of when the basin remained uninhabited can also be drawn. Identifying cultural time periods and phases, along with determining patterns of occupation, can also be very beneficial when determining the amount of contact between cultural phases and groups residing simultaneously.

Normandy Basin cultural phases present
Paleoindian	Archaic		Woodland					Mississippian
	Middle Archaic	Late Archaic	Early Woodland	Early Middle Woodland	Middle Woodland	Late Middle Woodland	Late Woodland	Mississippian	Late Mississippian
		Ledbetter Phase	Long Branch Phase	McFarland Phase	McFarland Phase	Owl Hollow Phase	Mason Phase	Emergent Mississippian Phase
		Hicks Phase	Watts Bar Phase		Owl Hollow Phase	Mason Phase		Early Mississippian Phase
		Wade Phase	Neel Phase		Mason Phase

=== Conclusions ===
Subsistence developments

The hypothesis concerning the usage of plants and animals in the culture and how that relates to settlement pattern, was focused on and tested against the materials found. The question of whether or not the patterns of hunting and gathering shifted into a more agricultural focus in coordination with the passage of time from Archaic to Mississippian. White tailed deer was the primary source of meat but other vertebrates were a constant alternative. When questioning which plants were a source of food, a variety of herbaceous annuals were utilized from the late archaic and increased onto the Middle Woodland. Maize was found in context with the Owl Hollow, while other food sources such as squash and gourd rind were also recovered. Domestication of herbaceous plants such as the chenopodium, marsh elder, and even the domestication of some of these plants was evident by the Middle Woodland period. This shift to intensive gardening seems to coincide with a shift from sparse settlements to condensed communities within the fertile floodplain of the lower reservoir zone in the Owl Hollow and Banks phases.

Settlement and community patterns

The past four-thousand years was the time span in question and was concentrated on most intensively to determine whether or not the individuals were living a mobile hunter gatherer lifestyle of whether they were living in a permanent villages. In the early Middle woodland period, homes were found scattered throughout both reservoir zones, but these scattered temporary settlement patterns had shifted to more permanent homes found only in the lower reservoir by the late McFarland phase. This may have been a result of the efforts toward the construction of the Old Stone Fort enclosure. Permanent homes were found only in the lower reservoir zones during the Mississippian cultures and during the Owl Hollow phases. These observed shifts in settlement are explained with a correlation to their subsistence patterns, patterns of gardening herbaceous annuals, and some maize farming done by the Owl Hollow people. An alternative way of determining whether a home is temporary or permanent is to observe the frequency of food preparation and storage facilities. In the Archaic phase the only site with evidence of this time period is the Eoff III. The completeness of the components found here indicates the reduced frequency of use of this area as a temporary seasonal dwelling as the community shifted towards a less mobile lifestyle. In the Ledbetter phase, more storage pits, burials, and postholes are observed. Continuing in to the wade phase a greater degree of permanency is indicated by homes with walls and roofs. More exotic materials such as dover chert and steatite are seen in this phase which indicated a greater degree of complexity in trade and communication.

Major occupations were found in the area spanning from the Late Archaic period, through the Mississippian periods. "From archaeological observation, there is no verification of late or protohistoric Mississippian occupation of the Reservoir area".[5] Initial Native American populations were mobile hunter-gatherers living in small groups. Many of the earlier sites, dating to the late Pleistocene/early Holocene, were covered by later occupations. During the Middle Archaic period (c. 4000-6000 BC), larger sites appeared, with locations again guided by environmental factors, as was the case throughout prehistory.[5] Ceramics appeared after 1000 BC. during the Woodland period. Cultural continuation is evident between the Early Woodland Long Branch and Middle Woodland McFarland Phases. The latter phase of which seems to relate with the Copena culture of Northern Alabama. Connections to Scioto and Havana Hopewell in Ohio and Illinois and southern Hopewellian sites, like Tunacunnhee, are indicated by foreign grave goods, extravagant burial practices, and earthworks. With c. AD 200 comes the appearance of the Owl Hollow culture. There is little to no connection between the Owl culture and the Mason phase. Although some Mason culture traits, such as net impressed pottery and shaft-and-chamber graves are found in Late Woodland Cultures. Sites from the Woodland period remain small, little can be determined from this period. Only Jernigan II shows evidence of extended seasonal occupation even though occupation decreased on the Duck River during this time. Within the Upper Duck Valley, the Middle Woodland periods exhibits proof of having the densest population which consisted of 25-30 individuals, or three extended households. The upper duck river valleys continued to undergo testing to ascertain the subsistence and settlement patterns of the Middle Woodland phase.

== Surrounding sites ==
Not far from Lake Normandy lies the Old Stone Fort Archaeological state park, a 2000 yr old Indian ceremonial site. Built by the people of the Middle Woodland culture, the walls and mounds that were once believed to be a fort are now thought to be a 50-acre enclosure making a ceremonial site and gathering place. The park is on the National Register of Historic Places.

== Scientific publications ==
- BACON, WILLARD S.
  - 1982 Structural Data Recovered from the Banks I11 Site (40CF108) and the Parks Site (40CFSB), Normandy Reservoir, Coffee County, Tennessee. Tennessee Anthropologist 712):176-197.
- BROWN, TRACY C.
  - 1982 Prehistoric Mortuary Patterning and Change in the Normandy Reservoir, Coffee County, Tennessee. M.A. thesis, Department of Anthropology, University of Tennessee, Knoxville.
- CHAPMAN, LLOYD N.
  - 1978 The Mississippian Component at the Eoff 1 Site. M.A. thesis, Department of Anthropology, University of Tennessee, Knoxville.
  - 1982 The Mississippian Component at the Eoff I Site. In Eighth Report of the Normandy Archaeological Project, edited by Charles H. Faulkner and Major C. R. McCollough, pp. 1–148. University of Tennessee, Department of Anthropology, Report of Investigations No. 33 and TVA Publications in Anthropology No. 30. Knoxville.
- COBB, JAMES E.
  - 1978 The Middle Woodland Occupations of the Banks V Site, 40CFlll. In Fifth Report of the Normandy Archaeological Project, edited by Charles H. Faulkner and Major C. R. McCollough, pp. 72–327. University of Tennessee, Department of Anthropology, Report of Investigations No. 20. Knoxville.
  - 1982 The Late Middle Woodland Occupation of the Eoff 1 Site, 40CF32. In Eighth Report of the Normandy Archaeological Project, edited By Charles H. Faulkner and Major C. R. McCollough, pp. 149–301. University of Tennessee, Department of Anthropology. Report of Investigations No. 33 and N A Publications in Anthropology No.30. Knoxville.
  - 1985 Late Middle Woodland Settlement and Subsistence Patterns on the Eastern Highland Rim of Middle Tennessee. Ph.D. dissertation, Department of Anthropology, University of Tennessee, Knoxville.
- COBB, JAMES E., and CHARLES H. FAULKNER.
  - 1978 The Owl Hollow Project: Middle Woodland and Subsistence Patterns in the Eastern Highland Rim of Tennessee. Final report submitted to the National Science Foundation in accordance with the requirements of Grant BNS 76-11266. *
- CRITES, GARY D.
  - 1978 Paleotnobotany of the Normandy Reservoir in the Upper Duck River Valley, Tennessee. M.A. thesis, Department of Anthropology, University of Tennessee, Knoxville.
- DAVIS, R. P. STEPHEN, JR.
  - 1976 The Wiser-Stephens Site-4OCF81. MA. thesis, Department of Archaeology, University of Calgary, Alberta, Canada.
  - 1978 Excavations at the Wiser-Stephens 1 Site. In Sixth Report of the Normandy Archaeological Project, edited by Major C. R. McCollough and Charles H. Faulkner, pp. 291–547. University of Tennessee, Department of Anthropology, Report of Investigations No. 21, Wright State University/Laboratory of Anthropology/Notes in Anthropology No. 4, N A Publications in Anthropology No. 19. Chattanooga.
- DUGGAN, BETTY J.
  - 1982 A Synthesis of the Late Woodland Mason Phase in the Normandy and Tims Ford Reservoirs in Middle Tennessee. M.A. thesis, Department of Anthropology, University of Tennessee, Knoxville.
- DUVALL, GLYN D.
  - 1977 The Ewell Ill Site (40CF118): An Early Middle Woodland McFatland Phase Site in the Normandy Reservoir, Coffee County, Tennessee. M.A. thesis, Department of Anthropology, University of Tennessee, Knoxville.
  - 1982 The Ewell III Site (40CF1181. In Seventh Report of the Normandy Archaeological Project, edited by Charles H. Faulkner and Major C. R. McCollough, pp. 8–151. University of Tennessee, Department of Anthropology, Report of Investigations No. 32, TVA Publications in Anthropology No. 29.
- FAULKNER, CHARLES H.
  - 1971 An Archaeological Survey of the Proposed Normandy Reservoir: Interim Report. On file in the Department of Anthropology, University of Tennessee, Knoxville.
  - 1977a The Hicks Site (40CF62). In Fourth Report of the Normandy Archaeological Project, edited by Charles H. Faulkner and Major C. R. McCollough, pp. 9–63. University of Tennessee, Department of Anthropology, Report of Investigations No. 19. Knoxville.
  - 1977b Eoff 1 Site (40CF32). In Fourth Report of the Normandy Archaeological Project, edited by Charles H. Faulkner and Major C. R. McCollough, pp. 64–278. University of Tennessee, Department of Anthropology, Report of Investigations N0.19. Knoxville.
  - 1977c Eoff 111 Site (40CF107). In Fourth Report of the Normandy Archeological Project, edited by Charles H. Faulkner and Major C. R. McCollough, pp. 279–299. University of Tennessee, Department of Anthropology, Report of Investigations No. 19. Knoxville.
  - 1982 The Duke I Site (40CF97). In Eighth Report of the Normandy Archaeological Project, edited by Charles H. Faulkner and Major C. R. McCollough, pp. 527–541. University of Tennessee, Department of Anthropology, Report of Investigations No. 33, WA Publications in Anthropology No. 30. Knoxville.
  - 1988 Middle Woodland Community and Settlement Patterns on the Eastern Highland Rim of Tennessee. In Middle Woodland Settlement and Ceremonialism in the Mid-South and Lower Mississippi Valley, edited by Robert C. Mainfort, Jr., pp. 76–98. Archaeological Report 22, Mississippi Department of Archives and History, Jackson.
  - 2002 Woodland Cultures of the Elk and Duck River Valleys, Tennessee: Continuity and Change. In The Woodland Southeast, edited by David G. Anderson and Robert C. Mainfort, Jr., pp. 185–203. University of Alabama Press, Tuscaloosa.
- FAULKNER, CHARLES H., and MAJOR C. R. MCCOLLOUGH.
  - 1973 Introductory Report of the Normandy Reservoir Salvage Project: Environmental Setting, Typology, and Survey. Normandy Archaeological Project, vol. 1. University of Tennessee, Department of Anthropology, Report of Investigations No. 11. Knoxville.
  - 1974 Excavations and Testing, Normandy Reservoir Salvage Project:1972 Seasons. Normandy Archaeological Project, vol. 2, University of Tennessee, Department of Anthropology, Report of Investigations No. 12. Knoxville.
  - 1982a Excavation of the Jernigan II Site (40CF37). In Seventh Report of the Normandy Archaeological Project, edited by Charles H. Faulkner and Maim C. R. McCollough, pp. 153–311. University of Tennessee, Department of Anthropology, Report of Investigations No. 32 and TVA Publications in Anthropology No. 2Y. Knoxville.
  - 1982b The Investigation of the Parks Site (40CF5). In Seventh Report of the Normandy Archaeological Project, edited by Charles H. Faulkner and Major C. R. McCollough, pp. 313–352. University of Tennessee, Department of Anthropology, Report of Investigations No. 32, and TVA Publications in Anthropology No. 29. Knoxville.
- FAULKNER, CHARLES H., and MAJOR C. R. MCCOLLOUGH, EDS.
  - 1978 Fifth Report of the Normandy Archaeological Project, edited by Charles H. Faulkner and Major C. R. McCollough. University of Tennessee, Department oi Anthropology, Report of Investigations No. 20. Knoxville.
- KEEL, BENNIE C.
  - 1978 Excavations at the Nowlin II Site. In Sixth Report of the Normandy Archaeological Project, edited by Major C. R. McCollough and Charles H. Faulkner, pp. XI-290. University of Tennessee, Department of Anthropology, Report of Investigations No. 21, Wright State University, Laboratory of Anthropology, Notes in Anthropology No. 4, TVA Publications in Anthropology No. 19. Chattanooga.
- KLINE, GERALD W., GARY D. CRITES, and CHARLES H. FAULKNER.
  - 1982 The McFarland Project: Early Middle Woodland Settlement and Subsistence in the Upper Duck Valley in Tennessee. Tennessee Anthropological Association, Miscellaneous Paper No. 8. Knoxville.
- MCCOLLOUGH, MAJOR C. R., and GLYN D. DUVALL
  - 1976 Results of 1973 Testing. In Third Report of the Normandy Reservoir Salvage Project, edited by Major C. R. McCollough and Charles H. Faulkner, pp. 27–139. University of Tennessee, Department of Anthropology, Report of Investigations No. 16. Knoxville.
- MCCOLLOUGH, MAJOR C. R.. GLYN D. DUVALL, CHARLES H. FAULKNER, and TRACY C. BROWN
  - 1979 A Late Woodland Shaft and Chamber Grave in the Normandy Reservoir, Tennessee. Tennessee Anthropologist 4(1):175-188.
- MCMAHAN, JOE DAVID
  - 1983 Paleoethnobotany of the Late Woodland Mason Phase in the Elk and Duck River Valleys, Tennessee. M.A. thesis, Department of Anthropology, University of Tennessee, Knoxville.
- PENNY. JAMES S., JR., and Major C. R. MCCOLLOUGH
  - 1976 The Normandy Lithic Resource Survey. In Third Report of the Normandy Reservoir Salvage Project, edited by Major C. R. McCollough and Charles Faulkner, pp. 140–194. University of Tennessee, Department of Anthropology, Report of Investigations No. 16. Knoxville.
- PRESCOTT, WILLIAM D.
  - 1978 Analysis of Surface Survey Data from the Normandy Reservoir. M.A. thesis, Department of Anthropology University of Tennessee, Knoxville.
- ROBISON, NEIL D.
  - 1977 Zooarchaeological Analysis of the Mississippian Faunal Remains from the Normandy Reservoir. M.A. thesis, Department of Anthropology, University of Tennessee, Knoxville.
  - 1978 A Zooarchaeological Analysis of the Mississippian Faunal Remains from the Normandy Reservoir. In Fifth Report of the Normandy Archaeological Project, edited by Charles H. Faulkner and Major C. R. McCollough, pp. 498–595. University of Tennessee, Department of Anthropology, Report of investigations No. 10. Knoxville.
  - 1986 An Analysis and Interpretation of the Faunal Remains from Eight Late Middle Woodland Owl Hollow Phase Sites in Coffee, Franklin and Bedford Counties. Ph.D. dissertation, Department of Anthropology, University oi Tennessee, Knoxville.
- SHEA, ANDREA B.
  - 1977 Comparison of Middle Woodland and Early Mississippian Subsistence Patterns: Analysis of Plant Remains from an Archaeological Site in the Duck River Valley, Tennessee, Supplemented by the Potentially Exploitable Native Flora. MS. thesis, Department of Botany, University of Tennessee, Knoxville.
  - 1978 An Analysis of Plant Remains from the Middle Woodland and Mississippian Components on the Banks V Site and a Paleoethnobotanical Study of the Native Flora of the Upper Duck Valley. In Fifth Report of the Normandy Archaeological Project, edited by Charles H. Faulkner and Major C. R. McCollough, pp. 596–699. University of Tennessee, Department of Anthropology, Report of Investigations No. 20. Knoxville.
- WAGNER, MARK J.
  - 1980 The Aaron Shelton Site (40CF69): A Multicomponent Site in the Lower Normandy Reservoir. M.A. thesis, Department of Anthropology, University of Tennessee, Knoxville.
  - 1982 The Aaron Shelton Site (40CF69): A Multicomponent Site in the Lower Normandy Reservoir. In Eighth Report of the Normandy Archaeological Project, edited by Charles H. Faulkner and C. R. McCollough, pp. 389–526. University of Tennessee, Department of Anthropology, Report of Investigations No. 33, TVA Publications in Anthropology No.30. Knoxville.

== See also ==
- Tennessee Valley Authority
- National Park Service
- University of Tennessee, Knoxville
- Duck River (Tennessee)
- Middle Tennessee
- Bedford County
- List of dams and reservoirs of the Tennessee River
- List of dams and reservoirs in the United States
- Wright State University
