= Tennessee State Route 280 =

State highway in Tennessee, United States

State Route 280
- SR 280 highlighted in red

Route information
- Maintained by TDOT
- Length: 10.6 mi (17.1 km)
- Existed: July 1, 1983–present

Major junctions
- West end: US 41 in Beechgrove
- East end: SR 53 in Pocahontas

Location
- Country: United States
- State: Tennessee
- Counties: Coffee

Highway system
- Tennessee State Routes; Interstate; US; State
← SR 279	→ SR 281

State Route 280 (SR 280) is a 10.6-mile-long (17.1 km) east-west state highway in northern Coffee County, Tennessee. It serves as a connection between the communities of Beechgrove and Pocahontas. It also serves the community of Lakewood Park.

== Route description ==
SR 280 begins in Beechgrove at an intersection with US 41/SR 2 at the southern edge of the community. It winds its way east through the hills of the Highland Rim for several miles before turning southeast through farmland. The highway then turns east again entering the community of Lakewood Park along Gnat Hill Road, with some maps listing this as Noah-Pocahontas Road, to pass through rural areas to enter Pocahontas, where SR 280 comes to an end at an intersection with SR 53. The entire route of SR 280 is a rural two-lane highway.

== Major intersections ==
The entire route is in Coffee County.

Location	mi	km	Destinations	Notes
Beechgrove	0.0	0.0	US 41 (Murfreesboro Highway / SR 2) – Murfreesboro, Manchester	Western terminus
Pocahontas	10.6	17.1	SR 53 (Woodbury Highway) / Pocahontas Road east – Manchester, Woodbury	Eastern terminus; road continues east as Pocahontas Road.
1.000 mi = 1.609 km; 1.000 km = 0.621 mi
