= Wilkinson-Keele House =

- Wilkinson--Keele House
- U.S. National Register of Historic Places
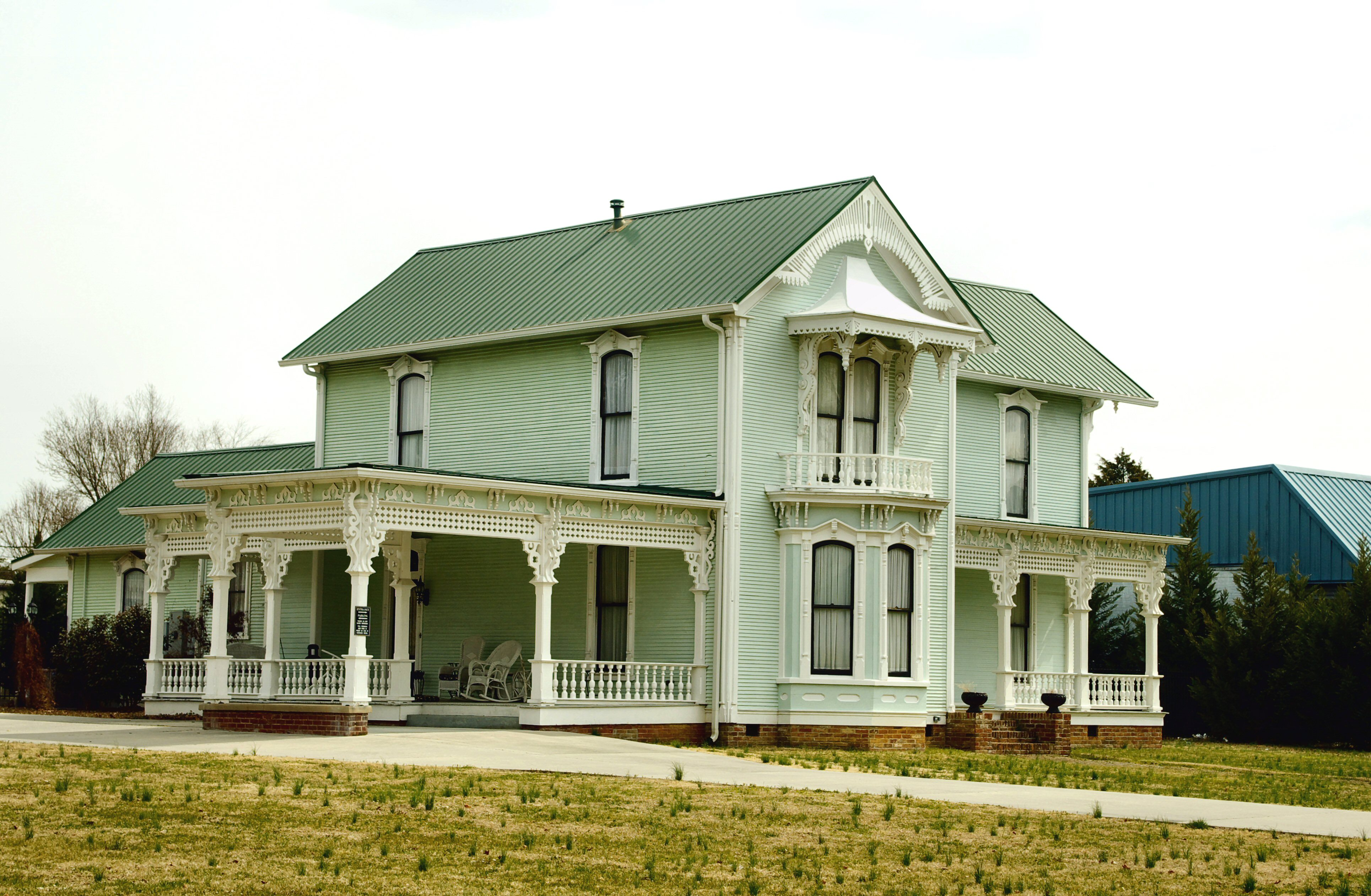
- The house in 2014

- Location within Tennessee
- Location: 313 South Ramsey Street, Manchester, Tennessee
- Coordinates: 35°28′55″N 86°05′03″W
- Area: 1.4 acres (0.57 ha)
- Built: 1888
- Architectural style: Queen Anne
- NRHP reference No.: 06001040
- Added to NRHP: November 15, 2006

The Wilkinson-Keele House is a historic house in Manchester, Tennessee. It was built in 1888 by J. G. Wilkinson, the president of the Bank of Manchester, and designed in the Queen Anne architectural style. It was purchased by Judge Robert Keele in 1937. It has been listed on the National Register of Historic Places since November 15, 2006.
