= Funke Egbemode =

Nigerian journalist

- Citizenship: Nigeria
- Education: Baptist Girls High School, Osogbo
- Occupation: Journalist,
- Employer: Osun State Government

Funke Egbemode is a Nigerian female journalist, Managing Director of the New Telegraph newspaper.

== Early life and career ==
Funke Aderanti is a Nigerian journalist and columnist with a career spanning over three decades. She has worked with several prominent Nigerian newspapers, including Punch, Post Express, ThisDay, Saturday Independent, and Daily Sun. She is currently a columnist with The Sun Newspaper.

Funke was born to Joseph Aderanti and Florence Aderanti. She attended Baptist Practising Primary School in Iwo, Osun State, and completed her secondary education at Baptist Girls High School, Osogbo, also in Osun State.

She currently serves as the head of the secretariat of the International Press Institute (IPI) in Nigeria. She is a board member of the Federal Radio Corporation of Nigeria (FRCN), a position she has held since 2006.

Funke served as the President of Nigerian Guild of Editors for two terms. She is currently the Commissioner for Information and Orientation in Osun State, Nigeria.

== Spouse ==
Nicholas Adedotun Egbemode
