= Normandy Dam =

Dam on the Duck River, Tennessee

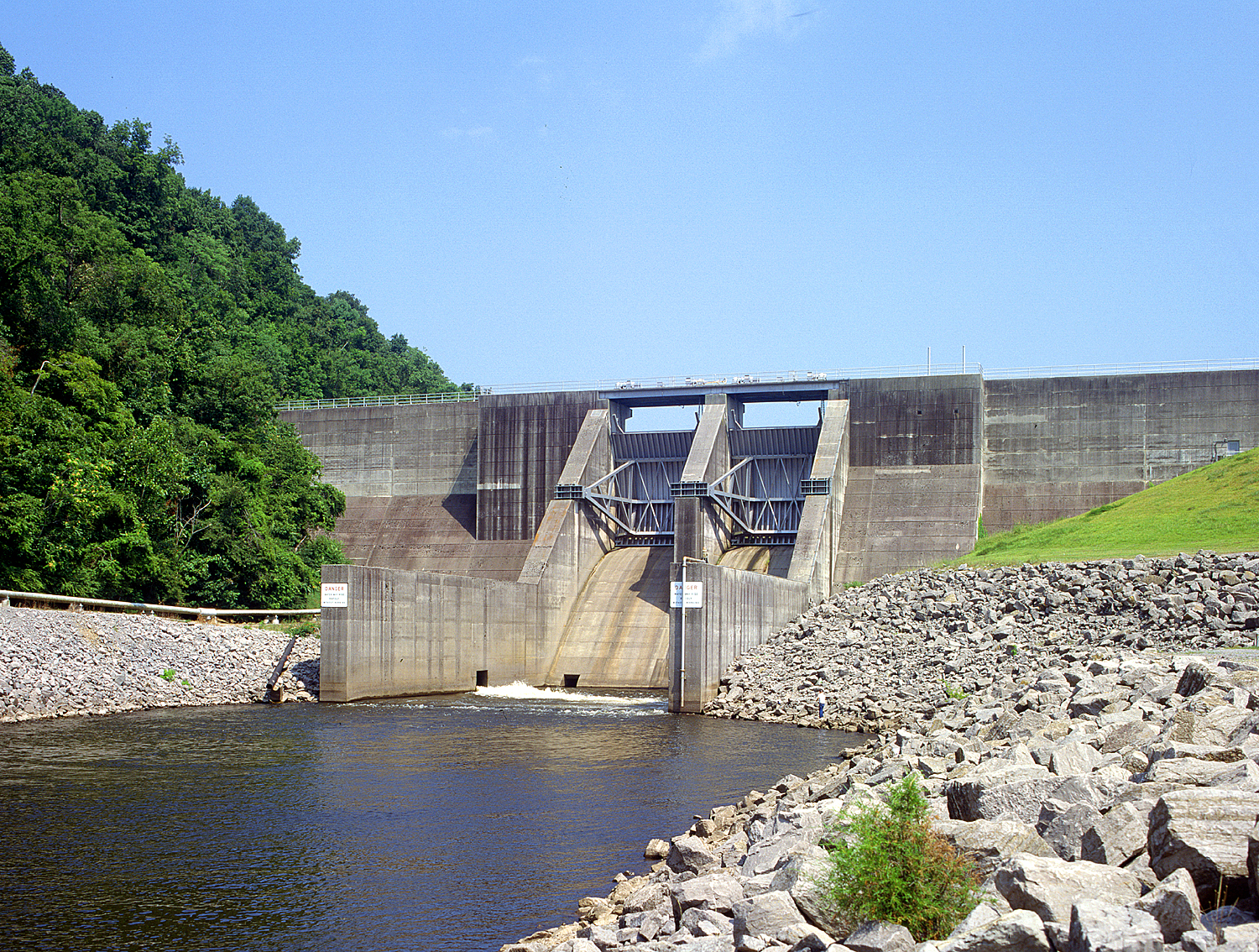
- Normandy Dam
- Interactive map of Normandy Dam
- Coordinates: 35.465476°N 86.24259°W

Dam and spillways
- Impounds: Duck River
- Height: 110 ft (34 m)
- Length: 2,807 ft (856 m)

Reservoir
- Total capacity: 126,100 acre⋅ft (155,500 dam^{3})
- Catchment area: 195 mi^{2} (510 km^{2})
- Surface area: 2,490 acres (1,010 ha)

Normandy Dam is a dam built by the Tennessee Valley Authority (TVA) on the Duck River in the U.S. state of Tennessee. It straddles the border between Bedford and Coffee counties. Completed in 1976, the dam was built primarily for flood control and economic development purposes, and does not produce any electricity. The town of Normandy is located just southwest of the dam. The water level in Normandy Reservoir varies about 11 feet in a normal year.

The dam is 110 feet (34 m) high and spans 2,807 feet (856 m) across the river valley.

== See also ==
Normandy Archaeological Project
