= L.D. Hickerson House =

- L. D. Hickerson House
- U.S. National Register of Historic Places
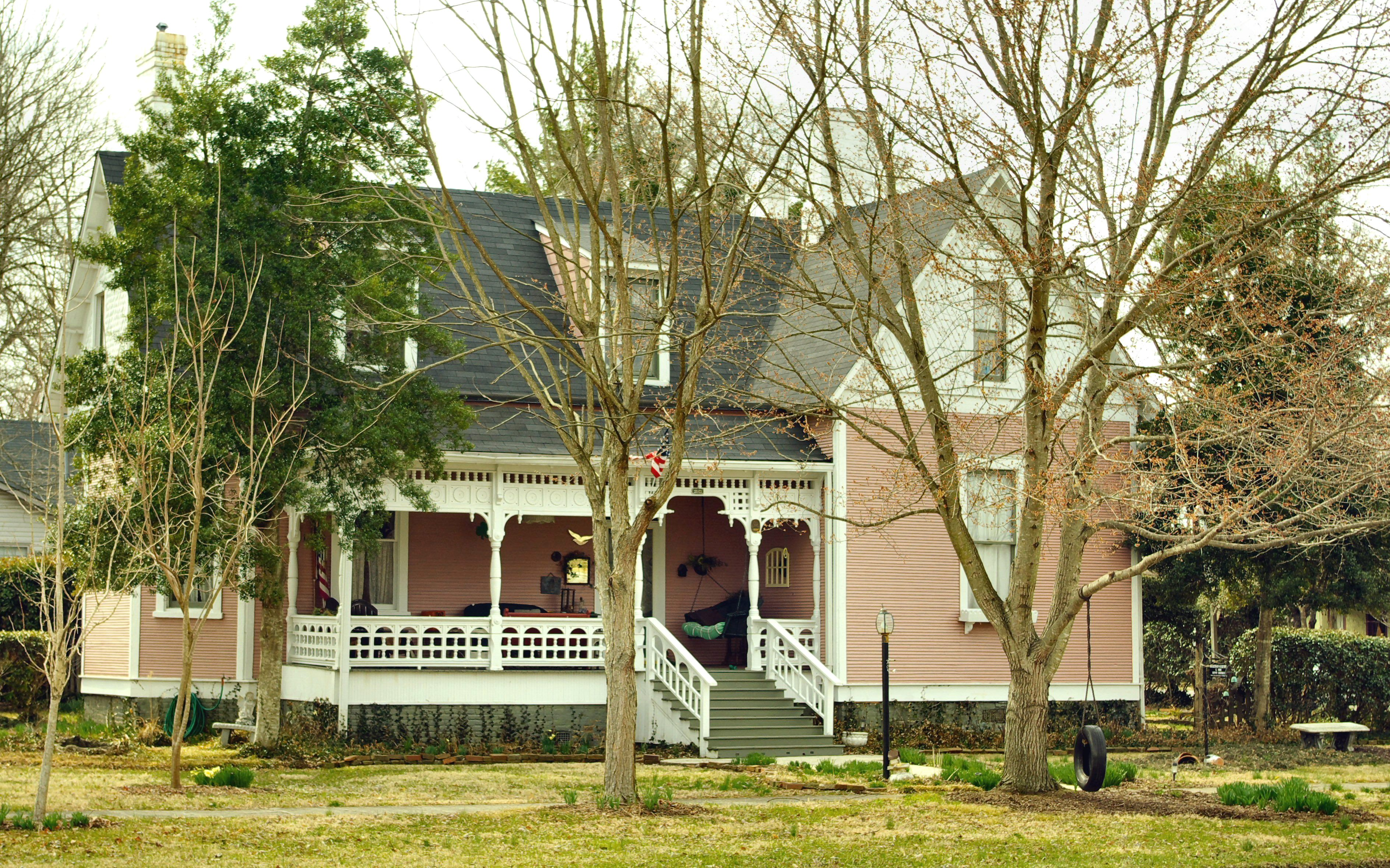
- The house in 2014

- Location within Tennessee
- Location: 215 North Washington Street, Tullahoma, Tennessee
- Coordinates: 35°21′56″N 86°12′36″W
- Area: less than one acre
- Built: 1895
- Architectural style: Stick/eastlake, Folk Victorian
- MPS: Tullahoma MPS
- NRHP reference No.: 89001395
- Added to NRHP: August 18, 1993

The L.D. Hickerson House is a historic house in Tullahoma, Tennessee. It was built in 1895 for Lytle David Hickerson, the founding president of the McMinnville & Manchester Railroad and the First National Bank. It was designed in the Stick-Eastlake style. It has been listed on the National Register of Historic Places since August 18, 1993.
