= Lakewood Park, Tennessee =

Lakewood Park
- Census-designated place
- Location within Tennessee Location within the United States
- Coordinates: 35°38′53″N 86°08′09″W
- Country: United States
- State: Tennessee
- County: Coffee

Government
  - Type: Home owners association

Area
  - Total: 5.85 sq mi (15.16 km^{2})
  - Land: 5.74 sq mi (14.87 km^{2})
  - Water: 0.11 sq mi (0.29 km^{2})
- Elevation: 1,204 ft (367 m)

Population (2020)
  - Total: 1,161
  - Density: 202.2/sq mi (78.08/km^{2})
- Time zone: UTC-6 (Central (CST))
  - Summer (DST): UTC-5 (CDT)
- ZIP code: 37018
- Area code: 931
- GNIS feature ID: 2584583

Lakewood Park is a census-designated place in Coffee County, Tennessee, United States. The population was 1,161 at the 2020 census, up from 990 at the 2010 census. It is located near Tennessee State Route 280, north of Manchester.

== Demographics ==
Historical population
Census	Pop.	Note	%±
2020	1,161		—
U.S. Decennial Census
