= Stanley Rogers =

American politician (born 1939)

J. Stanley Rogers (born March 2, 1939) is an American politician. A Manchester, Tennessee native, has been a member of the Tennessee Board of Regents since July 29, 1994. In 2003 he was elected to the position of vice-chair of the board.

He is a graduate of Middle Tennessee State University before going to law school at Vanderbilt University. He passed the Tennessee bar in 1964. He is also admitted to practice law before the United States District Courts for the Eastern, Middle and Western Districts of Tennessee; United States Court of Appeals for the Sixth Circuit, United States Claims Court, and the U. S. Supreme Court.

Professionally, Rogers is a senior partner with the Rogers & Duncan Law Firm.

Additionally, Rogers is a member of the Coffee County, Tennessee, Federal and American Bar Associations; Tennessee Trial Lawyers Association; and The Association of Trial Lawyers of America. Additionally, he is a fellow of the American College of Trial Lawyers.

Other groups he has been associated with include the Lawyers Involved for Tennessee, Tennessee Appellate Court Nominating Commission (1978–1992, was Chairman in 1990), Tennessee Judicial Evaluation Commission (1995–2001) and the U. S. Circuit Judge Nominating Commission, Sixth Circuit (1976–1980).

For six years, Rogers served in the Tennessee House of Representatives. He was majority leader during the 88th and 89th General Assemblies.

Rogers may also be noted as the contender who opposed future Vice President Al Gore during the Democratic Party primary, in Gore's first election in 1976 for the United States House of Representatives.

He has a wife, Pat, and three children.
