= Fudgearound, Tennessee =

- Unincorporated community
- Location within Tennessee Location within the United States
- Coordinates: 35°40′57″N 86°10′47″W
- Country: United States
- State: Tennessee
- County: Coffee
- Elevation: 1,293 ft (394 m)
- Time zone: UTC-6 (Central (CST))
  - Summer (DST): UTC-5 (CDT)
- Area code: 931
- GNIS feature ID: 1643854

Fudgearound is unincorporated community in Coffee County, Tennessee, United States.
