= Farrar Distillery =

- U.S. National Register of Historic Places
- Location within Tennessee Location within the United States
- Nearest city: Noah, Tennessee
- Coordinates: 35°34′50″N 86°10′18″W
- Area: 3.5 acres (1.4 ha)
- Built: 1876
- NRHP reference No.: 84003472
- Added to NRHP: September 27, 1984

The Farrar Distillery is a former 19th-century distillery in Noah, Tennessee, about 11 miles (18 km) north of Manchester. It is located on a family farm that dates to 1869, when Alexander Farrar purchased a tract of 103 acres (42 ha). He expanded the farm in 1875 with the acquisition of an additional 30 acres (12 ha). In addition to producing wheat, corn, small grains, and livestock on the farm, Farrar established the distillery and produced and sold corn whiskey along with and apple and peach brandies. The distillery operated until 1902, when it was closed after being damaged by flooding.

The Farrar Distillery was listed on the National Register of Historic Places in 1984. The farm property, now known as the Thomas Farm, is owned by Wanda Lou Hannah and Jack Nolan Thomas, descendants of the Farrar family. It is recognized as a Tennessee century farm. A barn built on the property by Alexander Farrar during the 19th century is also intact and is used for storage.

== See also ==
- Tennessee whiskey
