= The Saturday Independent =

Weekly newspaper in Tennessee, US

The Saturday Independent was a weekly newspaper founded in 2004 by Beth and Chip Ramsey that formerly circulated throughout Coffee County, Tennessee, USA. The paper went out of business in 2013.
