= Belmont, Coffee County, Tennessee =

Unincorporated community in Tennessee, US

Coordinates: 35°25′17″N 86°06′46″W

Belmont is an unincorporated community in Coffee County, in the U.S. state of Tennessee.

The original owner of the town site, a native of Belmont County, Ohio, selected the name.
