= Shady Grove, Coffee County, Tennessee =

Shady Grove, Tennessee
- Unincorporated community
- Location within Tennessee Location within the United States
- Coordinates: 35°37′09″N 85°59′07″W
- Country: United States
- State: Tennessee
- County: Coffee
- Elevation: 1,079 ft (329 m)
- Time zone: UTC-6 (Central (CST))
  - Summer (DST): UTC-5 (CDT)
- Area code: 931
- GNIS feature ID: 1315902

Shady Grove is an unincorporated community in Coffee County, Tennessee, United States. Shady Grove is 3.9 miles (6.3 km) west-northwest of Morrison.
