= Farrar Hill, Tennessee =

- Unincorporated community
- Location within Tennessee Location within the United States
- Coordinates: 35°34′41″N 86°09′44″W
- Country: United States
- State: Tennessee
- County: Coffee
- Elevation: 1,145 ft (349 m)
- Time zone: UTC-6 (Central (CST))
  - Summer (DST): UTC-5 (CDT)
- Area code: 931
- GNIS feature ID: 1315050

Farrar Hill is an unincorporated community in Coffee County, Tennessee, United States.
