= New Union, Tennessee =

- Census-designated place
- Location within Tennessee
- Coordinates: 35°31′57″N 86°04′51″W
- Country: United States
- State: Tennessee
- County: Coffee

Area
  - Total: 3.84 sq mi (9.95 km^{2})
  - Land: 3.84 sq mi (9.95 km^{2})
  - Water: 0 sq mi (0.00 km^{2})
- Elevation: 1,096 ft (334 m)

Population (2020)
  - Total: 1,646
  - Density: 428.6/sq mi (165.49/km^{2})
- Time zone: UTC-6 (Central (CST))
  - Summer (DST): UTC-5 (CDT)
- ZIP code: 37355
- Area code: 931
- GNIS feature ID: 1295658

New Union is an unincorporated community and Census-designated place in Coffee County, Tennessee. The population was 1,646 at the 2020 census, up from 1,431 at the 2010 census.

== Demographics ==
Historical population
Census	Pop.	Note	%±
2020	1,646		—
U.S. Decennial Census
