= Noah, Tennessee =

Unincorporated community in Tennessee, US

Coordinates: 35°34′23″N 86°11′28″W

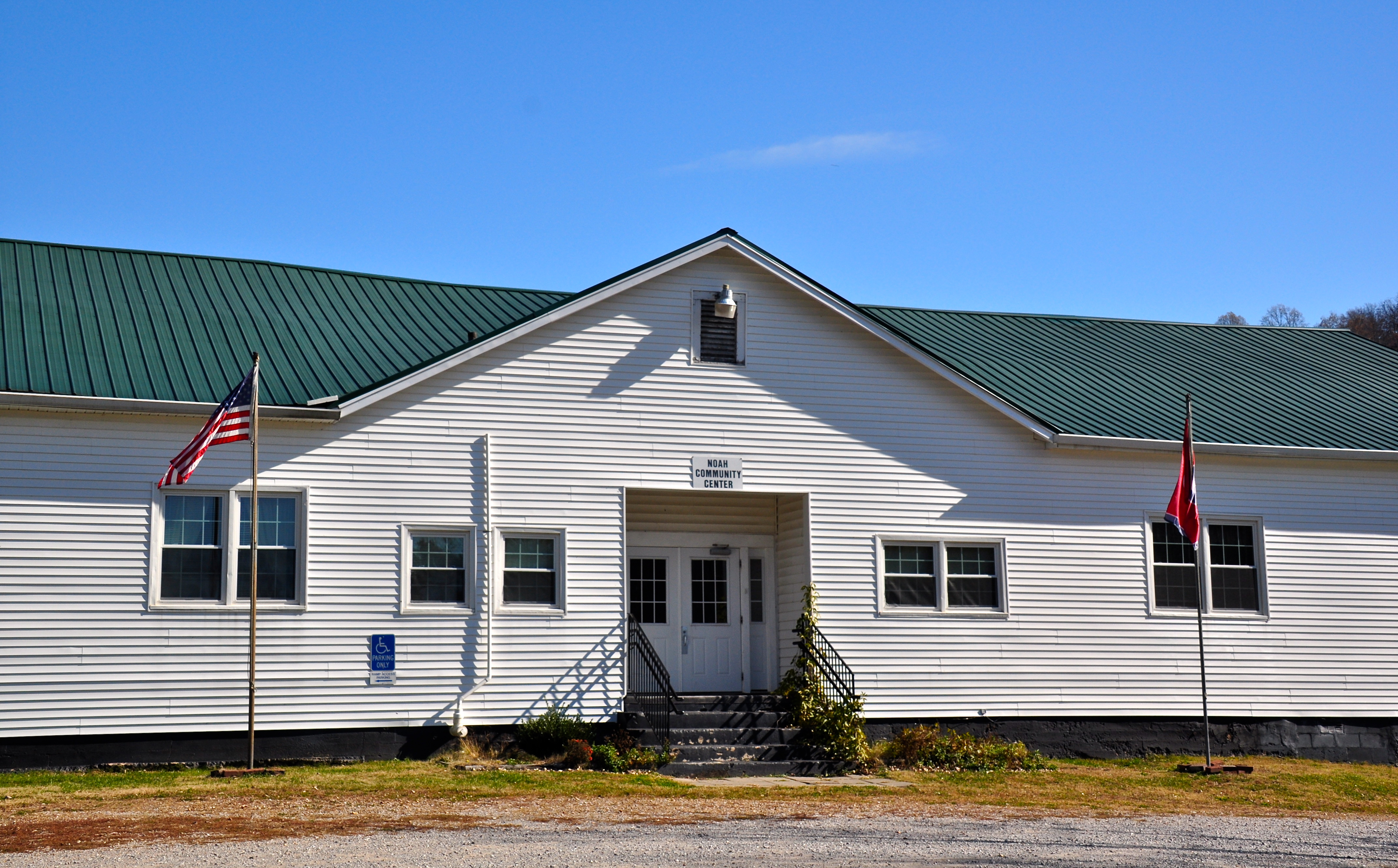
The Noah Community Center, November 2014

Noah is an unincorporated community in Coffee County, Tennessee. In 1887 it was described as being 8.5 miles (13.7 km) north of the county seat of Manchester and having a population between 50 and 100. Noah is believed to be the first settlement in Coffee County, having been settled on the Noah Fork of the Duck River about 1800 by the Patton Brothers, John, Daniel, and Neely.

Between 1830 and 1840 Jonathan Webster built a corn-mill on Noah Fork. In the 1880s minor industries in Noah included Samuel Brantley's saw and grist mill and the Beckman Bros.' flour and grist-mill. From the 1870s to 1902 the Farrar Distillery operated on the Thomas Farm, selling apple brandy and peach brandy, along with corn whiskey. The Farrar Distillery ceased operation in 1902 after being damaged by flooding.

The first post office opened in Noah on May 2, 1836, and closed on June 26, 1845. A second post office was established on June 23, 1880, but closed on May 15, 1905.

One of the oldest churches in Noah is the Noah’s Fork Baptist Church, erected between 1830 and 1840. The church was destroyed by fire in 1924, but was rebuilt shortly thereafter. Other churches in Noah during the 19th century include Noah Fork Separate Baptist and Noah Methodist Episcopal South.
