= Old Stone Fort (Tennessee) =

Archaeological site in Tennessee, US

- U.S. National Register of Historic Places
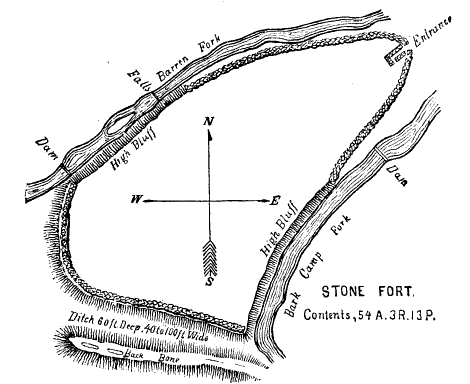
- Map of the fort from Joseph Jones's Explorations of the Aboriginal Remains of Tennessee (1876)

- Location within Tennessee Location within the United States
- Location: 732 Stone Fort Drive
- Nearest city: Manchester, Tennessee
- Coordinates: 35°28′58″N 86°6′28″W
- Built: 0-499 A.D.
- Website: Old Stone Fort
- NRHP reference No.: 73001757
- Added to NRHP: 1973

The Old Stone Fort is a prehistoric Native American structure located in Coffee County, Tennessee, in the Southeastern United States. Most likely built between 80 and 550 AD during the Middle Woodland period, the structure is considered the most complex hilltop enclosure found in the South and was likely used for ceremonial purposes rather than defense.

The structure is now part of Old Stone Fort State Archaeological Park, one of two state archaeological parks in Tennessee (the other being at Pinson Mounds near Jackson). The site is listed on the National Register of Historic Places.

== Geographic setting ==
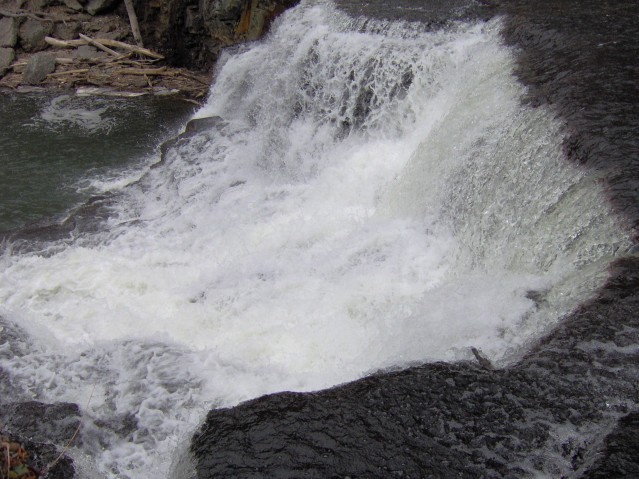
Big Falls on the Duck River, below the Old Stone Fort's northwestern section

The Old Stone Fort is located on a peninsula formed by the confluence of the Duck River and the Little Duck River (the section of the Duck River upstream from its confluence with the Little Duck is sometimes called "Barren Fork"). The Duck River forms the peninsula's northwestern boundary, the Little Duck forms the peninsula's southeastern boundary, and a westward bend in the Little Duck forms the peninsula's southern boundary. The walled area of the structure encompasses approximately 50 acres (200,000 m^{2}). (Click for Map)

The Duck River system spills over a limestone-rich shelf of the western Cumberland Plateau known as the Highland Rim. As the Duck and Little Duck approach their convergence, they rapidly drop in elevation and have cut relatively deep gorges around the peninsula upon which the ancient structure is located. A series of substantial waterfalls and whitewater rapids highlight both gorges. The natural water power in these two gorges attracted entrepreneurs and millwrights throughout the 19th century.

The Old Stone Fort is located entirely within Coffee County, just west of Manchester, Tennessee. Old Stone Fort State Archaeological Park encompasses 876 acres (3.55 km^{2}) and is managed by the Tennessee Department of Environment and Conservation.

== The structure of the Old Stone Fort ==
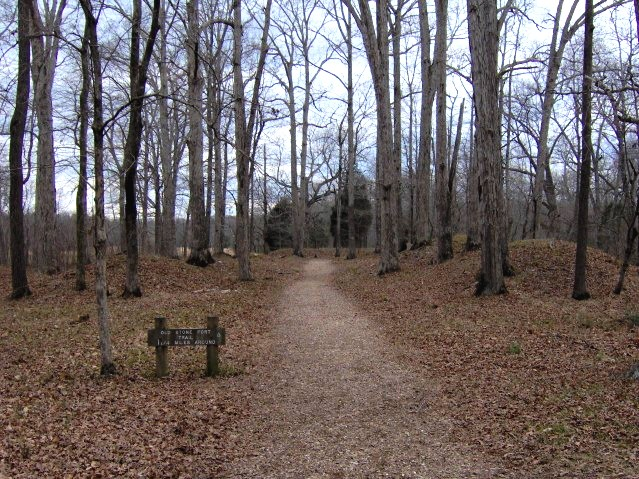
The Old Stone Fort's entrance, with the "pedestal" mounds on the right and left

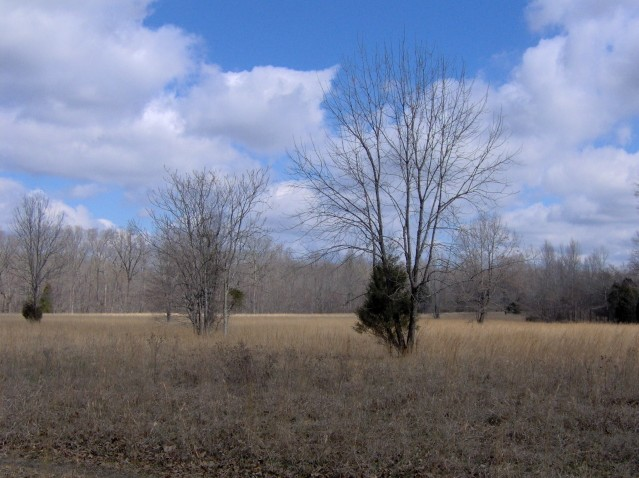
The interior of the Old Stone Fort

The walls of the Old Stone Fort consist of stone and earthwork and are, on average, approximately 4–6 feet high. They originally consisted of an inner and outer layer of crudely stacked rocks and slabs with gravel and earthen fill in between. Over the centuries, the earthen fill has spilled over the rock layers, giving the walls their current mound-like appearance.

The walls can be divided into roughly three sections, with two sections running approximately parallel to the Duck and Little Duck Rivers and a third section running parallel to the southern rim of the peninsula. The sections paralleling the rivers gradually move inward, away from their respective rivers, and approach one another in a pincer-like formation at the northeastern half of the peninsula. Here, both walls terminate just before converging, allowing for a small entrance. Two ancient "pedestal" mounds— one 35 feet (11 m) in diameter and the other 48 feet (15 m) in diameter— are located on either side of the structure's entrance. The entrance continues through a 120-foot (37 m) L-shaped corridor, which opens into the structure's interior.

The fort's northwestern walls (following the Duck River) are approximately 1,394 feet (425 m) long, and the southeastern walls (following the Little Duck) are approximately 1,094 feet (333 m) in length. The southern walls, which are straight except for an area where the ridge bulges outward, are 2,116 feet (645 m) long. Large open sections are found between the southern wall, the northwestern wall, the southern wall, and the southeastern wall. These areas were probably left open because they overlook steep bluffs carved out by the Duck and Little Duck rivers, whose waters probably performed the same function as the mounds.

A substantial ditch, known as the "moat", parallels the southern wall at the base of the ridge. This ditch is a natural feature and is an abandoned river channel. However, it is not known if this channel was artificially kept open in prehistory.

== The Old Stone Fort in recorded history ==
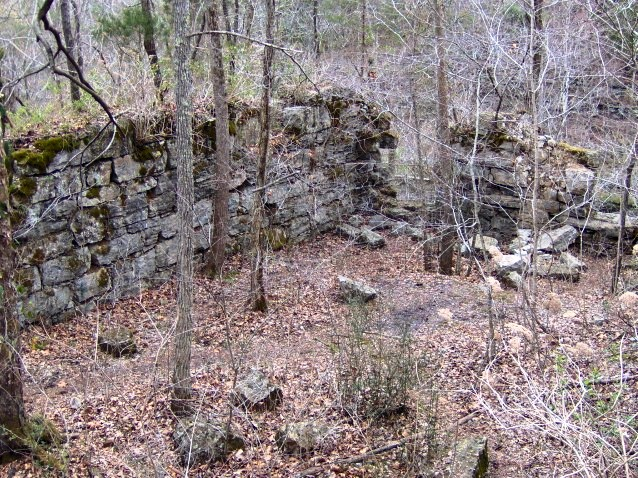
The ruins of the Stone Fort Paper Mill near Big Falls at the Old Stone Fort's northwestern section

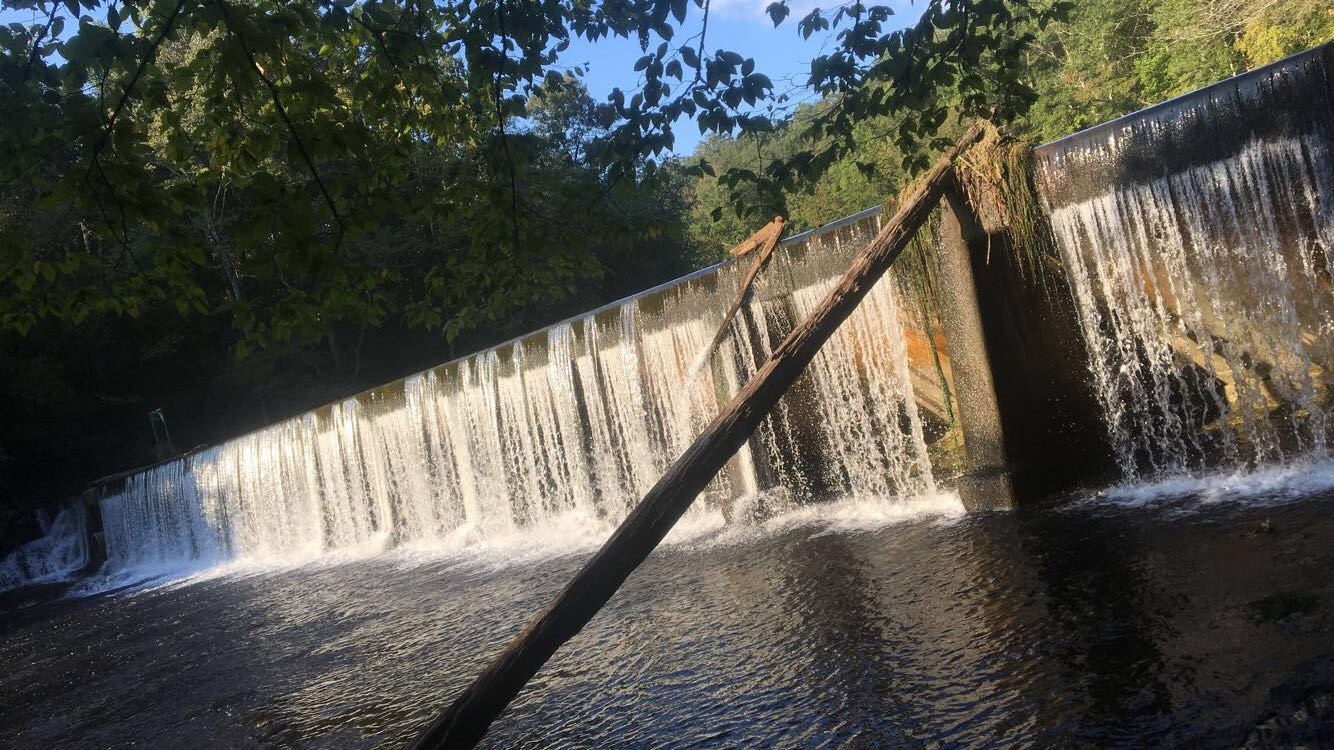
Close up of the falls directly at the beginning of the trail--can be seen from on the patio above the museum, or close up if using a dirt trail adjacent to the concrete walkways

By the time white long hunters and traders arrived in the area in the mid-18th century, a system of well-worn trails traversed the Cumberland Plateau, connecting what is now Middle Tennessee with Georgia and Northern Alabama. One trail passed near the Old Stone Fort, closely following what is now U.S. Route 41. The ancient structure was undoubtedly a vital landmark to early travelers in the Middle Tennessee area.

The Nickajack Expedition, led by Major James Ore in the latter part of the Cherokee–American wars, is believed to have encamped within the Old Stone Fort en route to the Chickamauga towns. The structure also had an important symbolic significance for early Coffee County residents. The county's first court was held at the "Old Stone Fort Tavern" in 1836, and the county seat was laid out upon "Main Stone Fort Creek."

The powerful Duck River made the Old Stone Fort's peninsula an attractive site for mills as early as 1823 when Samuel Murray built a rope factory on the Little Duck River. Although the factory burned in 1847, it was followed by W.S. Whitman's paper mill further downstream in 1852. In 1862, Whitman built a powder factory adjacent to his paper mill to supply the Confederacy during the Civil War; it was destroyed by Union troops the following year. In 1879, the Stone Fort Paper Company built a large mill near Big Falls on the Duck River. The mill supplied paper to newspapers throughout the Southeast— including the Nashville Banner and the Atlanta Constitution— until the early 20th century. The mill's foundations are on the bluffs overlooking Big Falls and can be accessed via the Old Stone Fort Loop Trail.

The property containing the Old Stone Fort was eventually passed to the Chumbley family, who had ties to Stone Fort Paper. The Chumbleys, seeking to protect the Old Stone Fort, passed up numerous private offers for the land on which the ancient structure was located. In 1966, the State of Tennessee purchased 400 acres (1.6 km^{2}) of the Chumbley estate that became the core of Old Stone Fort State Archaeological Park. The Old Stone Fort was added to the National Register of Historic Places in 1973.

== The Old Stone Fort's builders and function ==
=== Who built the Old Stone Fort? ===
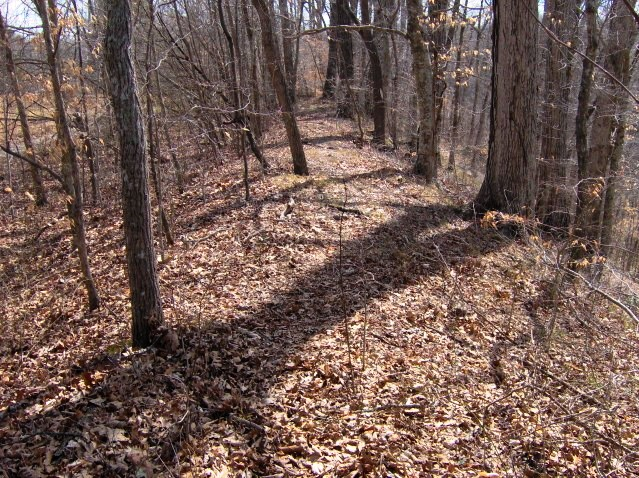
Looking across the Old Stone Fort's south wall

The Old Stone Fort remained a mystery until the University of Tennessee conducted archaeological excavations in 1966. Throughout the 19th and early 20th centuries, various theories tried to identify the builders.

In 1823, the Pioneer, a Jackson, Tennessee newspaper, argued Buccaneers built the Old Stone Fort from Seville after one of their ships wrecked off the coast of Florida and forced them inland. In the mid-20th century, the discoveries at L'Anse aux Meadows and the discovery of apparent Viking artifacts in various parts of North America led many to believe the Vikings built stone structures in the Eastern U.S.A., including the Old Stone Fort.

The first serious investigation of the Old Stone Fort was conducted by Joseph Jones for the Smithsonian Institution in 1876 and uncovered several prehistoric artifacts. He was followed by Tennessee State Archaeologist P.E. Cox in 1928, who dug several trenches and analyzed the fort's composition.

In 1966, after the purchase of the Old Stone Fort, the University of Tennessee Department of Anthropology investigated the structure's origins. Digging a series of trenches and test pits and conducting extensive research, the investigators determined the builders to be Native Americans of the Middle Woodland period. Charles Faulkner, a member of the excavation team, based this on three findings:

- Radiocarbon analysis of charcoal samples found within the structure's walls all dated to approximately 30-430 AD in the Middle Woodland period.
- The structure's composition, setting, and layout are similar to other structures built by Middle Woodland cultures, such as the Hopewell people of Ohio and the Pinson Mound builders in West Tennessee.
- Between 1966 and 1971, five Middle Woodland settlements were discovered within 20 miles (32 km) of the Old Stone Fort, including a substantial habitation area 3 miles (4.8 km) downstream.

The University of Tennessee determined that the fort had been built gradually over several hundred years. The builders are believed to be two distinct local Middle Woodland cultures known as the McFarland and the Owl Hollow cultures, the first starting work in the 1st century AD and the second completing it.

=== Purpose of the Old Stone Fort ===
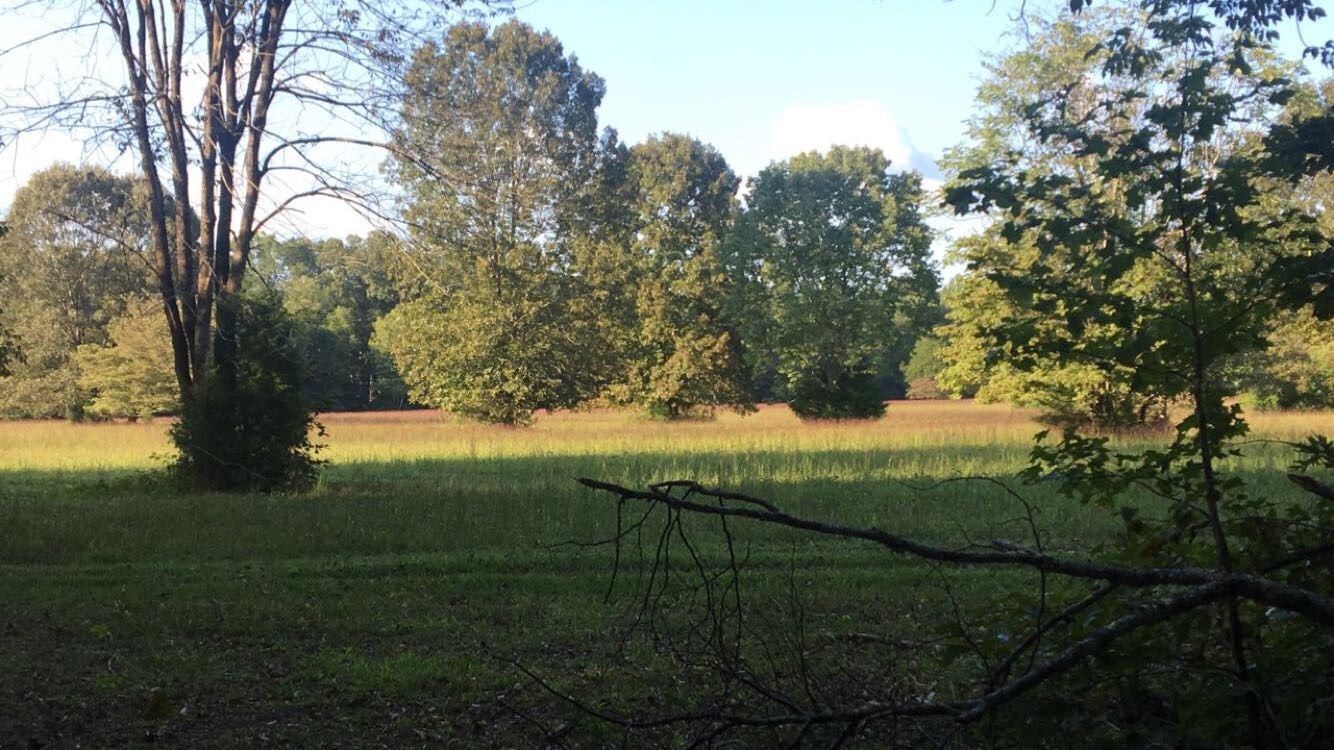
This picture was taken from one of the provided benches between the 7 and 8 map markers towards the end of summer and beginning of fall

For decades, it was largely assumed the structure was used for military defense. However, evidence from the 1966 excavations points more to a religious or ceremonial function. Faulkner based this on the following:

- Defensive structures are typically constructed quickly in response to a threat, but the Old Stone Fort was gradually built over several centuries.
- The walls are not high enough to have been used for defense, and no evidence of a palisade was found.
- The area within the walls is large, and its defense would require much more than a typical Middle Woodland fighting force.
- The 1966 excavations turned up almost no cultural artifacts, which implies the enclosure was kept clean and not continuously inhabited by its builders.

The "moat" that parallels the base of the southwestern edge of the peninsula was originally considered artificial, although researchers now believe it may be a natural dry riverbed.

== The Old Stone Fort Museum ==
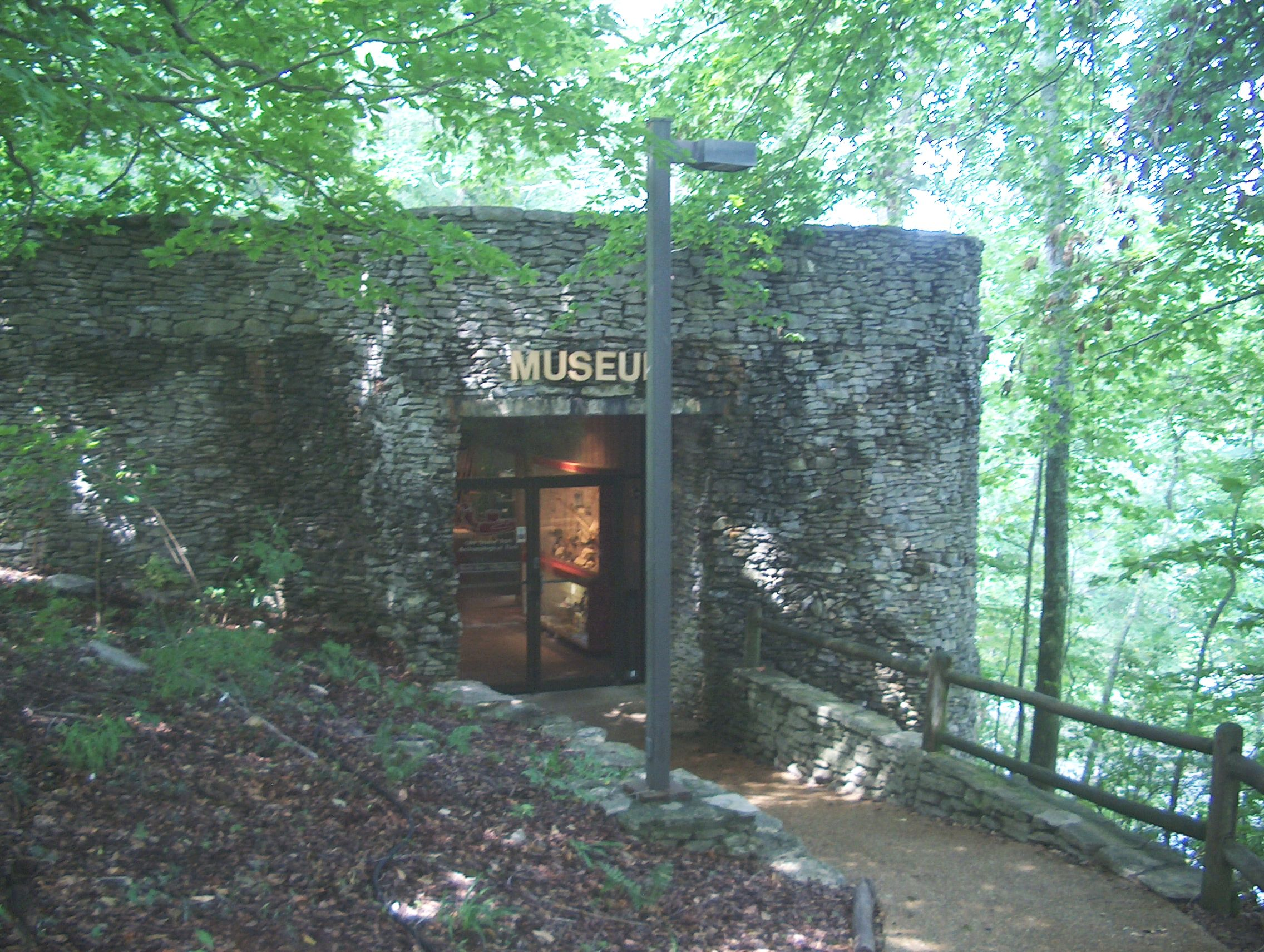
The Old Stone Fort Museum.

The Old Stone Fort Museum, built by Tennessee State Parks, is located near the entrance of Old Stone Fort State Archaeological Park. The museum's exhibits interpret the theories regarding the fort's builders, archaeological excavations at the site, small theater, small welcome/gift shop center, historical lineage of early Native Americans, and the culture of its builders. An observation deck atop the museum displays information about the Old Stone Fort and surrounding rivers and views of the Blue Hole Falls.

== See also ==
- Fort Mountain (Murray County, Georgia)
