= Coffee County, Tennessee =

County in Tennessee, United States

- County
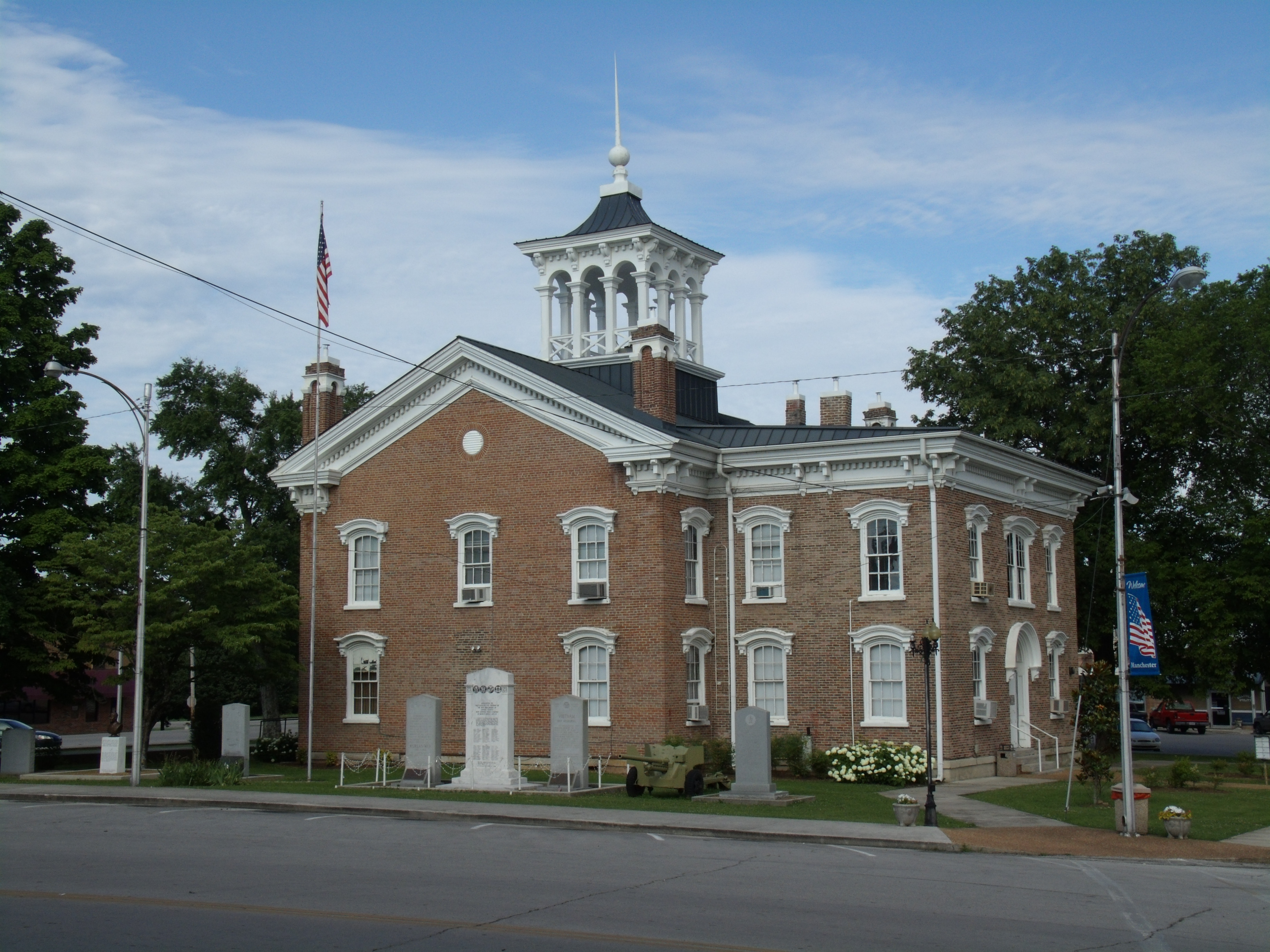
- Coffee County Courthouse in Manchester

- Flag Seal

- Location within the U.S. state of Tennessee
- Coordinates: 35°29′N 86°04′W
- Country: United States
- State: Tennessee
- Founded: January 8, 1836
- Named for: John Coffee
- Seat: Manchester
- Largest city: Tullahoma

Area
  - Total: 435 sq mi (1,130 km^{2})
  - Land: 429 sq mi (1,110 km^{2})
  - Water: 5.6 sq mi (15 km^{2}) 1.3%

Population (2020)
  - Total: 57,889
  - Estimate (2025): 62,419 ▲
  - Density: 123/sq mi (47/km^{2})
- Time zone: UTC−6 (Central)
  - Summer (DST): UTC−5 (CDT)
- Congressional district: 4th
- Website: www.coffeecountytn.gov

Coffee County is a county located in the central part of the state of Tennessee, in the United States. As of the 2020 census, the county's population was 57,889. Its county seat is Manchester. Coffee County is part of the Tullahoma–Manchester, TN Micropolitan Statistical Area. It is also part of Middle Tennessee, one of the three Grand Divisions of the state.

== History ==
Coffee County was formed in 1836 from parts of Bedford, Warren, and Franklin counties. It was named for John Coffee, a prominent planter, land speculator, and militia officer.

In the period after the Reconstruction era ended (1877) and into the early 20th century, whites in Coffee County committed eight lynchings of blacks. This was the fifth-highest total of any county in the state; however, three other counties also had eight lynchings each.

=== Century Farms ===
Coffee County has twelve Century Farms, the classification for farms that have been operating for more than 100 years. The oldest Century Farm is Shamrock Acres, founded in 1818. Other Century Farms include:

- Beckman Farm
- Brown Dairy Farm
- Carden Farm
- Crouch-Ramsey Farm
- Freeze Farm
- The Homestead Farm
- Jacobs Farm
- Long Farm
- Shamrock Acres
- Sunrise View Farm
- Thomas Farm, site of the Farrar Distillery

== Geography ==
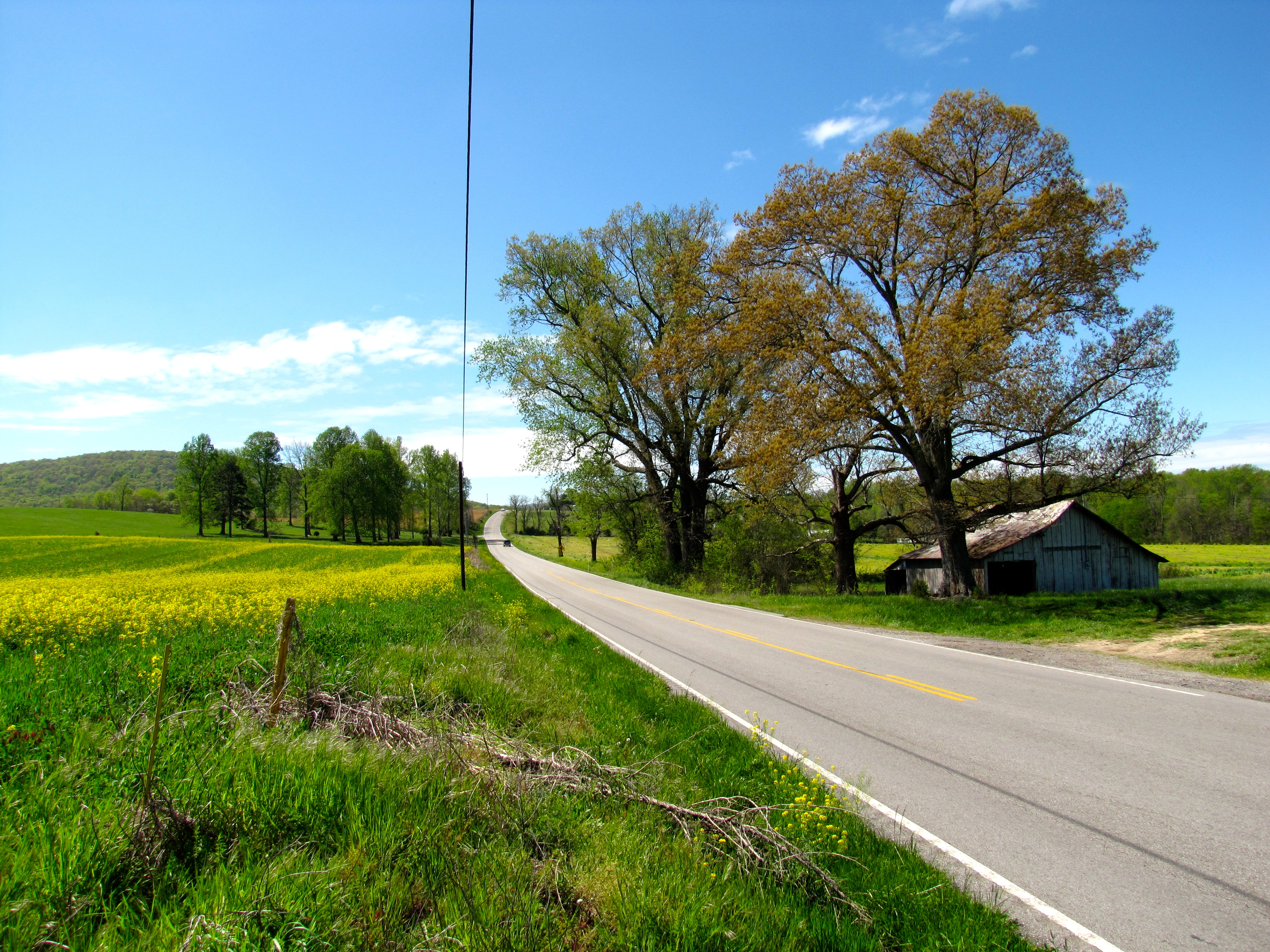
State Route 127 near Hillsboro

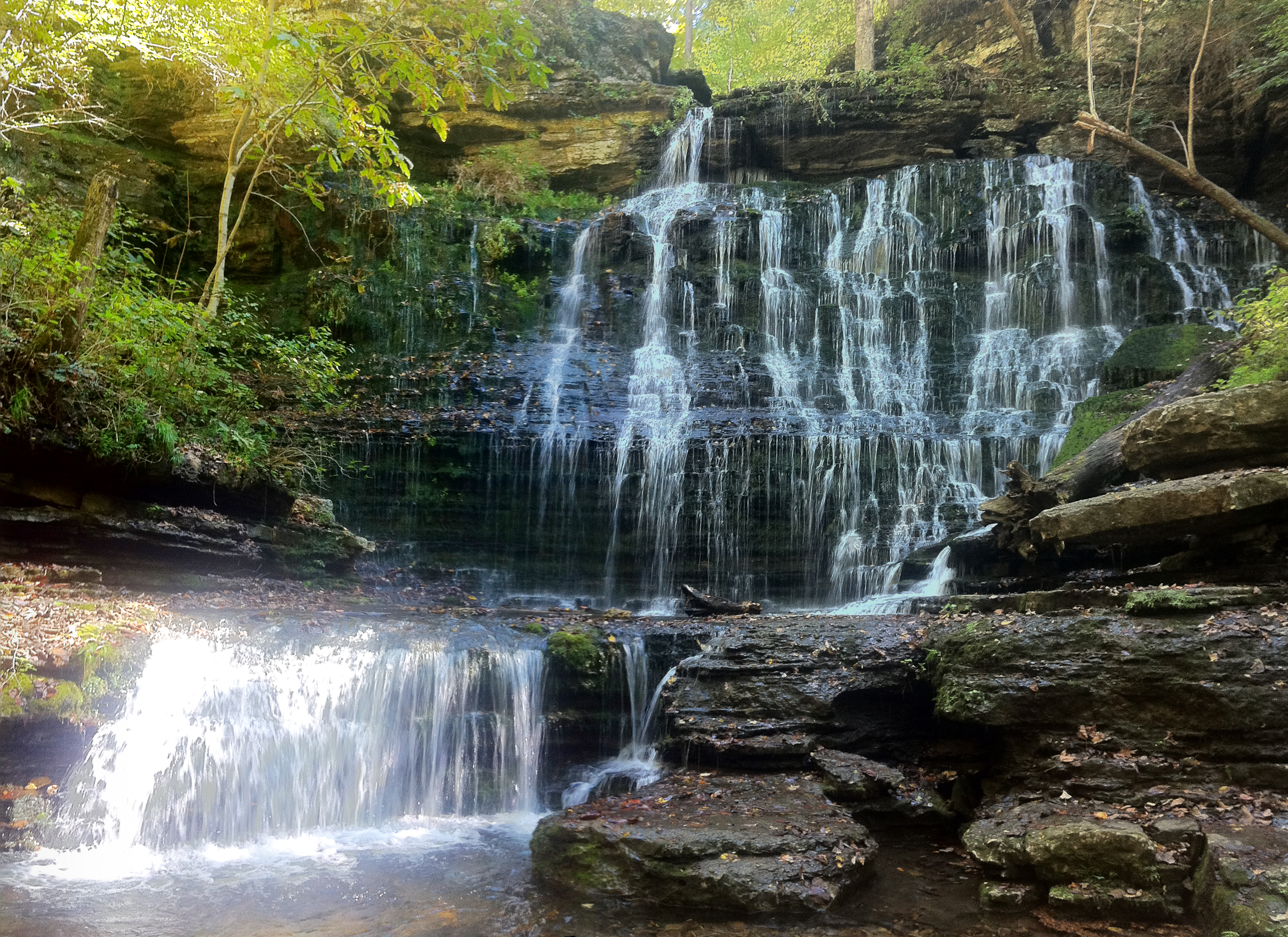
Machine Falls at Short Springs State Natural Area

According to the U.S. Census Bureau, the county has a total area of 435 square miles (1,130 km^{2}), of which 429 square miles (1,110 km^{2}) is land and 5.6 square miles (15 km^{2}) (1.3%) is water.

=== Adjacent counties ===
- Cannon County (north)
- Warren County (northeast)
- Grundy County (east)
- Franklin County (south)
- Moore County (southwest)
- Bedford County (west)
- Rutherford County (northwest)

=== Major highways ===
- Interstate 24
- U.S. Route 41
- U.S. Route 41A

=== State protected areas ===
- Arnold Engineering Development Complex Wildlife Management Area (jointly managed by TWRA and USAF)
- Bark Camp Barrens Wildlife Management Area
- Hickory Flats Wildlife Management Area
- Maple Hill Wildlife Management Area
- May Prairie State Natural Area
- Normandy Wildlife Management Area (part)
- Old Stone Fort State Archaeological Park
- Short Springs State Natural Area

== Demographics ==
Historical population
Census	Pop.	Note	%±
1840	8,184		—
1850	8,351		2.0%
1860	9,689		16.0%
1870	10,237		5.7%
1880	12,894		26.0%
1890	13,827		7.2%
1900	15,574		12.6%
1910	15,625		0.3%
1920	17,344		11.0%
1930	16,801		−3.1%
1940	18,959		12.8%
1950	23,049		21.6%
1960	28,603		24.1%
1970	32,572		13.9%
1980	38,311		17.6%
1990	40,339		5.3%
2000	48,014		19.0%
2010	52,796		10.0%
2020	57,889		9.6%
2025 (est.)	62,419	▲	7.8%
U.S. Decennial Census; 1790-1960 1900-1990; 1990-2000 2010-2014

=== Racial and ethnic composition ===
Coffee County, Tennessee – Racial and ethnic composition Note: the US Census treats Hispanic/Latino as an ethnic category. This table excludes Latinos from the racial categories and assigns them to a separate category. Hispanics/Latinos may be of any race.
Race / ethnicity (NH = Non-Hispanic)	Pop 1980	Pop 1990	Pop 2000	Pop 2010	Pop 2020	% 1980	% 1990	% 2000	% 2010	% 2020
White alone (NH)	36,534	38,257	44,324	47,539	48,983	95.36%	94.84%	92.31%	90.04%	84.62%
Black or African American alone (NH)	1,331	1,492	1,689	1,820	2,097	3.47%	3.70%	3.52%	3.45%	3.62%
Native American or Alaska Native alone (NH)	29	81	130	145	145	0.08%	0.20%	0.27%	0.27%	0.25%
Asian alone (NH)	164	245	346	449	611	0.43%	0.61%	0.72%	0.85%	1.06%
Native Hawaiian or Pacific Islander alone (NH)	x	x	13	17	37	x	x	0.03%	0.03%	0.06%
Other race alone (NH)	36	3	27	23	171	0.09%	0.01%	0.06%	0.04%	0.30%
Mixed race or Multiracial (NH)	x	x	434	796	2,586	x	x	0.90%	1.51%	4.47%
Hispanic or Latino (any race)	217	261	1,051	2,007	3,259	0.57%	0.65%	2.19%	3.80%	5.63%
Total	38,311	40,339	48,014	52,796	57,889	100.00%	100.00%	100.00%	100.00%	100.00%

=== 2020 census ===
As of the 2020 census, the county had a population of 57,889 people, 22,842 households, and 14,777 families residing in the county. The median age was 40.7 years; 23.0% of residents were under the age of 18 and 18.5% of residents were 65 years of age or older. For every 100 females there were 95.8 males, and for every 100 females age 18 and over there were 93.3 males age 18 and over.

The racial makeup of the county was 85.8% White, 3.7% Black or African American, 0.4% American Indian and Alaska Native, 1.1% Asian, 0.1% Native Hawaiian and Pacific Islander, 2.7% from some other race, and 6.3% from two or more races. Hispanic or Latino residents of any race comprised 5.6% of the population.

53.9% of residents lived in urban areas, while 46.1% lived in rural areas.

There were 22,842 households in the county, of which 30.8% had children under the age of 18 living in them. Of all households, 47.7% were married-couple households, 18.4% were households with a male householder and no spouse or partner present, and 26.4% were households with a female householder and no spouse or partner present. About 27.3% of all households were made up of individuals and 12.3% had someone living alone who was 65 years of age or older.

There were 24,946 housing units, of which 8.4% were vacant. Among occupied housing units, 68.8% were owner-occupied and 31.2% were renter-occupied. The homeowner vacancy rate was 1.7% and the rental vacancy rate was 6.1%.

=== 2000 census ===
As of the census of 2000, there were 48,014 people, 18,885 households, and 13,597 families residing in the county. The population density was 112 people per square mile (43 people/km^{2}). There were 20,746 housing units at an average density of 48 units per square mile (19/km^{2}). The racial makeup of the county was 93.43% White, 3.59% Black or African American, 0.30% Native American, 0.74% Asian, 0.03% Pacific Islander, 0.91% from other races, and 1.00% from two or more races. 2.19% of the population were Hispanic or Latino of any race.

There were 18,885 households, out of which 32.40% had children under the age of 18 living with them, 56.90% were married couples living together, 11.10% had a female householder with no husband present, and 28.00% were non-families. 24.30% of all households were made up of individuals, and 10.30% had someone living alone who was 65 years of age or older. The average household size was 2.50 and the average family size was 2.96.

In the county, the population was spread out, with 25.10% under the age of 18, 8.30% from 18 to 24, 28.40% from 25 to 44, 23.60% from 45 to 64, and 14.60% who were 65 years of age or older. The median age was 38 years. For every 100 females, there were 95.10 males. For every 100 females age 18 and over, there were 92.30 males.

The median income for a household in the county was $34,898, and the median income for a family was $40,228. Males had a median income of $32,732 versus $21,014 for females. The per capita income for the county was $18,137. About 10.90% of families and 14.30% of the population were below the poverty line, including 17.80% of those under age 18 and 15.20% of those age 65 or over.

== Events ==
The Bonnaroo Music Festival has been held annually in the county since 2002.

== Notable people ==
- Dustin Lynch, country singer.
- DJ Qualls, film actor.
- Betty Sain, horse trainer and breeder.
- J. Stanley Rogers, Tennessee House of Representatives majority leader.
- Ally Walker, actress.

== Points of interest ==
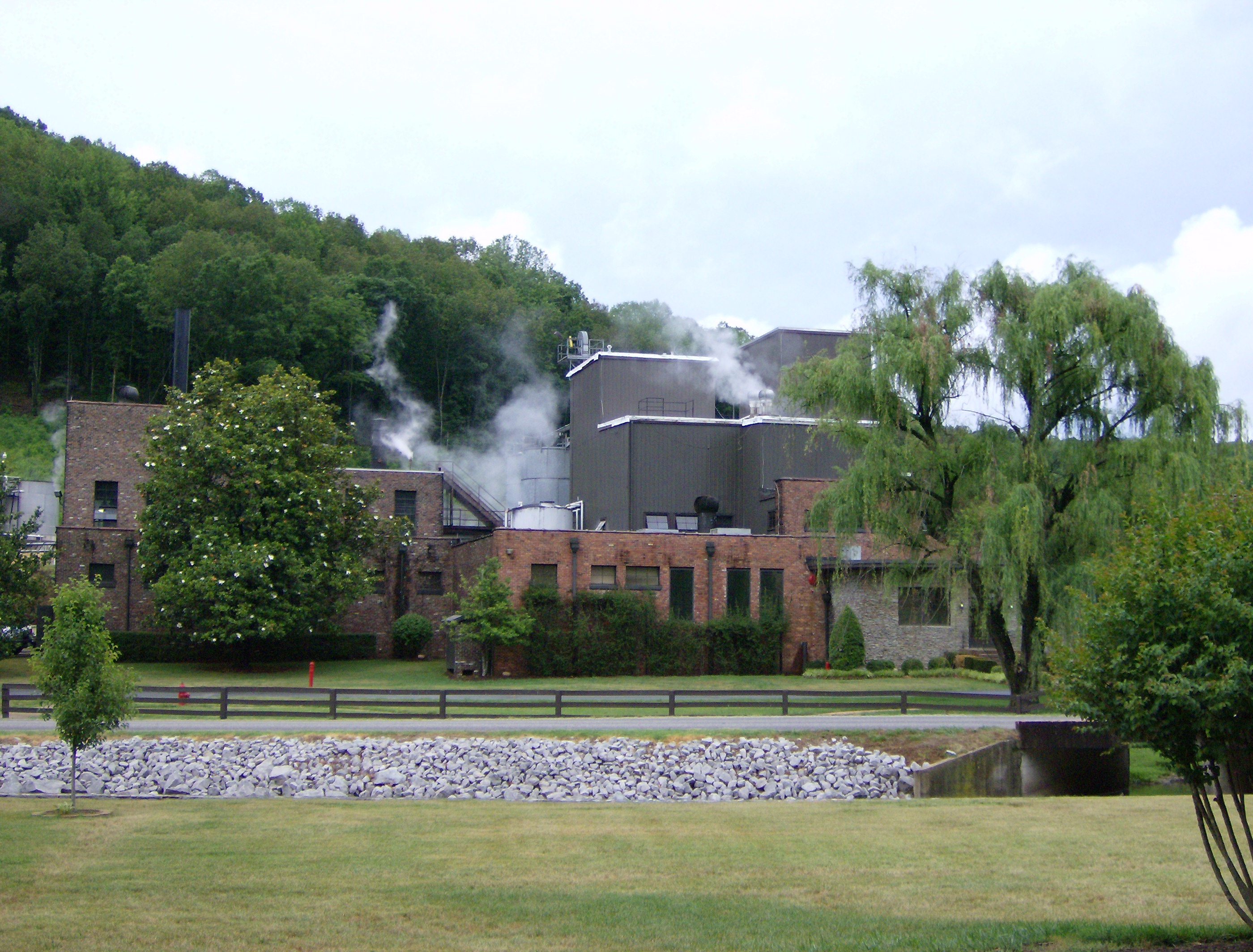
George Dickel Distillery

- Arnold Engineering Development Complex
- George Dickel Tennessee whiskey distillery
- Old Stone Fort – part of Old Stone Fort State Archaeological Park, just west of Manchester
- Short Springs State Natural Area
- Farrar Distillery – on the U.S. National Register of Historic Places

== Communities ==
=== Cities ===
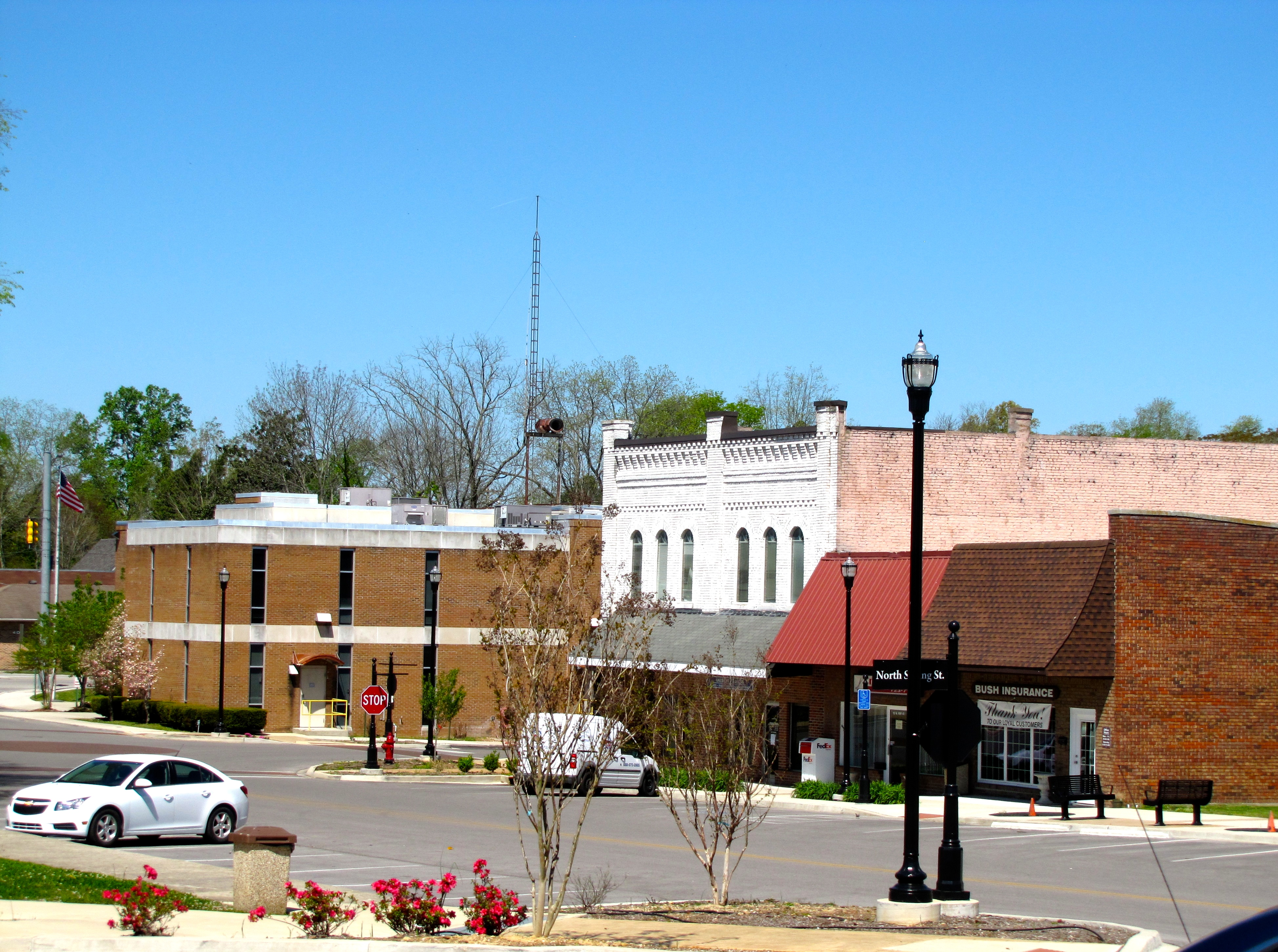
Manchester

- Manchester (county seat)
- Tullahoma

=== Census-designated places ===
- Hillsboro
- Lakewood Park
- New Union

=== Unincorporated communities ===
- Beech Grove
- Belmont
- Blanton's Chapel
- Farrar Hill
- Fredonia
- Fudgearound
- Noah
- Pocahontas
- Shady Grove
- Summitville

== Politics ==
Coffee County is a Republican stronghold. The last Democrat to carry this county was Bill Clinton in 1996.

United States presidential election results for Coffee County, Tennessee
Year	Republican		Democratic		Third party(ies)	
Year	No.	%	No.	%	No.	%
1912	521	22.49%	1,705	73.59%	91	3.93%
1916	489	20.84%	1,837	78.30%	20	0.85%
1920	822	28.69%	2,043	71.31%	0	0.00%
1924	488	21.80%	1,691	75.52%	60	2.68%
1928	1,126	48.72%	1,175	50.84%	10	0.43%
1932	430	17.92%	1,950	81.25%	20	0.83%
1936	408	15.88%	2,148	83.58%	14	0.54%
1940	424	15.63%	2,277	83.96%	11	0.41%
1944	568	17.35%	2,703	82.56%	3	0.09%
1948	599	16.63%	2,041	56.68%	961	26.69%
1952	2,110	37.25%	3,537	62.44%	18	0.32%
1956	2,389	32.42%	4,930	66.90%	50	0.68%
1960	3,058	39.79%	4,555	59.26%	73	0.95%
1964	3,012	30.58%	6,837	69.42%	0	0.00%
1968	3,337	29.87%	3,040	27.21%	4,794	42.91%
1972	6,416	66.18%	2,973	30.67%	306	3.16%
1976	3,848	32.05%	8,017	66.78%	140	1.17%
1980	5,454	40.72%	7,612	56.84%	327	2.44%
1984	7,695	57.14%	5,691	42.26%	82	0.61%
1988	7,837	57.56%	5,686	41.76%	92	0.68%
1992	6,047	35.48%	8,534	50.07%	2,463	14.45%
1996	7,038	43.18%	7,951	48.78%	1,312	8.05%
2000	8,788	49.40%	8,741	49.14%	259	1.46%
2004	11,793	58.48%	8,243	40.87%	131	0.65%
2008	13,250	63.73%	7,132	34.30%	408	1.96%
2012	13,023	67.62%	5,870	30.48%	366	1.90%
2016	14,417	72.19%	4,743	23.75%	811	4.06%
2020	17,883	73.65%	5,705	23.49%	694	2.86%
2024	19,174	76.91%	5,440	21.82%	318	1.28%

== See also ==
- Coffee County Central High School
- National Register of Historic Places listings in Coffee County, Tennessee
- The Saturday Independent
