= Manchester, Tennessee =

Manchester
- City
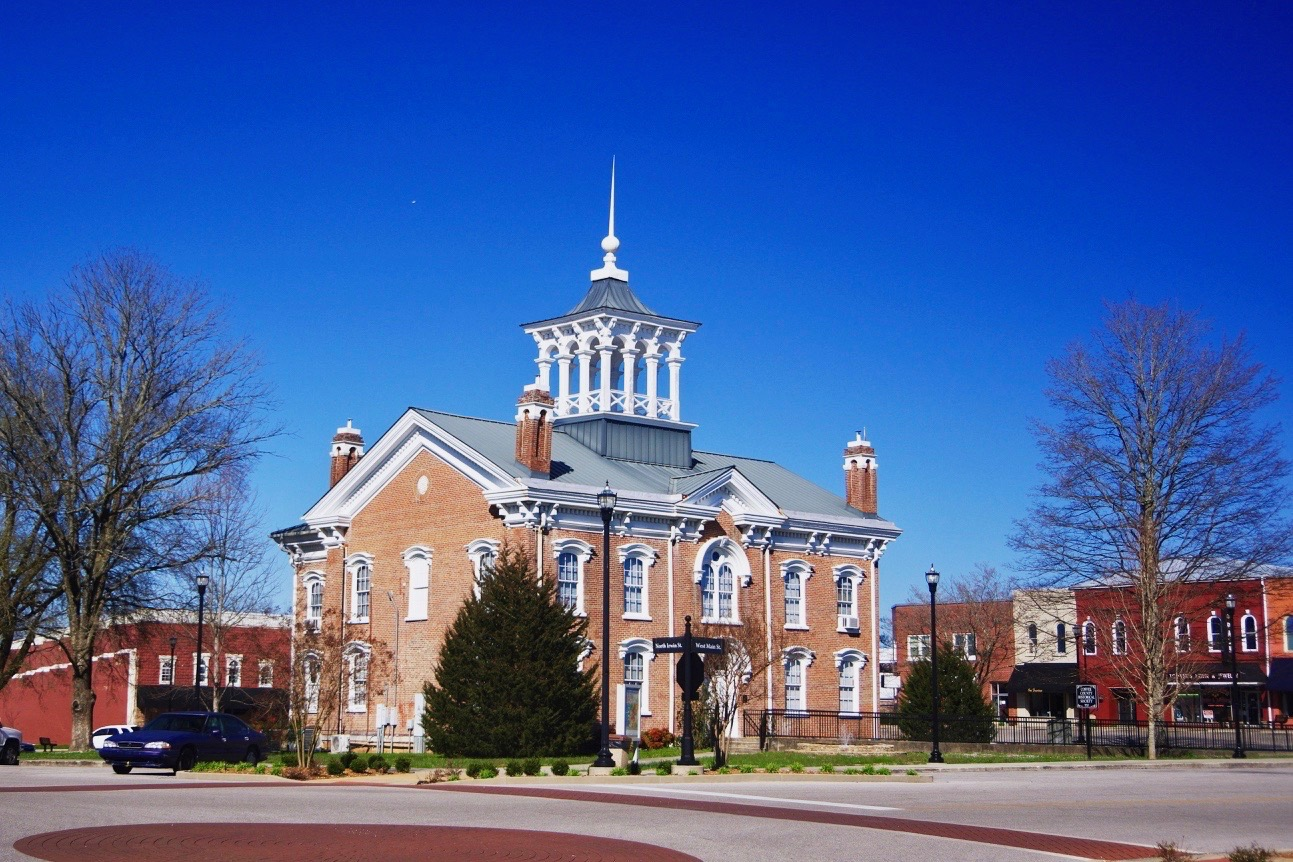
- Coffee County Courthouse in Manchester

- Location of Manchester in Coffee County, Tennessee.
- Coordinates: 35°28′24″N 86°5′8″W
- Country: United States
- State: Tennessee
- County: Coffee

Government
  - Mayor: Joey Hobbs

Area
  - Total: 15.35 sq mi (39.75 km^{2})
  - Land: 15.32 sq mi (39.69 km^{2})
  - Water: 0.023 sq mi (0.06 km^{2})
- Elevation: 1,060 ft (320 m)

Population (2020)
  - Total: 12,212
  - Density: 797.0/sq mi (307.71/km^{2})
- Time zone: UTC-6 (Central (CST))
  - Summer (DST): UTC-5 (CDT)
- ZIP codes: 37349, 37355
- Area code: 931
- FIPS code: 47-45500
- GNIS feature ID: 1292561
- Website: www.cityofmanchestertn.com

Manchester is a city and the county seat of Coffee County, Tennessee, United States. The population was 12,213 at the 2020 census.

Manchester is part of the Tullahoma micropolitan area.

Since 2002, Manchester has been the host city for the annual Bonnaroo Music Festival. The city's population swells to nearly 100,000 people for the four-day event, for which people travel across the country to camp and enjoy continuous and diverse music.

== History ==
A post office called Manchester has been in operation since 1817. The city was named after Manchester, in England. According to historians, "A small village, “Mitchellsville” was already in existence near the proposed site for the new county seat, but when the new county was formed, it was renamed “Manchester” after the industrial city of Manchester, England. Because of the abundance of water power, provided by the “Little Duck” & “Big Duck” Rivers, which flow through Manchester, it was hoped that it also would become a great industrial city."

Long-time Mayor Lonnie J. Norman died of COVID-19 in 2020, during the COVID-19 pandemic. Kanye West tweeted his condolences.

== Geography ==
Manchester is located slightly south of the center of Coffee County at 35°28′24″N 86°5′8″W (35.473337, -86.085512). Interstate 24 passes through the northeast side of the city, with access from Exits 110, 111, and 114. Exit "112" was a "temporary exit" directly from the shoulder of I-24 into the Bonnaroo Music Festival site. From Exit 111 it is 68 miles (109 km) southeast to Chattanooga and 65 miles (105 km) northwest to Nashville. U.S. Route 41 passes through the center of town as Hillsboro Boulevard; US 41 runs parallel to I-24 and leads eight miles (13 km) southeast to Hillsboro and northwest five miles (8.0 km) to I-24 Exit 105. Tennessee State Route 55 passes through the east side of Manchester as McArthur Street; it leads northeast 25 miles (40 km) to McMinnville and southwest 12 miles (19 km) to Tullahoma.

The Little Duck River begins at the confluence of Hunt Creek and Huckleberry Creek and passes through the city before joining the Duck River just west of the city limits. The Duck River, a tributary of the Tennessee River, passes through the northwest corner of the city. Both rivers drop over waterfalls above their confluence, within Old Stone Fort State Archaeological Park.

According to the United States Census Bureau, the city has a total area of 14.2 square miles (36.7 km^{2}), of which 14.1 square miles (36.6 km^{2}) is land and 0.04 square miles (0.1 km^{2}), or 0.24%, is water.

== Demographics ==
Historical population
Census	Pop.	Note	%±
1860	316		—
1870	500		58.2%
1880	438		−12.4%
1890	621		41.8%
1910	963		—
1920	1,114		15.7%
1930	1,227		10.1%
1940	1,715		39.8%
1950	2,341		36.5%
1960	3,930		67.9%
1970	6,208		58.0%
1980	7,250		16.8%
1990	7,709		6.3%
2000	8,294		7.6%
2010	10,102		21.8%
2020	12,212		20.9%
2025 (est.)	13,776	▲	12.8%

=== 2020 census ===
As of the 2020 census, Manchester had a population of 12,212 and 2,582 families. The median age was 36.6 years, with 24.6% of residents under the age of 18 and 17.1% of residents 65 years of age or older. For every 100 females there were 92.6 males, and for every 100 females age 18 and over there were 88.6 males age 18 and over.

96.6% of residents lived in urban areas, while 3.4% lived in rural areas. There were 4,825 households in Manchester, of which 32.7% had children under the age of 18 living in them. Of all households, 40.8% were married-couple households, 19.9% were households with a male householder and no spouse or partner present, and 31.1% were households with a female householder and no spouse or partner present. About 31.6% of all households were made up of individuals and 13.5% had someone living alone who was 65 years of age or older.

There were 5,218 housing units, of which 7.5% were vacant. The homeowner vacancy rate was 2.5% and the rental vacancy rate was 6.8%.

Racial composition as of the 2020 census
Race	Number	Percent
White	9,831	80.5%
Black or African American	484	4.0%
American Indian and Alaska Native	75	0.6%
Asian	215	1.8%
Native Hawaiian and Other Pacific Islander	6	0.0%
Some other race	653	5.3%
Two or more races	948	7.8%
Hispanic or Latino (of any race)	1,274	10.4%

=== 2000 census ===
As of the census of 2000, there was a population of 8,294, with 3,326 households and 2,148 families residing in the city. The population density was 752.0 inhabitants per square mile (290.3/km^{2}). There were 3,633 housing units at an average density of 329.4 per square mile (127.2/km^{2}). The racial makeup of the city was 92.66% White, 3.91% African American, 0.37% Native American, 1.21% Asian, 1.00% from other races, and 0.86% from two or more races. Hispanic or Latino of any race were 3.28% of the population.

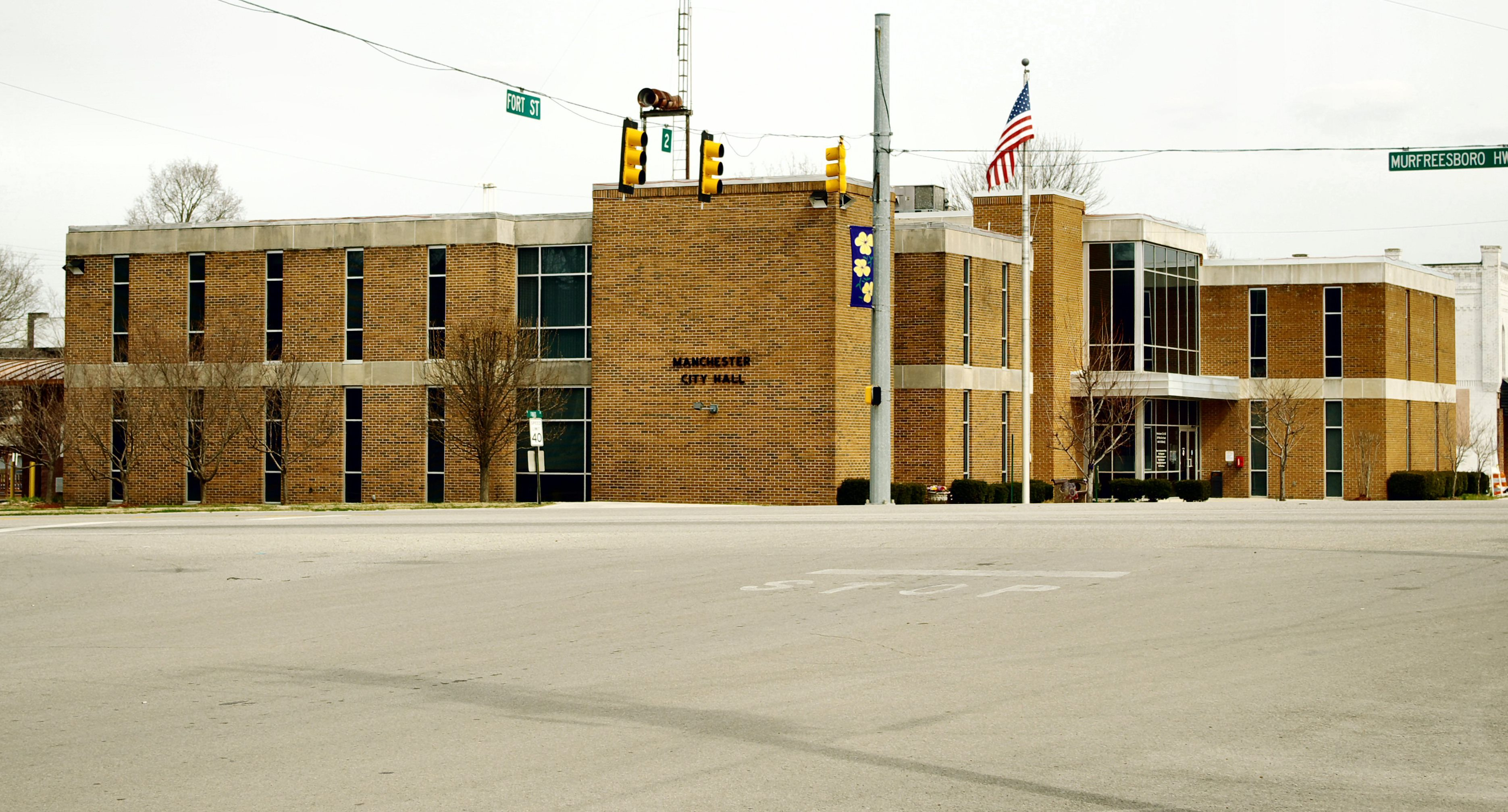
Manchester City Hall

There were 3,326 households, out of which 27.8% had children under the age of 18 living with them, 48.7% were married couples living together, 11.9% had a female householder with no husband present, and 35.4% were non-families. 31.0% of all households were made up of individuals, and 14.4% had someone living alone who was 65 years of age or older. The average household size was 2.35 and the average family size was 2.91.

The age of the population was spread out, with 22.5% under the age of 18, 8.3% from 18 to 24, 27.7% from 25 to 44, 22.1% from 45 to 64, and 19.4% who were 65 years of age or older. The median age was 39 years. For every 100 females, there were 88.3 males. For every 100 females age 18 and over, there were 86.0 males.

The median income for a household in the city was $31,983, and the median income for a family was $38,404. Males had a median income of $31,708 versus $21,380 for females. The per capita income for the city was $17,168. About 13.1% of families and 17.6% of the population were below the poverty line, including 22.0% of those under age 18 and 20.0% of those age 65 or over.

== Notable people ==
- DJ Qualls, film actor, Road Trip, The New Guy, Hustle & Flow.
- Betty Sain, horse trainer and breeder
- J. Stanley Rogers, Tennessee House of Representatives majority leader
- John H. Ross, WWII pilot

== Points of interest ==
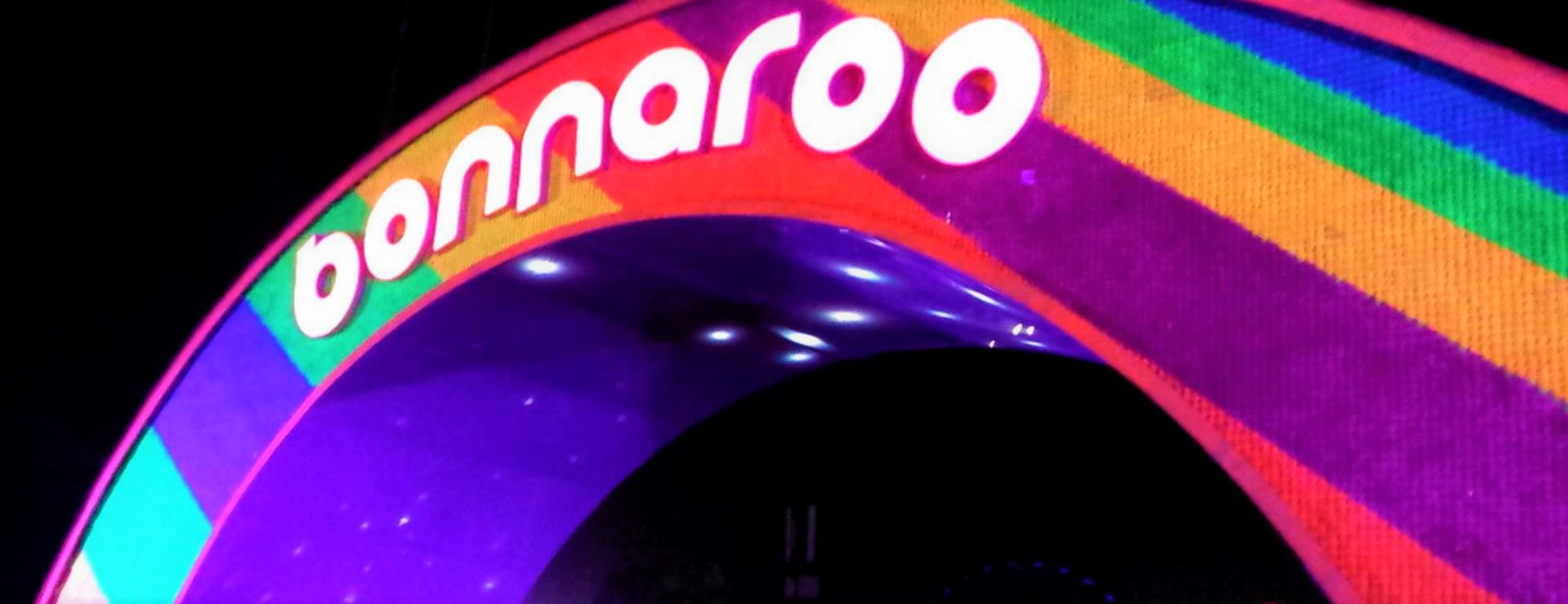
Manchester hosts the Bonnaroo Music and Arts Festival annually.

- Old Stone Fort, part of Old Stone Fort State Archaeological Park, adjacent to the western city limits
- Great Stage Park is a 650-acre (2.6 km^{2}) outdoor event space. Since 2002 it has been home to the Bonnaroo Music and Arts Festival, one of the 10 largest outdoor festivals in North America.
