= Tennessee House of Representatives 26th district =

State legislative district in Tennessee

Tennessee's 26th State House of Representatives district
- Map of Tennessee House districts with the 26th District shaded in red
Representative
Greg Martin; R–Signal Mountain
since 2021
- Demographics: 84.7% White; 5.8% Black; 4.1% Hispanic; 1.6% Asian; 3% Multiracial
- Population (2024): 76,719

The Tennessee House of Representatives 26th district is one of the 99 legislative districts in the lower house of the Tennessee General Assembly. The district is located in East Tennessee and covers central and northern Hamilton County. Greg Martin has represented the district since 2021.

== Geography ==
The district includes northern parts of Chattanooga as well as the areas of Lake Shore Estates and Harbour Woods in Harrison. It also stretches north to include Lakesite and other unincorporated areas along Chickamauga Lake such as Middle Valley and Sale Creek. Said lake forms much of the eastern border of the district.

== Demographics ==
The Tennessee Comptroller estimates the population as of 2024 at 76,719.

- 84.7% of the district is White
- 5.8% of the district is Black
- 4.1% of the district is Hispanic
- 1.6% of the district is Asian
- 3% of the district is Two or more races

Detailed demographic information is also available through Census Reporter.

== History ==
The 88th Tennessee General Assembly was the first in which all districts were numbered. At the 88th GA, it was in Hamilton County. From the 89th-93rd GAs, it was made up of parts of Hamilton and Meigs counties. Since the 94th GA, the 27th district has been part of Hamilton County.

== List of Representatives ==
Representative	Party	Years of Service	General Assembly	Hometown
Greg Martin	Republican	2021 - present	112th-114th	Hixson
Robin Smith	Republican	2019-2020	111th	Hixson
Gerald McCormick	Republican	2005-2018	104th-110th	Chattanooga
Bobby Wood	Republican	1977-2004	90th-103rd	Harrison
Claude Ramsey	Republican	1975-1976	89th	Hixson
Ray White	Republican	1973-1974	88th	Harrison
