= Camp Okawehna =

Coordinates: 35.901°N 87.268°W

Camp Okawehna is a summer camp, held for six days in early June, located at Cedar Crest Campground in Lyles, Tennessee (within 50 miles of Nashville) for children and teens with kidney disease including transplant and dialysis patients. A fully operational hemodialysis facility is set up at the campground.

It has been in operation since 1974 and is run by the non profit organization Dialysis Clinic, Inc. Participants come from the south and mid-south of the US.

== See also ==
- Camp Discovery
