= DSI =

DSI may refer to:

== Abbreviations ==
- DontStayIn, a social networking website

== Airport ==
- IATA airport code for Destin Executive Airport

== Businesses ==
DSI is an initialism for the following companies:

- Daiichi Sankyo, Incorporated
- Dave Smith Instruments, an American synthesizer company
- Deep Space Industries, American-based asteroid mining startup
- Deep Springs International
- Delphi Schools, Inc.
- Delphine Software International, a now bankrupt software company
- Destination Software, Inc., a video game company
- Distinctive Software Inc., a video game company
- Diversified Specialty Institute Holdings, Inc., a US-based healthcare group
- Drivetrain Systems International, an Australian automotive transmissions manufacturer
- State Hydraulic Works (Turkey) (Turkish: Devlet Su İşleri (DSİ)), a state agency in Turkey

== Education ==
- Decision Sciences Institute, a professional association focusing on the application of quantitative research and qualitative research to the decision problems of individuals, organizations, and society
- Deutsche Schule Istanbul, a private high school in Istanbul

== Gaming ==
- Dead Space Ignition, a video game in the Dead Space series
- Nintendo DSi, Nintendo's third iteration of the Nintendo DS handheld game console

== Music ==
- Dope Stars Inc., an industrial metal band formed in 2002

== Organizations and institutions ==
- Special Intervention Detachment, an Algerian Special Forces Unit of the National gendarmerie for counter-terrorism actions
- Data Storage Institute, a Singaporean national research institute
- Department of Special Investigation, a Thai government organization for special investigation
- Dienst Speciale Interventies, a Dutch government organization for counter-terrorism actions
- DSI Samson Group, a Sri Lankan conglomerate
- Deutsches SOFIA Institut, an institute helping develop SOFIA
- Identification Services Bureau, Portuguese abbreviation of Direcção dos Serviços de Identificação

== Police ==
- Detective Superintendent

== Science, mathematics and medicine ==
- Depolarization-induced suppression of inhibition, a type of modulation of inhibitory neurotransmission
- Diffused Surface Illumination, a multi-touch technique using edge lighting
- Digital sequence information, information from sequenced DNA and other large molecules such as RNA or proteins, which can be processed digitally
- The Stuttgart Database of Scientific Illustrators 1450–1950

== Technology ==
- Data storage interrupt, the name used for a segmentation fault on PowerPC-based processors
- Data Stream Interface, computer network protocol to run Apple Filing Protocol over TCP
- Delay slot instruction, a term from computer architecture
- Digital Serial Interface, a protocol for controlling of lighting in buildings
- Display Serial Interface, a serial protocol for mobile display devices
- Diverterless supersonic inlet, a type of jet engine air intake

== Other uses ==
- Dance Club Songs, a former Billboard chart with the shortcut "DSI"
