= List of dialysis providers in the United States =

List of United States dialysis providers:

- Abramson Center for Jewish Life
- American Renal Associates
- American Renal Care
- Atlantic Dialysis Management
- BMA (BioMedical Applications)
- Centers for Dialysis Care
- Concerto Renal Services
- DaVita Inc.
- Diversified Specialty Institute Holdings, Inc.
- Dialysis Clinic, Inc.
- Evergreen Nephrology
- Fresenius Medical Care
- Holy Cross Renal Center
- Legacy Dialysis
- Liberty Home Dialysis
- National Renal Care
- Northwest Kidney Centers
- Olympus Dialysis
- Premier Dialysis
- Rendevor Dialysis
- Rogosin Institute
- Sanderling Renal Services
- Satellite Healthcare
- US Renal Care
