= CPRT =

CPRT may refer to:

- Cancer Prevention Research Trust
- Copart, auction company based in Texas
- Cypriot syllabary, ISO 15924 code
