= Tennessee House of Representatives 63rd district =

State legislative district in Tennessee

Tennessee's 63rd State House of Representatives district
- Map of Tennessee House districts with the 63rd District shaded in red
Representative
Jake McCalmon; R–Franklin
since 2023
- Demographics: 78.3% White; 4.2% Black; 3.9% Hispanic; 8.6% Asian; 3.8% Multiracial
- Population (2024): 80,383

The Tennessee House of Representatives 63rd district is one of the 99 legislative districts in the lower house of the Tennessee General Assembly. The district is located in Middle Tennessee and covers the east of Williamson County. The district includes southeasterly parts of Brentwood and Franklin. It also includes Nolensville and part of Thompson's Station. Jake McCalmon has represented the district since 2023.

== Demographics ==
The Tennessee Comptroller estimates the population as of 2024 at 80,383. Median household income is more than double the Tennessee median of $69,595, at $164,797.

- 78.3% of the district is White
- 4.2% of the district is Black
- 3.9% of the district is Hispanic
- 8.6% of the district is Asian
- 1.1% of the district is some other race alone
- 3.8% of the district is Two or more races

Detailed demographic information is also available through Census Reporter.

== History ==
From the 86th-87th GAs, the district was the 20th floterial district, in Bedford, Lincoln, Marshall, and Moore counties. The 88th Tennessee General Assembly was the first in which all districts were numbered. At that time, the 63rd district was part of Lincoln and Marshall counties. From the 89th-91st GAs, it was part of Giles, Lincoln and Marshall counties. From the 92nd-93rd GAs, it was composed of Lincoln, Marshall, Moore, and Williamson counties. From the 94th-97th GAs, it has been composed of Decatur, Perry, Wayne, and Henderson counties.From the 98th-102nd GAs, it was composed of parts of Williamson and Cheatham counties. Since the 103rd General Assembly, it has been part of Williamson County.

== List of Representatives ==
Representative	Party	Years of Service	General Assembly	Hometown
Jake McCalmon	Republican	2023-present	113th-114th	Franklin
Glen Casada	Republican	2001-2022	102nd-112th	Franklin
L. Mike Williams	Democratic	1993-2000	98th-101st	Franklin
Steve McDaniel	Republican	1989-1996	96th-97th	Lexington
Cotton Ivy	Democratic	1979-1988	94th-95th	Decaturville
Martin Sir	Democratic	1971-1978	92nd-93rd	Lewisburg
W. R. Lowe Jr.	Democratic	1971-1978	91st	Lewisburg
Walter W. Bussart	Democratic	1971-1978	90th	Lewisburg
W. R. Lowe Jr.	Democratic	1971-1978	88th-89th	Lewisburg
