= Death of Nida Patcharaveerapong =

Death of Thai actress Nida Patcharaveerapong in 2022

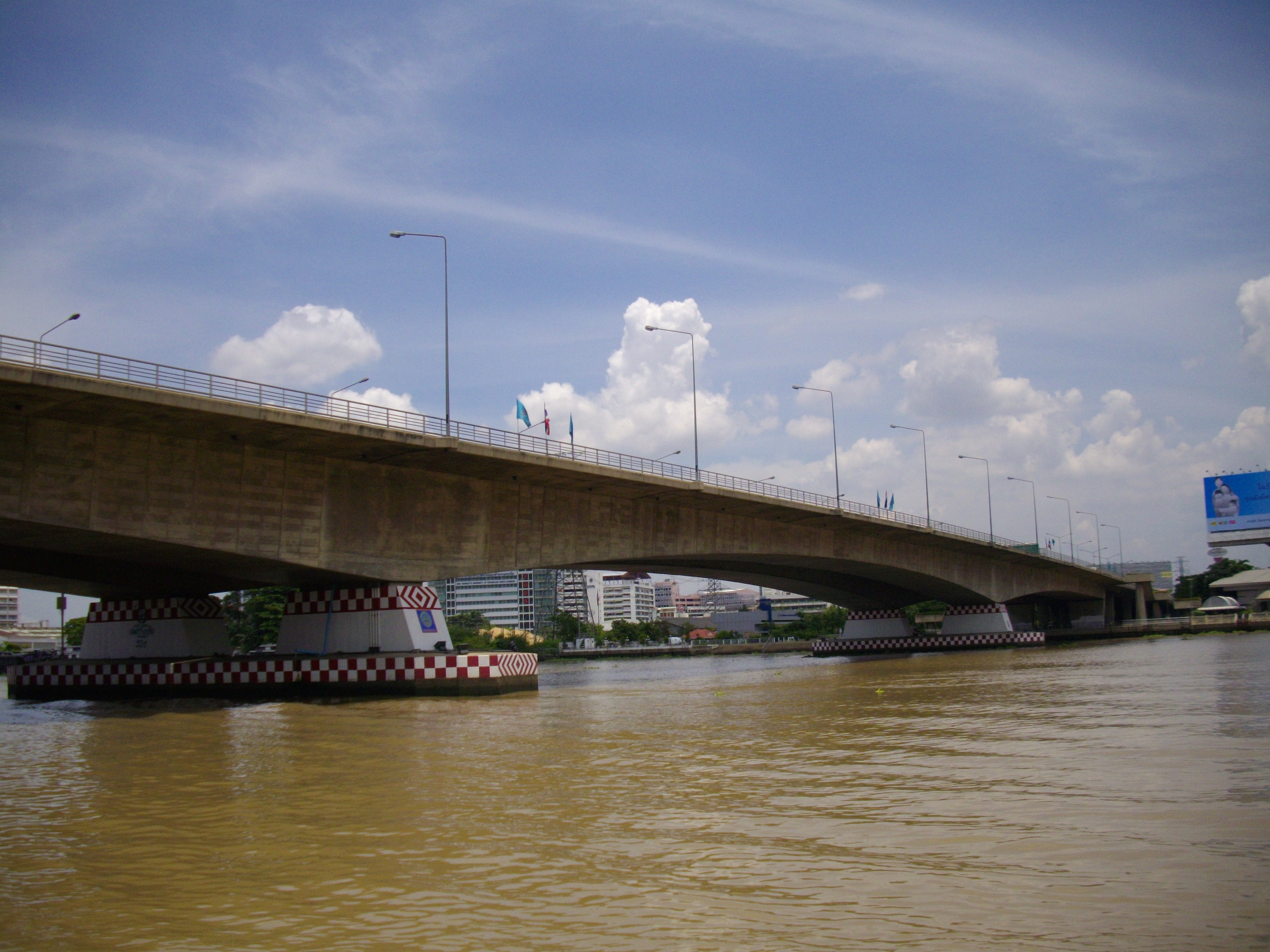
- Chao Phraya River and Rama VII Bridge, near where Nida fell from the boat
- Date: February 24–26, 2022; Approximately 22:30 ICT
- Location: Chao Phraya River, Mueang Nonthaburi District, Nonthaburi Province, Thailand

On 24 February 2022 at approximately 23:00 ICT, officials from the Ruamkatanyu Foundation received a report of a person falling from a speedboat into the Chao Phraya River within Mueang Nonthaburi District, Nonthaburi Province. Upon arrival, it was discovered that Nida Patcharaveerapong (Tangmo), one of the passengers on the boat, was the victim. Authorities subsequently searched for Nida until 13:10 on 26 February 2022, when Nida was found dead.

== Events ==
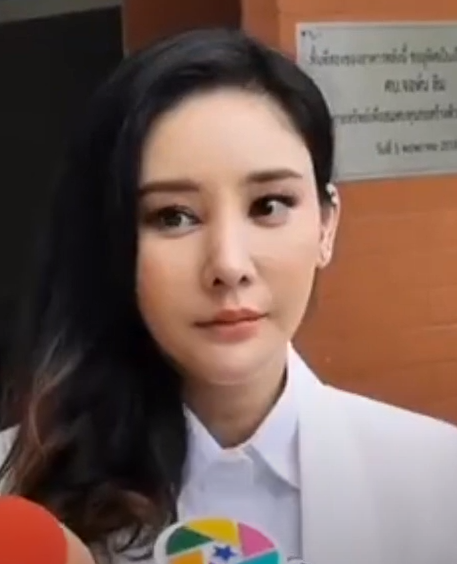
Nida Patcharaveerapong, the victim

On 24 February 2022 at 16:50, Nida left her residence to join a dinner with five friends: Mr. Tanupat Lerttaweesuk, owner of the boat (Por); Ms. Idsarin Juthasuksawat, personal manager (Gatick); Ms. Wisapat Manomairat (Sand); Mr. Nitas Kiratisuttisathorn (Job); and Mr. Paiboon Trikanjananan, boat driver (Robert), along the banks of the Chao Phraya River. They boarded a speedboat for a leisure cruise to take photos from 20:00 until approximately 22:32. While cruising and taking photos near the Rama VII Bridge, Nida fell from the boat into the Chao Phraya River and went missing. Following the incident, the group on the boat circled the area to search for about 30 minutes before diving team volunteers from Ruamkatanyu, including Saranyu Prachagrit, Nakhorn Silachai, and Saitarn Niyomkan, arrived to begin search operations at 00:20 on 25 February 2022. Later at around 01:00, Nida's brother arrived at the accident site and attempted to contact Idsarin without success. Meanwhile, Nida's mother told Sanook.com that Idsarin did not inform her of the progress or contact her at all, and her whereabouts were unknown. An unidentified individual also attempted to take Nida's mother away from the area, during which she stated, "Mother thinks this cannot be covered up." Authorities temporarily suspended the search mission at 06:30 as river currents intensified and boat traffic increased, in order to replan the search. Ekkaphan Bunleurit volunteered to search up to 10 kilometers around the site, alongside rescue volunteers from the Por Teck Tung Foundation as reinforcements.

Later at 08:00, the Ruamkatanyu diving team and patrol boats from the Royal Thai Navy resumed the search before suspending it again at 16:00 due to rising sea tides and strong waves. After suspension, some officials concluded that given the elapsed time, Nida was likely deceased, shifting the mission from underwater diving to surface and drone searches starting at 17:00, but without success. At approximately 13:10 on 26 February, authorities were notified by nearby residents that a human-like object was floating near Pibul Songkhram Pier 1. Coincidentally, Nida's brother was driving a boat nearby and confirmed it was a female body, coordinating with officials to bring the body to Pibul Songkhram Pier 1. Relatives—her mother and brother—made a preliminary identification, confirming it was Nida. Officials recorded the time of death and transferred the body for an autopsy at the Institute of Forensic Medicine, Police Hospital. Details revealed that the location where Nida's body surfaced was where Mongkolkit Suksintharanon and his girlfriend had conducted a morning merit-making ritual, near where residents had left items, about 50 meters from the reported fall site and 300 meters from Pibul Songkhram Pier 1.

== Autopsy ==
Following the initial autopsy, a deep slash wound exposing the bone was found on her left thigh, suspected to be caused by the speedboat's propeller. The depth of the wound likely rendered her left leg unusable, explaining why Nida, a skilled swimmer, could not survive. Large amounts of sand were found on her face and packed inside her lungs, suggesting the body sank to the bottom of the Chao Phraya River before floating up. Because Nida was wearing a bodysuit, statements claiming she went down to urinate before falling were immediately invalidated, as the outfit is difficult to remove and must be pulled down from top to bottom. Relatives later expressed a desire to donate Nida's body for human anatomy studies (as a cadaver) and donate functional organs, but medical teams stated the body was unsuitable due to prolonged water retention. Relatives instead arranged religious rites at Liberty Church Bangkok from 11 to 13 March 2022, with cremation scheduled at Bangkok Methodist Church on 14 March 2022, though the ceremony was postponed indefinitely.

Later, Police Lieutenant General Jirapat Phuritichat, Commissioner of Provincial Police Region 1, revealed autopsy results showing Nida died from asphyxiation resulting from inhaling large amounts of water while still alive. Water and mud were found in her lungs, trachea, windpipe, and stomach. Her urinary bladder was damaged and the sphincter wide open due to early decomposition from prolonged water immersion, containing non-urine liquid which prevented urinalysis.

== Legal cases ==
At 06:00 on 25 February, Nida's mother filed a missing person report at Mueang Nonthaburi Police Station. Police summoned the five individuals present on the boat—Tanupat Lerttaweesuk, Idsarin Juthasuksawat, Wisapat Manomairat, Nitas Kiratisuttisathorn, and Paiboon Trikanjananan—for questioning, but all evaded and failed to appear, claiming they needed to consult lawyers first.

Later, the Nonthaburi Provincial Court approved arrest warrants for Tanupat and Paiboon, two of the five present, on charges of operating an unauthorized boat or with an expired license, operating outside designated zones, negligence, and causing the death of another. Psychologists evaluated the mental state and decision-making of the five individuals. Forensic doctors examined the body to determine the cause of death and match wound marks with potential objects, such as removing the boat propeller to compare with Nida's leg wounds. Police also indicted Mr. Phim Thamtheerasri for assisting suspects and giving false statements, and Mr. Sittra Biabangkerd for insulting officers and defamation by publication, bringing the total number of defendants to 7.

In June 2022, Ruangsak Suvaree, Director-General of the Rights and Liberties Protection Department, disclosed a compensation payment of 110,000 baht to Nida's mother, sparking criticism of preferential treatment for celebrities. In July of the same year, Ms. Panida disclosed selling Nida's clothes for 43,000 baht.

Later, Ms. Panida Siriyutthayothin accepted settlement terms and did not join as a co-plaintiff in the lawsuit regarding Tangmo's death, receiving a total of 2 million baht: 400,000 baht in cash, two cashier's cheques of 800,000 baht each, and pearl earrings valued at approximately 50,000 baht, given specially by Sand. Defendants deposited 2 million baht at the court, plus a monthly care contract of 30,000 baht for 20 years or until death, totaling 9,250,000 baht.

In March 2023, Ms. Panida requested an additional 40.8 million baht, stating she was entitled to 50 million baht.

In June 2026, significant developments occurred over four years later as the Department of Special Investigation (DSI) accelerated evidence gathering to conclude the case file by 30 June 2026, determining whether to accept it as a special case.

=== Discovery of new wound image evidence ===
Thigh wound: A new simulated color image of the wound was revealed, showing deep cuts extending to the fat layer on Tangmo Nida's body, utilizing modern forensic technology and not previously considered in court.

Assault suspicions: The wound characteristics suggested sharp-force trauma occurring prior to death.

=== DSI mobilizes medical experts ===
Expert gathering: DSI invited four forensic and plastic surgery experts to analyze the new wound evidence with the investigative team.

Dr. Pornthip's statement: Dr. Khunying Pornthip Rojanasunan, former director of the Central Institute of Forensic Science, stated that multiple wound locations on Tangmo's body were too numerous and inconsistent with boat propellers, contradicting the initial fall-from-stern assumption and likely caused by other sharp objects.

=== Family and expert movements ===
Evidence submission: Ms. Panida Siriyutthayothin (Tangmo's mother), along with Dr. Thawatachai Kanchanarin (former Phra Mongkutklao Hospital surgeon) and Mr. Ekarat Namphokin, met DSI to follow up and submit simulated wound images and evidence.

Following previous proceedings, in late August to early September 2026, Ms. Panida Siriyutthayothin, Mr. Ekarat Namphokin, Dr. Thawatachai Kanchanarin, and Mr. Panthep Puapongpan discovered new evidence potentially involving false documentation, along with new witnesses and evidence unexamined by DSI. Actress Usamanee Vaithayanon also became involved in the case, raising concerns about potential physical danger. On 12 September 2026, Kwan Usamanee reported being threatened by an unknown man claiming ties to a former minister and police bigwig, believed linked to the Tangmo case. The evidence submitted by Kwan Usamanee to DSI consisted of photos previously submitted by Gatick as false evidence, alongside new photos of Kwan herself taken on the night Tangmo died, drawing increased public scrutiny.

== Reactions ==
Nida's death was met with widespread skepticism and doubt from the public and social media users, particularly regarding conflicting testimonies, event details, locations, and evasiveness during questioning, leading the Nonthaburi Provincial Court to issue arrest warrants for 2 of the 5 individuals on the boat. Inconsistencies between relatives and boat passengers—including Idsarin Juthasuksawat, personal manager and mother of Nida's adopted child—along with attempts to conceal and destroy evidence by hiding the boat, led fans and observers to believe the incident was murder rather than a typical accident driven by financial motives. Panida Siriyutthayothin appeared on Hone Krasae, hosted by Num Kanchai, discussing compensation calculated at 30 million baht based on multiplying an estimated 800,000 to 1 million baht per TV drama or movie fee by 30 years of Nida's life. After the show, Panida evaded media interviews, later clarifying that the 30 million figure was merely comparative.

== Aftermath ==
In March 2022, Ms. Panida expressed intent to claim an accident insurance policy gifted by her daughter to a close friend's child. Panida expressed dissatisfaction with Ms. Chanthachana Yimsai regarding the matter and subsequently criticized Mr. Warinthorn Watsang (Anna) on Hone Krasae regarding funeral arrangements, causing four funeral hosts to withdraw.

This sparked public criticism as it contradicted her daughter's wishes. Panida accused Idsarin Juthasuksawat of fraud, marking the start of heavy criticism against Panida regarding funeral exclusions for close friends.

Tensions peaked when Panida dismissed her legal team, with one lawyer stating he could not accept Panida handing her daughter's phone to Mr. Zulqarnain Raja Haider (Bung Jack), a Pakistani national banned from Thailand, for data recovery, risking personal data leaks. Furthermore, Panida previously appointed an individual with an active arrest warrant as a lawyer in the case.

On 18 July 2022, the suspects hosted a birthday party for Ms. Panida, where she accepted gifts and referred to them as sons, drawing further criticism for embracing the boat owner and driver while alienating her daughter's close friends. Panida later stated she 100% forgave Por and Robert, but distrusted Warinthorn Watsang (Anna) and Chanthachana Yimsai (Hippo).

In 2023, public reaction resurfaced when Panida stated she wanted a total of 50 million baht, having previously received 9,403,000 baht (spanning September 2022–2085) including clothing sales (43,000 baht), rights department compensation (110,000 baht), settlement funds (9,200,000 baht), pearl earrings (50,000 baht), and a promised car.

Panida also cited new evidence—a dashcam video from the incident day—raising confusion as police had previously seized all items and vehicles. Meanwhile, Wisapat Manomairat filed a 40.8 million baht lawsuit against Panida, bringing total disputed claims in Nida's death to over 100,050,000 baht including yearly bonuses, marking the highest compensation claims in Thai legal history.

On 28 October 2024, Wisapat Manomairat revealed she was planned by lawyer Sittra Biabangkerd to act as a legal victim.
