= Vitamin and mineral management for dialysis =

Vitamin and mineral management for dialysis patients is a required treatment for people undergoing dialysis because during end-stage kidney disease and dialysis the kidneys are functioning at less than 15% of normal levels. As a consequence, certain vitamin and mineral restrictions and supplementations are needed.

== The kidney’s role in vitamin and mineral metabolism ==
People on dialysis must follow dietary restrictions, making it difficult for them to get the necessary amounts of certain vitamins and minerals to stay healthy. In addition, vitamins and minerals are lost during the process of dialysis. Therefore, dialysis patients are at risk for vitamin and mineral deficiencies. Since vitamins are necessary for proper metabolism, protein building, and growth it is important for the health of dialysis patients that they are supplemented with any vitamins or minerals that they may be deficient in.

== Nutrients to avoid in dialysis ==
There are some nutrients that are restricted in kidney failure patients because of the body's inability to excrete excessive amounts of them due to the kidneys not functioning properly. In general, these nutrients include:

- Potassium: The kidneys help to regulate potassium levels. When the kidneys are damaged, potassium levels can become elevated. Elevated potassium levels can cause the heart to beat irregularly or even stop.
- Phosphorus: The kidneys also help to regulate phosphorus levels in the body. When the kidneys are damaged, they aren't able to remove excessive phosphorus, causing it to build up in blood. Doctors may prescribe a phosphate binder that is taken with meals to help remove excess phosphorus
- Sodium: In patients with kidney failure, sodium can cause excessive fluid retention, which can lead to elevated blood pressure, edema, heart failure, and shortness of breath.
- Fluid: As kidney damage worsens so does the ability to excrete fluid. In kidney failure patients, excessive fluid intake can result in the same conditions that excessive sodium intake does.

== Vitamins and minerals to supplement in dialysis ==
Many foods that contain phosphorus and potassium (restricted in dialysis patients) also contain folate, niacin, riboflavin, and vitamin B6 (water-soluble vitamins). Therefore, restricting foods that contain phosphorus and potassium can lead to deficiencies in other important vitamins. In general, the following vitamins and minerals are supplemented in dialysis patients:

- B vitamins- Water-soluble vitamins that play a role in red blood cell development to prevent anemia and contribute to metabolism to help change the foods you eat into energy.
- Vitamin C- Water-soluble vitamin that aids in keeping tissues healthy, wound healing, and infection prevention.
- Vitamin D- Normally, the kidney changes vitamin D into its active form, vitamin D3, which helps with calcium absorption. Many dialysis patients have low intakes of calcium due to avoidance of foods containing phosphorus and potassium. Lack of calcium can lead to renal osteodystrophy (bone weakening). On the other hand, too much calcium can cause calcification or calciphylaxis (calcium deposits in places such as the heart. Vitamin D is a fat-soluble vitamin, meaning that excessive amounts can be damaging so it should be prescribed and monitored by a doctor.
- Iron- Kidney damage results in inability of the kidney to produce erythropoietin, which stimulates red blood cell production.

== See also ==
- Kidney disease
- Kidney dialysis
