= Gerald McCormick =

American politician (1962–2025)

Majority Leader of the Tennessee House of Representatives
- In office 2011–2014
- Succeeded by: Glen Casada

Member of the Tennessee House of Representatives from the 26th district
- In office 2005 – January 8, 2019
- Preceded by: Bobby Wood
- Succeeded by: Robin Smith

Personal details
- Born: Gerald Dennis McCormick II; February 22, 1962 Memphis, Tennessee, U.S.
- Died: December 11, 2025 (aged 63) Nashville, Tennessee, U.S.
- Party: Republican
- Spouse: Kim McCormick
- Children: 2

Gerald Dennis McCormick II (February 22, 1962 – December 11, 2025) was an American Republican politician in Tennessee, representing the 26th District as State Representative. His district included parts of Hamilton County, Tennessee.

== Life and career ==
Gerald McCormick was born on February 22, 1962. He was a graduate of the University of Tennessee. He served in the Gulf War. He worked as a real estate broker.

He served on the Board of Directors of Blood Assurance. He was a member of the Kappa Alpha Order, National Rifle Association of America, the Veterans of Foreign Wars, the American Legion, and the Harrison Ruritan. He was a board member of the Chattanooga Jaycees, and president of the Pachyderm Club.

McCormick was a Methodist, and was married with two children. He died from complications of amyotrophic lateral sclerosis in Nashville on December 11, 2025, at the age of 63.
