= David Hepworth =

British music journalist

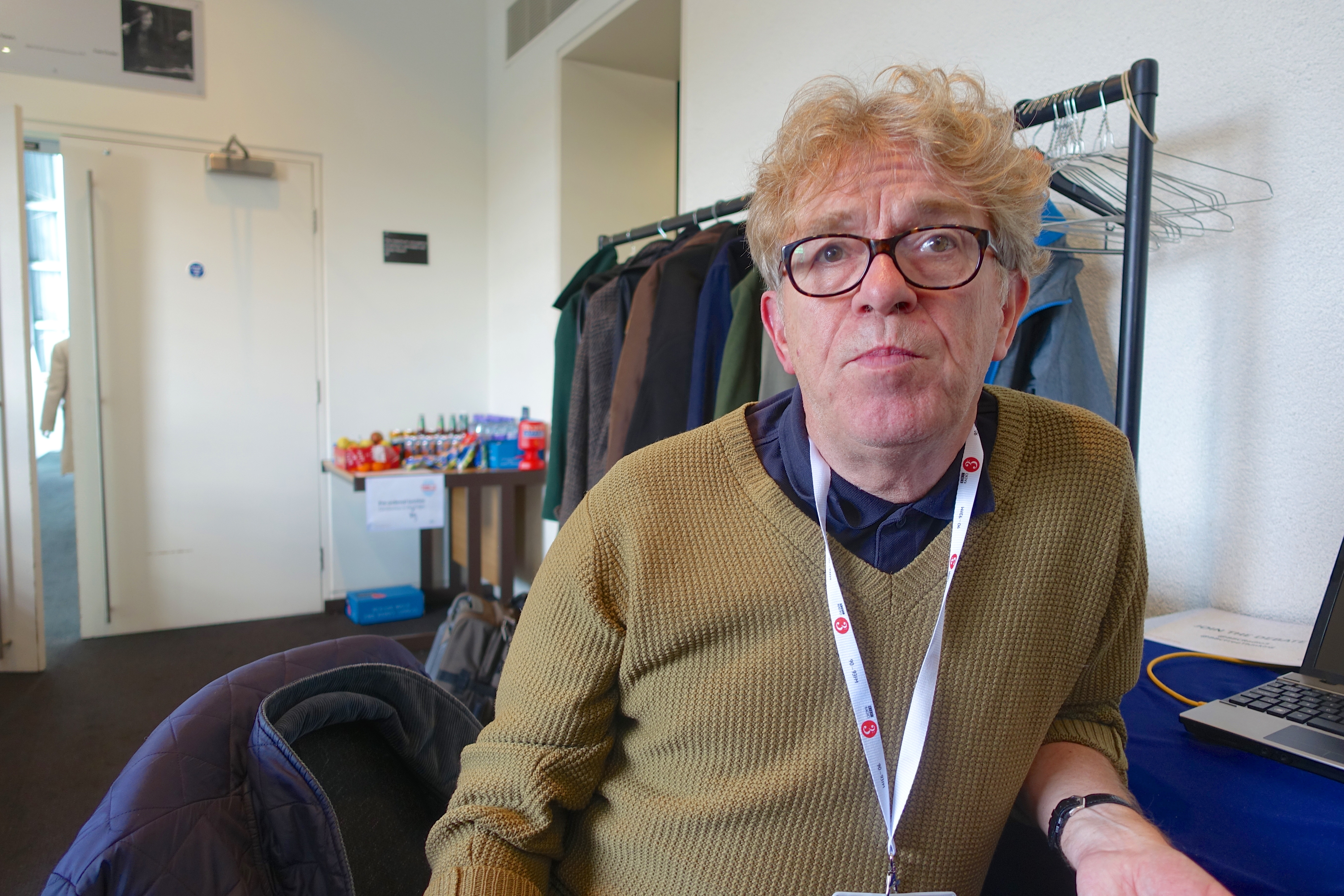
- Hepworth in 2014.
- Born: July 27, 1950 (age 76); Dewsbury, West Yorkshire, United Kingdom
- Education: Middlesex Polytechnic
- Occupations: Music journalist; essayist; television presenter
- Writing career
- Period: 1979–present
- Website: davidhepworth.com

David Hepworth (born 27 July 1950) is a British music journalist, writer, television presenter, and publishing industry analyst. He was instrumental in the foundation of a number of popular magazines in the 1980s, 1990s and 2000s. Along with the journalist, editor and broadcaster Mark Ellen, he turned the pop magazine Smash Hits into one of the most popular UK music magazines of the 1980s. A presenter of The Old Grey Whistle Test in the 1980s, he co-presented the BBC broadcast of Live Aid in 1985.

== Early life ==
David Hepworth was born in Dewsbury, then in the West Riding of Yorkshire, and attended the Queen Elizabeth Grammar School, Wakefield, and Trent Park College of Education. He studied Drama and Education at Middlesex Polytechnic (now Middlesex University), graduating in 1972. He worked for HMV and Beserkley Records, before becoming a freelance journalist.

== Career ==
Hepworth's career in journalism began with contributions to NME and Sounds. He joined the newly launched magazine Smash Hits in 1979, and two years later, after turning it around financially, became its editor. In 1983 he launched Just Seventeen, a perennially popular magazine for teenage girls, and in 1984 Looks. Since then he has launched several other magazines, including Q (1986), More (1987), Empire (1988), Mojo (1993), Heat (1999) and The Word (2003). He is currently director of the publishing company Development Hell.

In the 1980s Hepworth worked for BBC Television, co-presenting the music series The Old Grey Whistle Test and coverage of the Live Aid concert from Wembley Stadium. He was the presenter Bob Geldof swore at during the Live Aid broadcast. On both of these he worked with long-term friend Mark Ellen.

Hepworth has written for The Guardian and for the UK trade magazine InPublishing.

In the 1990s he was a regular presenter on BBC GLR 94.9 – the BBC's Rock station for London.

In 2006, Hepworth sold his independent publishing company Development Hell to the EMAP group (today known as Ascential).

His subsequent primary professional activities are publishing books on music nostalgia and collaborations with Mark Ellen on Word In Your Ear, a series of podcasts and music-themed live events.

In 2021, Hepworth's book 1971 – Never a Dull Moment: Rock's Golden Year was adapted by Oscar and Bafta-winning director Asif Kapadia into the Apple TV+ documentary mini-series 1971: The Year That Music Changed Everything.

In December 2023 Hepworth was a member of the team for Middlesex University which participated in BBC's Christmas University Challenge. The team beat Corpus Christi College, Oxford, by 175 points to 80, in the final.

== Publications ==
- Hope I Get Old Before I Die: How rock’s greatest generation kept going to the end. London: Bantam, 2024. ISBN 978-1787632783
- Abbey Road: The Inside Story of the World’s Most Famous Recording Studio. London: Bantam, 2022. ISBN 978-1787636101
- Overpaid, Oversexed and Over There: How a Few Skinny Brits with Bad Teeth Rocked America. London: Bantam, 2020. ISBN 978-1787632769
- Rock & Roll A Level: The only quiz book you need. London: Bantam, 2020. ISBN 978-1-7876-3439-8
- A Fabulous Creation: How the LP Saved Our Lives. London: Bantam, 2019. ISBN 978-1-7841-6208-5
- Nothing is Real: The Beatles Were Underrated And Other Sweeping Statements About Pop. London: Bantam, 2018. ISBN 978-1-7841-6407-2
- Uncommon People: The Rise and Fall of the Rock Stars. London: Bantam, 2017. ISBN 978-0-5930-7762-7
- 1971 – Never a Dull Moment: Rock's Golden Year. London: Bantam, 2016. ISBN 0-5930-7487-4
- The Secret History of Entertainment. London: Fourth Estate, 2010. ISBN 0-0071-9011-5
