= Willis Johnson =

American billionaire and businessman (born 1947)

- Born: Willis J. Johnson; 1947 (age 78–79); Clinton, Oklahoma, U.S.
- Known for: Founder of Copart Inc.
- Political party: Republican
- Spouse: Joyce Johnson
- Children: 3
- Relatives: Jay Adair (son-in-law); Jake McCalmon (grandson)
- Military service
- Allegiance: United States
- Branch: United States Army
- Conflicts: Vietnam War
- Awards: Purple Heart

Willis J. Johnson (born 1947) is an American billionaire businessman. He is the founder and former chief executive of Copart, a vehicle salvage and auction company, founded in 1982.

== Biography ==
Born in 1947 in Clinton, Oklahoma, Johnson grew up on a dairy farm in the vicinity of Siloam Springs, Arkansas. He received his early education from a high school in California. Johnson then joined the Army and served a year-long tour in Vietnam which earned him a Purple Heart. In 1972, he bought his own junkyard in Sacramento, California, and moved his family into a trailer to fund his purchase. He took Copart public in 1994. He launched an online bidding platform for wrecked cars in 1998 (or 2002).

Willis Johnson retired from his position of CEO of Copart in 2010 and moved to Nashville, Tennessee.

In 2015, he co-founded now defunct on-demand household chore app, Takl. July 2021.

== Political contributions ==
Johnson is politically conservative and supports the Republican Party. Since 2001, he has contributed at least $1.5 million to different conservative causes.

In 2019, he contributed $50,000 to the Trump Victory Committee, a political action committee. Together with his spouse, Johnson contributed a total of $700,000 to Donald Trump's 2020 presidential campaign.

In 2021, he donated $1 million to South Dakota Governor Kristi Noem to fund a National Guard deployment to the Texas/Mexico border.

== Assets ==
In 2010, he bought an 18,600 square foot mansion in Nashville for $28 million from American country singer Alan Jackson.

Johnson also owns a 79-acre vineyard in Suisun Valley, California.

== Publications ==
- Johnson, Willis (2015). Junk to Gold: From Salvage to the World's Largest Online Auto Auction. Westbow Press. ISBN 978-1490816579.

== Personal life ==
Johnson is married to Joyce, whom he married after returning from the Vietnam War. Johnson is a practising Christian.

Johnson resides in Franklin, Tenn., and owns a large collection of classic cars, including a 1955 Chevrolet.

His son-in-law, Jay Adair, is the chief executive officer (CEO) of Copart, and owns shares in the company worth more than $800 million.

His grandson is TN General Assembly member, State Representative Jake McCalmon, a Republican in Williamson County.
