= William Lamberth =

American politician (born 1977)

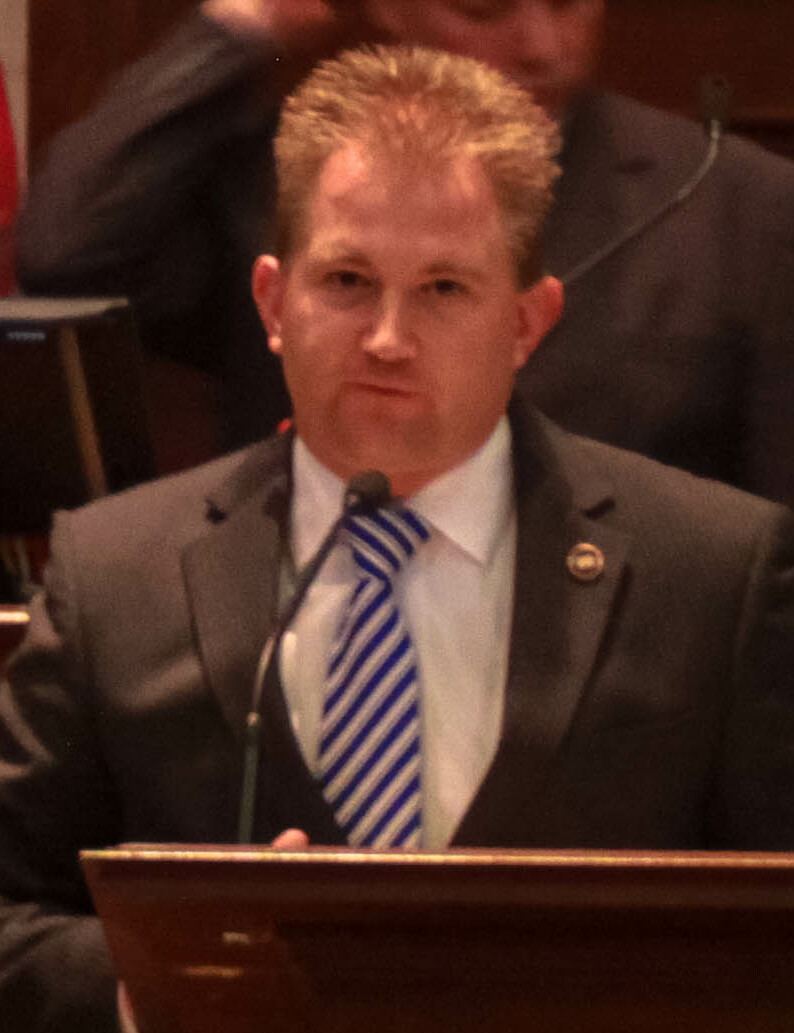
- Lamberth in 2014

Majority Leader of the Tennessee House of Representatives
- Incumbent
- Assumed office January 8, 2019
- Preceded by: Glen Casada

Member of the Tennessee House of Representatives from the 44th district
- Incumbent
- Assumed office November 6, 2012
- Preceded by: Mike McDonald

Personal details
- Born: William Gary Lamberth; December 5, 1977 (age 48) Bowling Green, Kentucky, U.S.
- Party: Republican
- Spouse: Lauren Lamberth
- Children: 2
- Education: University of Tennessee (BA); College of William and Mary (JD)

William Gary Lamberth (born December 5, 1977) is an American politician. He serves as a Republican member of the Tennessee House of Representatives for the 44th district, encompassing parts of Sumner County, Tennessee. He has served as the House Majority Leader since 2019.

== Biography ==
=== Early life ===
He was born on December 5, 1977, in Bowling Green, Kentucky. He is a fifth generation resident of Sumner County, Tennessee, and grew up on a farm in Tennessee. He attended Portland High School. He graduated from the University of Tennessee in Knoxville, Tennessee, in 2001 and received a J.D. from the William & Mary School of Law in Williamsburg, Virginia, in 2004, where he was elected President of the Student Bar Association.

=== Career ===
He was an Assistant District Attorney for Sumner County. He now practices law as a private attorney in Gallatin, Tennessee.

He was elected as state representative for the 44th district Tennessee in 2012, replacing Democratic representative Mike McDonald.

He is former president of the Rotary Club of Gallatin, Tennessee, and the Sumner County Bar Association, and former treasurer of the Republican Party of Sumner County. He is also Chairman of the Portland Community Education Foundation, table host and donor to the Cumberland Crisis Pregnancy Center in Gallatin. He also donates to the Middle Tennessee Mission Outreach and regularly goes on Christian missions to Honduras and other regions of the world that are in need of humanitarian relief efforts.

In 2023, Lamberth supported a resolution to expel three Democratic lawmakers from the legislature for violating decorum rules. The expulsion was widely characterized as unprecedented.

== Political positions ==
=== Marijuana ===
Lamberth embarked on an effort to ban all forms of cannabis in Tennessee containing greater than 0.3% THC.

=== LGBTQ rights ===
Lamberth has been criticized by the LGBT community for supporting bills to criminalize doctors performing gender reassignment surgery, requiring transgender people to use public restrooms corresponding to their biological sex, and requiring transgender athletes in high school to compete in collegiate sports that correspond to their biological sex.

=== Education ===
In 2025, Lamberth sponsored legislation that aims to challenge the 1982 U.S. Supreme Court case, Plyler v. Doe, which established the right to an education for all students, regardless of immigration status. Lamberth cited the cost of educating undocumented students in his proposal. The bill would authorize school districts to refuse to enroll students who are illegally present or unable to prove legal residence in the United States, or charge them tuition. Lamberth has stated that he believes Plyler v. Doe was wrongly decided and that the current Supreme Court would be likely to reverse the ruling.

== Personal life ==
He is married and has two children. He is a Baptist. He lives in Cottontown, Tennessee, with his family.

Tennessee House of Representatives
Preceded by Glen Casada	Majority Leader of the Tennessee House of Representatives; 2019–present	Incumbent
