= The Word (UK magazine) =

Music magazine

- Word Magazine February 2009
- Editor: Mark Ellen
- Categories: Music/Entertainment
- Frequency: Monthly
- Publisher: Development Hell Limited
- First issue: 2003
- Final issue: 2012
- Country: United Kingdom
- Based in: London
- Website: web.archive.org/web/20030116094917/http://www.wordmagazine.co.uk:80/

The Word was a monthly music magazine published in London. It was voted UK 'Music Magazine of the Year' in 2007 and 2008. It ran for 114 issues, the last bearing the cover date August 2012.

== History ==
The Word was launched in February 2003. It was the first magazine to come from Development Hell Ltd, an independent publishing venture set up by David Hepworth and Jerry Perkins, two former EMAP executives with more than 35 years combined experience devising, editing and publishing titles such as Q, Empire, Mojo and Heat. The company also produce the dance music and clubbing title Mixmag and owns the dance music networking site Don't Stay In. The Guardian Media Group owned 29.5% of the Development Hell Ltd. The Word was edited by Mark Ellen, former editor of Smash Hits, Q and Select, launch managing editor of Mojo, and former editor-in-chief of EMAP Metro.

On 29 June 2012, David Hepworth announced the closure of the magazine via his Twitter feed and on the magazine's website.

== Content ==
The magazine was divided into two sections; the front, which featured photographs, interviews and features, and the rear, which concentrated on reviews of CDs, DVDs, books and films.

Regular features included 'Diary' (Mark Ellen discussing recent events) 'Face Time' (an interview feature), 'Word of Mouth' (People we like & the things they like) 'Departure Lounge' (obituaries), 'Word to the Wise' (an interview) 'InBox' (letters to the editor), and 'The Last Word', the reviews section. Latterly, this included 'The Massive Attacks', a section devoted to reader reviews taken from the magazine's website.

Artists interviewed by The Word included Paul McCartney, Prince, Nick Cave, Samuel L. Jackson, U2, Martin Scorsese, Thom Yorke, Morrissey, Björk, Michael Palin, Brian Eno, Peter Ackroyd, David Sedaris, Ricky Gervais, Russell Brand, Wim Wenders, Brian De Palma, Oasis, David Bowie, Joni Mitchell, Amy Winehouse, Leonard Cohen, Tom Waits, Leonardo DiCaprio, Kate Winslet, Sam Mendes, Salman Rushdie, Malcolm Gladwell, David Simon, Van Morrison, Robert Smith and Lou Reed.

== Podcast ==
The Word's weekly podcast was an informal, unscripted broadcast of irregular length, and featured regular contributors Mark Ellen, David Hepworth, Andrew Harrison, Fraser Lewry and Kate Mossman. Guests included Nick Lowe, Andrew Collins, Barry McIlheney, Clare Grogan, Supergrass, Danny Baker, CW Stoneking, Neil Hannon, Robin Ince, Devon Sproule & Paul Curreri, Dom Joly, Wilko Johnson, Van Dyke Parks, Bob Harris, Pugwash, Robert Forster, Jac Holzman, Darrell Scott and Chris Difford. It ran for 217 episodes between October 2006 and June 2012.

In 2008 the magazine launched a second, occasional Podcast entitled 'Backstage'. It featured interviews with figures of interest including Richard Thompson, David Simon, Malcolm Gladwell, Neal Stephenson, Clive James and Pete Atkin, Don Felder, and Al Kooper.

In 2014 the podcast returned to iTunes with a series of interviews in front of a live audience at "The Islington" venue in North London. Guests included Simon Napier Bell, Ben Watt and Danny Baker.

Ellen and Hepworth have continued podcasting as 'Word In Your Ear'. They create several new episodes a week, and the feed includes material dating back to 2007.

== Website ==
The Word's website was a promotional tool for the magazine and a forum for its readers, although editorial staff occasionally posted and readers' reviews were reproduced in the magazine itself.

Following the closure of the Word Magazine website on 17 July 2012, the reader community created its own site, named The Afterword. with the aim of providing continuity of conversation and cultural discussion (and lists). The byline of the new site is: "Musings on The Byways Of Popular Culture".

== List of cover stars ==
- March 2003: Nick Cave
- April 2003: Elvis Costello
- May 2003: Blur
- June 2003: Morrissey
- July 2003: Björk
- August 2003: Paul Weller
- September 2003: Dido
- October 2003: Travis
- November 2003: David Bowie
- December 2003: Paul McCartney
- January 2004: Muddy Waters
- February 2004: Elvis Presley
- March 2004: The Secret History of Entertainment
- April 2004: The iPod
- May 2004: Franz Ferdinand
- June 2004: How Rock Changed the Movies
- July 2004: Jeff Buckley
- August 2004: Prince
- September 2004: The White Stripes
- October 2004: Bruce Springsteen
- November 2004: Live Aid
- December 2004: John Peel
- January 2005: Morrissey
- February 2005: Tom Waits
- March 2005: Joni Mitchell
- April 2005: Eric Clapton
- May 2005: Pete Doherty
- June 2005: Bruce Springsteen
- July 2005: Ry Cooder
- August 2005: Paul Weller
- September 2005: Noel Gallagher
- October 2005: Roger Waters
- November 2005: Mick Jones
- December 2005: The Edge
- January 2006: Bob Dylan
- February 2006: Johnny Cash
- March 2006: KT Tunstall
- April 2006: Pet Shop Boys
- May 2006: Jack Johnson
- June 2006: Leonard Cohen
- July 2006: Neil Young
- August 2006: Keith Richards
- September 2006: The 1980s
- October 2006: Joe Strummer
- November 2006: The Killers
- December 2006: Tom Waits
- January 2007: The Best of 2006
- February 2007: Jim Morrison
- March 2007: Amy Winehouse
- April 2007: Joni Mitchell
- May 2007: Rufus Wainwright
- June 2007: Nick Cave
- July 2007: Leonard Cohen
- August 2007: Van Morrison
- September 2007: Johnny Marr
- October 2007: David Gilmour
- November 2007: Bruce Springsteen
- December 2007: Robert Plant
- January 2008: The Best of 2007
- February 2008: Morrissey
- March 2008: Nick Cave
- April 2008: Elvis Costello
- May 2008: Roger Waters
- June 2008: Thom Yorke
- July 2008: John Martyn
- August 2008: George Harrison
- September 2008: Lemmy
- October 2008: John Lennon
- November 2008: Guy Garvey
- December 2008: Jarvis Cocker
- January 2009: Leonard Cohen
- February 2009: Kate Bush
- March 2009: John Martyn
- April 2009: The Pet Shop Boys
- May 2009: 50 Years Of Island Records
- June 2009: Iggy Pop
- July 2009: Bono
- August 2009: The Beatles
- September 2009: Robert Wyatt
- October 2009: David Bowie
- November 2009: Wayne Coyne
- December 2009: The Specials
- January 2010: The Best of 2009
- February 2010: Ian Dury
- March 2010: Bob Dylan
- April 2010: David Bowie, Cherie Currie, Nick Kent
- May 2010: John Peel
- June 2010: Keith Richards, Lady Gaga
- July 2010: Bruce Springsteen, Lily Allen
- August 2010: The biggest acts in the world
- September 2010: Richard Thompson
- October 2010: Bryan Ferry
- November 2010: Frank Zappa
- December 2010: Bruce Springsteen
- January 2011: The Best of 2010
- February 2011: Tom Waits
- March 2011: Elton John
- April 2011: Joe Strummer, Bootsy Collins, Woody Guthrie
- May 2011: Elvis Presley, Priscilla Presley
- June 2011: Keith Richards, Ricky Gervais, The National, The Pierces, Hugh Laurie
- July 2011: Dave Davies
- August 2011: Brett Anderson
- September 2011: Amy Winehouse
- October 2011: George Harrison, Adele, Freddie Mercury
- November 2011: Noel Gallagher
- December 2011: Kate Bush
- January 2012: The Best of 2011
- February 2012: Leonard Cohen, P. J. Harvey
- March 2012: Lady Gaga
- April 2012: Paul Weller
- May 2012 Damon Albarn
- June 2012 The Stone Roses
- July 2012 Ray Davies
- August 2012 Robert Smith
