= Jake McCalmon =

American politician (born 1986)

Member of the Tennessee House of Representatives from the 63rd district
- Incumbent
- Assumed office January 10, 2023
- Preceded by: Glen Casada

Personal details
- Born: April 6, 1986 (age 40)
- Party: Republican
- Spouse: Rachelle McCalmon
- Children: 3
- Relatives: Willis Johnson (grandfather)
- Education: Brandman University (BS)

Jake McCalmon (born April 6, 1986) is an American politician from Tennessee. He is a Republican and has represented the 63rd district of the Tennessee House of Representatives since 2023.

McCalmon attended Brandman University where he earned a Bachelor of Science in Business Administration. His first campaign for the State House was in 2022, when he ran to succeed Glen Casada as the representative for the 63rd district. McCalmon won the Republican primary and went on to defeat Democrat Kisha Davis in the general election.

McCalmon lives in Williamson County with his wife, Rachelle, and their three daughters. He is also a practitioner of the martial arts, specifically Kajukenbo in which he has a seventh-degree black belt.

In 2023, McCalmon supported a resolution to expel three Democratic lawmakers from the legislature for violating decorum rules. The expulsion was widely characterized as unprecedented.
