= Jay Adair =

American businessman and winemaker

- Born: Aaron Jayson Adair; 1969 or 1970 (age 55–56)
- Occupation: Businessman
- Title: Executive Chairman, Chief Executive Officer Copart
- Term: April 2024 - present
- Predecessor: Willis Johnson
- Spouse: Tammi Johnson
- Children: 2
- Relatives: Willis Johnson (father-in-law)

Jay Adair (born 1969/1970) is an American billionaire businessman, the former chief executive officer (CEO) and current executive chairman of Copart, a publicly traded company specializing in vehicle salvage and online auctions. He is known for his role in advancing Copart's business model, particularly its transition to online auctions.

== Personal life ==
Adair grew up in Orangevale in California. He is married to Tammi Adair, daughter of Copart founder Willis Johnson. Together, they have two children. In 1993, the family relocated to Suisun Valley in Fairfield, California where they planted a vineyard and began producing wine. Their first wine was bottled in 2004 under the Tammi's Vineyard Cabernet Sauvignon label.

== Career ==
=== Copart ===
Adair began his career at Copart in 1989 as a manager at the age of 19. By 1990, he was promoted to Manager of Operations and Vice President of Sales and Operations. In 1992, he was appointed to the company's board of directors.

In 1998, Adair oversaw Copart's development of an online auction platform. The move allowed the company to evolve from a salvage vehicle auction business into a technology platform connecting buyers and sellers around the world.

In 2003, Adair introduced Copart's patented Virtual Bidding Second Generation (VB2) technology, transitioning its auctions from physical locations to an entirely online format and making Copart one of the first auto auction companies to adopt a fully online model. In 2013, the VB2 platform was replaced with VB3, which is currently used by over 750,000 members across more than 170 countries.

Adair succeeded Willis Johnson as CEO in February 2010. During his tenure, Copart expanded into international markets, including Brazil, Europe and the Middle East. In 2012, Adair initiated the relocation of the company's headquarters from Vallejo, California to Dallas, Texas. The company also expanded its operations in Texas with acquisitions in Wilmer and Temple, bringing its total number of car auction sites in the state to 14. By 2020, Copart's net income had grown to $726 million, a 400% increase since Adair became CEO, and the company's shares rose by approximately 1,100% over a decade. By 2021, Copart operated at 243 locations across 11 countries.

By 2019, Adair owned shares in the company worth more than $800 million. In 2020, he was ranked as the highest-paid leader among public company executives in North Texas by The Dallas Morning News. In February 2022, Adair served as Co-CEO alongside Jeff Liaw before stepping down in March 2024 to allow Liaw to become sole CEO. He was subsequently appointed Executive Chairman in April 2024.

=== Adair Family Wines ===
Adair and his wife own Adair Winery in Suisun Valley, where they have long produced Tammi's Vineyard Cabernet Sauvignon. In 2021, they expanded their operations with the acquisition of a neighboring property to turn Adair Winery into an estate winery open to the public.

In October 2024, Adair purchased five wineries from Vintage Wine Estates for $85 million during bankruptcy proceedings. Tere made through Adair Family Wines, a newly established entity, included Clos Pegase, Girard Wineries, B.R. Cohn, Kunde, and Viansa, along with 120 acres of vineyards and five tasting rooms.

Clos Pegase is known for its distinctive architecture and an art collection located nearby. B.R. Cohn, founded by Bruce Cohn, gained recognition for hosting outdoor rock concerts. Girard Winery, situated across from Clos Pegase, shares water rights with its neighbor, a factor influencing Adair's decision to acquire both properties. Kunde, established by Arthur and Fred Kunde in 1990, produces estate-grown wines on land where the Kunde family has cultivated grapes for over a century. Viansa is recognized for conducting outdoor wine tastings in open-air cabanas with views of California's wine country.

Adair retained the existing staff of 120 employees, began hiring additional personnel, and launched significant restoration efforts.

== Political contributions ==
Together with his wife, Adair contributed $200,000 to Donald Trump's 2020 presidential campaign.
