= Lyles, Tennessee =

- Census-designated place
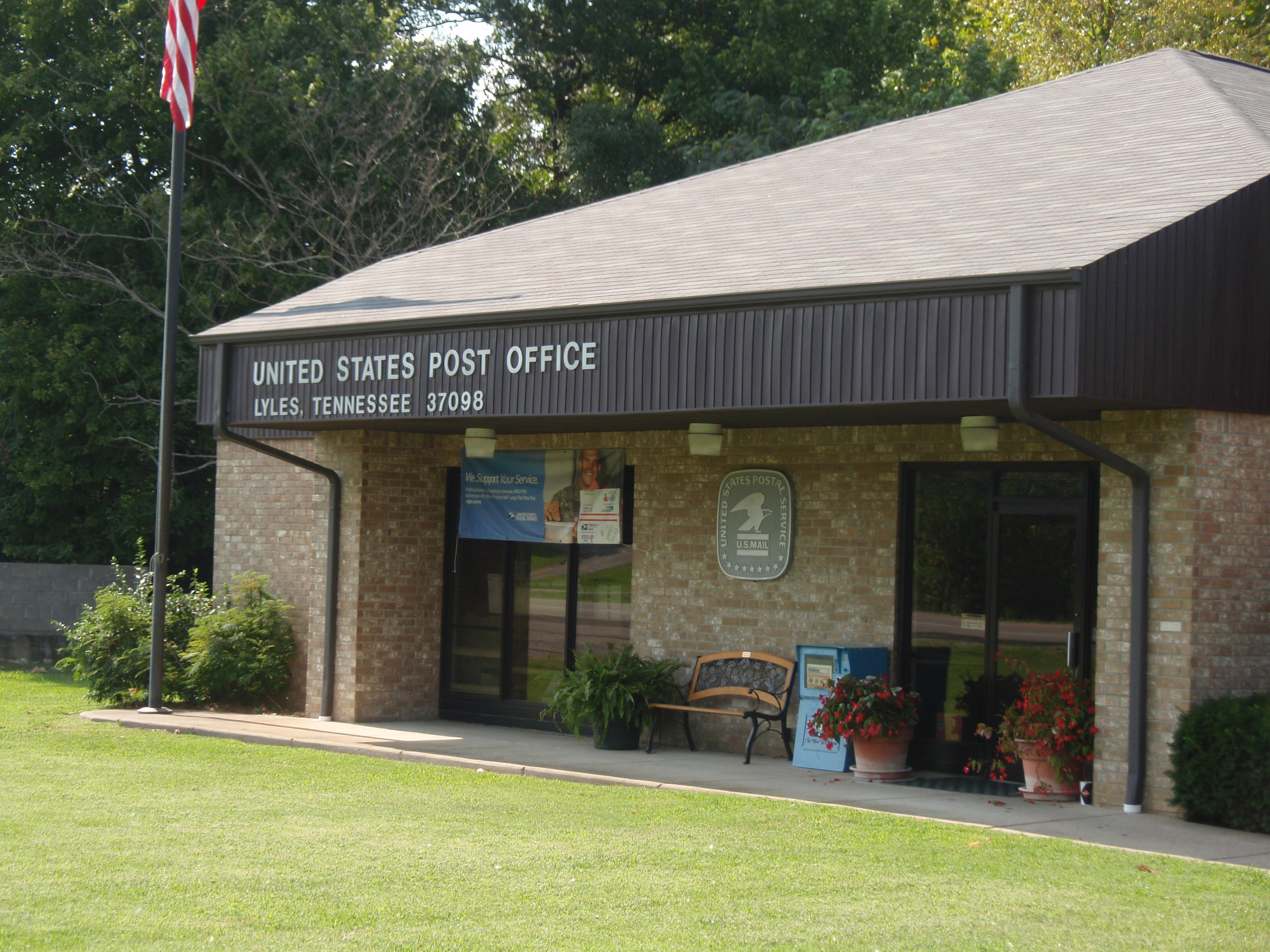
- Lyles Post Office

- Location within Tennessee Location within the United States
- Coordinates: 35°55′11″N 87°20′42″W
- Country: United States
- State: Tennessee
- County: Hickman

Area
  - Total: 2.62 sq mi (6.78 km^{2})
  - Land: 2.62 sq mi (6.78 km^{2})
  - Water: 0 sq mi (0.00 km^{2})
- Elevation: 866 ft (264 m)

Population (2020)
  - Total: 763
  - Density: 291.3/sq mi (112.47/km^{2})
- Time zone: UTC-6 (Central (CST))
  - Summer (DST): UTC-5 (CDT)
- ZIP code: 37098
- Area code: 931
- GNIS feature ID: 1292325

Lyles is a rural census-designated place and unincorporated community in Hickman County, Tennessee, United States.

== Population ==
As of the 2010 census, the population was 734.

As of the 2020 census, the population was 763.

== Location ==
Lyles is located along Tennessee State Route 100. The community has a small number of stores, churches, and is also the location of Camp Okawehna.

== History ==
Lyles was originally known as Lyell Station. William, John, and Robert Lyell had much to do with the building of Lyell Station. Their ancestors, Robert Lyell and Deborah Lawrence Lyell, came to Hickman County from Virginia before 1840. Lyles (or Lyell Station) was served by the Nashville, Chattanooga and St. Louis Railway. (See the 1903 diagram showing Lyles. ) Although there is no longer any rail service, the tracks remain in Lyles on Google Maps.

It isn't known when Lyell Station came to be known as Lyles. To this day there are those whose surname is Lyell that are living in Lyles. Ed Lyell Road was named after Ed Lyell who died in 1977. He was a descendant of the original Lyell settlers. Other road names including McGee Road, Tidwell Lane, and Bishop Road bear witness to other early families of Lyles.

Lyles is surrounded by two other small cities that make up the East Hickman area, Wrigley and Bon Aqua, the most famous of the three being Bon Aqua, as Country Music Hall of Famer and music legend Johnny Cash had lived there once.
