= Blood Assurance =

US health organization

Blood Assurance is a non-profit organization designed to provide blood to surrounding hospitals of the Chattanooga, Tennessee, North Georgia, Alabama, Southwest Virginia, and North Carolina areas.

Their headquarters is on East 4th Street in Chattanooga.

== History ==
Blood Assurance was founded in 1972 by the Chattanooga–Hamilton County Medical Society, Chattanooga Area Hospital Council, and Chattanooga Jaycees; it serves more than 70 health care facilities in 47 counties in 5 states. Blood Assurance is a member of the American Association of Blood Banks, America's Blood Banks, Blood Centers of America, the Tennessee Association of Blood Banks, the Tennessee Hospital Association, the Chattanooga Area Hospital Council, the Tennessee Department of Health, and the Georgia Department of Community Health. The organization is licensed by the Alabama State Board of Health, the Georgia Department of Human Resources, the Tennessee Department of Public Health and the U.S. Food and Drug Administration (FDA).

== Locations ==
As of May 2014, there are 13 donation centers and 13 bloodmobiles.

- Cartersville, Georgia
- Dalton, Georgia
- Fort Oglethorpe, Georgia
- Rome, Georgia
- Chattanooga, Tennessee (three locations)
- Cleveland, Tennessee
- Cookeville, Tennessee
- Hixson, Tennessee
- Johnson City, Tennessee
- Tullahoma, Tennessee
- Abingdon, Virginia
- Bristol, Virginia

== Facilities served ==
The following facilities are listed as being serviced by Blood Assurance.

=== Alabama ===
- Cherokee Medical Center, Centre
- DeKalb Regional Medical Center, Fort Payne
- Highlands Medical Center, Scottsboro

=== Georgia ===
- Union General Hospital, Blairsville
- Fannin Regional Hospital, Blue Ridge
- Gordon Hospital, Calhoun
- Cartersville Medical Center, Cartersville
- Polk Medical Center, Cedartown
- Murray Medical Center, Chatsworth
- Hamilton Medical Center, Dalton
- North Georgia Medical Center, Ellijay
- Hutcheson Medical Center, Fort Oglethorpe
- DCI - Fort Oglethorpe, Fort Oglethorpe
- Chatuge Regional Hospital, Hiawassee
- DCI – LaFayette, LaFayette
- Floyd Medical Center, Rome
- Redmond Regional Medical Center, Rome
- Wildwood Hospital, Wildwood

=== North Carolina ===
- Erlanger Western Carolina Hospital, Murphy

=== Tennessee ===
- Cumberland River Hospital, Celina
- Erlanger Health System, Chattanooga
- Erlanger North Hospital, Chattanooga
- Memorial Hospital, Chattanooga
- Parkridge East Hospital, Chattanooga
- Parkridge Medical Center, Chattanooga
- Children's Hospital at Erlanger, Chattanooga
- Chattanooga Kidney Center, Chattanooga
- Chattanooga Kidney Center – North, Chattanooga
- DCI – Lyerly, Chattanooga
- DCI - S. Broad, Chattanooga
- DCI - Third Street, Chattanooga
- HealthSouth Chattanooga Rehab, Chattanooga
- HealthSouth Surgery Center, Chattanooga
- Kindred Hospital, Chattanooga
- Physician's Surgery Center, Chattanooga
- Tennova Healthcare, Clarksville
- Sky Ridge Medical Center, Cleveland
- Sky Ridge Medical Center Westside Campus, Cleveland
- Kidney Center of Cleveland, Cleveland
- Maury Regional Medical Center, Columbia
- Cookeville Regional Medical Center, Cookeville
- Copper Basin Medical Center, Copperhill
- Rhea Medical Center, Dayton
- Unicoi County Medical Center, Erwin
- DCI - East Ridge, East Ridge
- Lincoln Medical Center, Fayetteville
- Williamson Medical Center, Franklin
- DCI – Hixson, Hixson
- Memorial North Park Hospital, Hixson
- Grandview Medical Center, Jasper
- DCI – Jasper, Jasper
- Franklin Woods Community Hospital, Johnson City
- Johnson City Medical Center, Johnson City
- Marshall Medical Center, Lewisburg
- Medical Center of Manchester, Manchester
- United Regional Medical Center, Manchester
- River Park Hospital, McMinnville
- Johnson County Community Hospital, Mountain City
- Home Care Solutions, Ooltewah
- Erlanger Bledsoe Medical Center, Pikeville
- Emerald-Hodgson Hospital, Sewanee
- DeKalb Community Hospital, Smithville
- Highlands Medical Center – Sparta, Sparta
- Harton Regional Medical Center, Tullahoma
- Southern Tennessee Medical Center, Winchester
- Stones River Hospital, Woodbury

=== Virginia ===
- Johnston Memorial Hospital, Abingdon
- Twin County Regional Hospital, Galax
- Russell County Medical Center, Lebanon
- Smyth County Community Hospital, Marion
