= Greg Martin (politician) =

American politician (born 1963)

Member of the Tennessee House of Representatives from the 26th district
- Incumbent
- Assumed office April 4, 2022
- Preceded by: Robin Smith

Personal details
- Born: July 31, 1963 (age 63)
- Party: Republican
- Spouse: Sheila Martin
- Children: 4
- Education: Bryan College (BA); New Orleans Baptist Theological Seminary (MDiv, DMin)

Greg Martin (born July 31, 1963) is an American politician. A member of the Republican Party, he has served as the representative for the 26th district in the Tennessee House of Representatives since 2022. He was originally appointed to the position by the Hamilton County Commission to succeed Robin Smith, who resigned from the legislature to plead guilty to wire fraud.

Martin is a graduate of Hixson High School and Bryan College.
