= Mark Ellen =

British television presenter and journalist

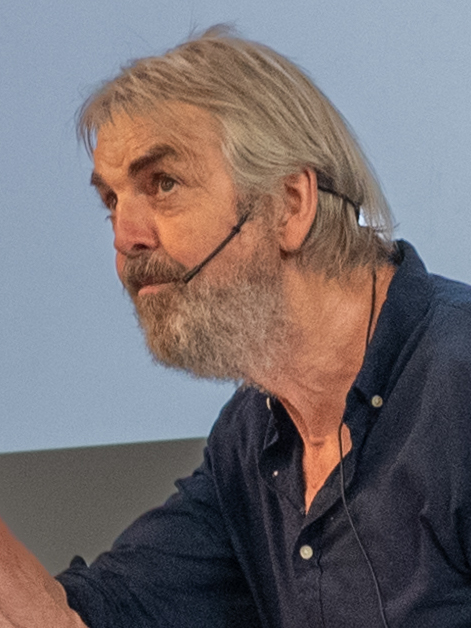
- Ellen at the 2023 Chiswick Book Festival
- Born: 16 September 1953 (age 72); Hampshire, England
- Occupations: Magazine editor, journalist

Mark Ellen (born 16 September 1953) is a British magazine editor, journalist and broadcaster.

== Early life ==
Ellen was born in Fleet, Hampshire, England. While at Oxford University in the 1970s, he briefly played bass alongside Tony Blair in college band Ugly Rumours, a band that, according to Ellen, was created primarily to meet women.

== Career ==
After graduating, he wrote for Record Mirror, NME and Time Out before signing up as features editor of Smash Hits in 1981, where he became the editor in 1983. He was the launch editor of Q, the re-launch editor of Select and the launch managing editor of Mojo. He later became the editor-in-chief of EMAP Metro, overseeing fourteeen consumer magazines, but he left Emap after 16 years to join the independent publishing company Development Hell in 2002.

He also has a long broadcasting career which includes contributions to BBC Radio 1 as stand-in for both David Jensen and John Peel. Ellen also presented the BBC television programme The Old Grey Whistle Test from 1982 to 1987. In addition, he co-presented coverage of the Live Aid concert in 1985.

Ellen was the editor of The Word, a music magazine which he started with long-time colleague, business partner and The Old Grey Whistle Test co-presenter David Hepworth. The first issue was published in February 2003 and the magazine celebrated its 50th issue in March 2007. The closure of the magazine was announced in June 2012. His awards include the PPA's Magazine Of The Year for Q and the British Society Of Magazine Editors' Mark Boxer Award in 2003. He won also the BSME's Editor's Editor Award in 2005 and again in 2011.

He now collaborates with Hepworth on Word In Your Ear, a series of music-themed live events and podcasts.

In 2014, his memoir Rock Stars Stole My Life! was published by Coronet.

== Personal life ==
Ellen lives in West London. He is a keen diver and cyclist.
