= Diversified Specialty Institute Holdings, Inc. =

US-based healthcare group

- Type: Private
- Industry: Health care
- Founded: 2003
- Headquarters: Nashville, Tennessee
- Products: Kidney dialysis
- Number of employees: 2500+

Diversified Specialty Institute is a healthcare group created in 2003 with the purpose of building and operating hospitals nationwide. While the group's primary task is the operation of over a hundred dialysis clinics around the nation, DSI is involved in hospital construction technology with operations including a breast cancer treatment facility in Bucks County, Pennsylvania, United States.

== History ==
DSI was founded in Nashville in 2003. Starting with 5 employees, DSI was able to create a modular design for hospital buildings, reducing the cost and time to create the building while improving the quality of the facility.

In April 2006, financed by Centre Partners, DSI purchased 105 dialysis clinics and four other programs from Fresenius Medical Care Holdings, Inc. The purchase made DSI the third-largest dialysis provider at the time.

In July of the same year, DSI set its first modular building in Bucks County. The modular units, produced in Conyers, Georgia, were shipped to Bucks County and a twelve-patient hospital wing was laid out in less than eight hours.

In April 2009, the hospital facility in Bucks County, Pennsylvania, filed for bankruptcy protection under Chapter 7. The bankruptcy was filed under "Bucks County Oncoplastic Institute."

PEARL

DSI and its predecessor created the medical software PEARL, which is used to track patients’ status, ensure that medications and operations are performed in a timely fashion, and allow a streamlined interface between doctors and their staffs. This system is used in all DSI facilities.

Modular Construction

From the beginning, DSI envisioned a modular construction for hospital facilities. After a rigorous production program, DSI was able to also design their first modular clinic. The facility met and exceeded health department standards.

In mid-2006, DSI laid its first modular hospital, including a twelve-patient wing, in less than eight hours. The actual time to set the building is around two days. The entire construction cycle, from the time that the building is ordered until the time that the facility receives a certificate of occupancy, is just over four months, compared to the standard six months to a year that it takes to erect a facility using standard construction methods.

== Current and future projects ==
DSI is currently working on an economical pharmaceutical service in which dialysis patients can have their prescriptions sent directly to their clinic through DSI. This service will allow patients to pick up their prescriptions at DSI instead of needing to visit their local pharmacy.
