= Glen Casada =

American politician (born 1959)

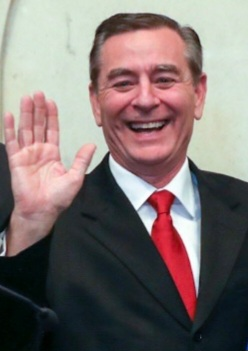
- Casada in 2019

82nd Speaker of the Tennessee House of Representatives
- In office January 8, 2019 – August 2, 2019
- Preceded by: Beth Harwell
- Succeeded by: Bill Dunn (acting)

Majority Leader of the Tennessee House of Representatives
- In office January 10, 2017 – January 8, 2019
- Preceded by: Gerald McCormick
- Succeeded by: William Lamberth

Member of the Tennessee House of Representatives from the 63rd district
- In office January 3, 2003 – January 10, 2023
- Preceded by: Mike Williams
- Succeeded by: Jake McCalmon

Personal details
- Born: Richard Glen Casada Jr. August 2, 1959 (age 67) Jeffersonville, Indiana, U.S.
- Party: Republican
- Children: 4
- Education: Western Kentucky University (BS)

Richard Glen Casada Jr. (born August 2, 1959) is an American politician, and a former Republican member of the Tennessee House of Representatives, where he represented District 63 (Williamson County) from 2003 to 2023. He was the Speaker of the Tennessee House of Representatives from January 8, 2019, through August 2, 2019, whereupon he resigned his post amid scandal. This was the shortest stint of a Tennessee Speaker of the House in modern history. Casada was previously the Majority Leader of the Tennessee House of Representatives. His opposition to Syrian refugees attracted national attention in the media in 2015.

He would later be implicated for having a role in using a firm known as Phoenix Solutions to launder money. Robin Smith pled guilty to a single count of honest service wire fraud, while also alleging that she and Casada pressured the House Republican Caucus and lawmakers to do business with Phoenix Solutions, including work on taxpayer-funded mailers. For his role in the scheme Casada was tried and sentenced to three years in prison. President Donald Trump pardoned Casada in November 2025.

== Early life ==
Glen Casada was born on August 2, 1959. He graduated from Western Kentucky University with a B.S. in Agriculture and Education in 1982.

== Career ==
In 1994, Casada was elected to the County Commission of Williamson County.

In 2003, he was elected to the Tennessee House of Representatives.

In 2022, Casada decided not to seek reelection to the Tennessee House of Representatives, citing a desire for "a new chapter of public service." Casada instead ran for the Republican nomination for Williamson County Clerk, losing to incumbent county clerk Jeff Whidby by a margin of 4,218 to 12,860 votes.

=== Barack Obama lawsuit ===
In 2009, Casada was one of the plaintiffs in a lawsuit in federal court, Captain Pamela Barnett v. Barack Hussein Obama, which claimed that Barack Obama was not an American citizen and therefore ineligible to be President of the United States. Judge David O. Carter ruled that Casada and other state legislators did not have standing to sue, since the supposed harm they feared was "highly speculative and conjectural."

=== Other actions ===
In April 2011, Casada tried to repeal a workplace non-discrimination bill for sexual orientation and gender identity in Nashville. In an interview, he explained he was trying to "create a uniform environment across the state, similar to what the interstate commerce clause does for our country." The bill was supported by David Fowler's socially conservative Family Action Council of Tennessee, and opposed by the Log Cabin Republicans.

In November 2015, Casada said he wanted to stop admitting Syrian refugees in Tennessee. He also wanted to return those who were already in the state to the U.S. Immigration and Customs Enforcement.

In October 2016, Casada ran for re-election against Democratic candidate Courtenay Rogers. Casada won the election by more than 17,000 votes (a ratio of nearly 3 to 1). In February 2017, he was selected as the Republican Majority Leader.

Casada voted for Ted Cruz in the Republican primary of the 2016 presidential election, and he voted for Donald Trump in the general election. On March 4, 2017, Casada was one of the main speakers at a rally in Legislative Plaza in Downtown Nashville to celebrate the policies of President Trump.

== 2019 scandals ==
=== Cade Cothren ===
In May 2019, several scandals broke out in the speaker's office from investigations that were conducted by WTVF, a local television station. First, it was uncovered that Casada's Chief of Staff, Cade Cothren, had possibly attempted to frame Justin Jones, a local civil rights activist, for violating a restraining order. This claim was later found to be false by a special prosecutor appointed to the case.

The text messages acquired showed Casada received one racially charged and several sexually explicit text messages from Cothren. One of the messages included Cothren who resigned his position on May 6.

Several lawmakers then encouraged Casada to resign as House Speaker as more information was revealed by the WTVF investigation.

=== Other controversies ===
It was also uncovered that Casada hired Michael Lotfi, a political operative put on the House payroll, but who did not have to report to work daily. He was only required to come "when needed." Lotfi was tasked with spinning a story to make Rep. David Byrd's sexual assault accusers look like they were fabricating their story.

The FBI opened an investigation on the controversial vote on Educational Savings Accounts (School Vouchers).

Members of the House of Representatives noticed that the additional "Research Analysts" hired, were being assigned to be "hall monitors" and track certain members of the body. Shawn Hatmaker was confirmed to be one of the "hall monitors" and was relieved of his duties.

=== Resignation as House Speaker ===
On May 8, 2019, Casada apologized to his GOP colleagues and said that he would unify the House with an action plan. He then met with the Tennessee Black Caucus of State Legislators on May 20, 2019. Later that day, the TBCSL announced that they had lost confidence in his ability to lead and asked for his resignation.

The Tennessee House Republican caucus met to discuss their future with Casada as speaker. After a 3-hour meeting, the vote was 45–24 in favor of the No-Confidence resolution. After the resolution was adopted, Republican Governor Bill Lee announced that he would consider holding a special session of the legislature to hold a removal vote if he did not resign. On May 21, 2019, Casada announced that he would resign as Speaker of the House, but would remain in the chamber as a member.

== Phoenix Solutions scandal ==
In January 2021, Casada was one of several current and former Tennessee legislators whose homes and offices were raided by the Federal Bureau of Investigation in relation to an investigation into the laundering of campaign funds. In March 2022, federal prosecutors alleged in court documents that Casada, his former chief of staff Cade Cothren, and former Tennessee House member Robin Smith had prominent roles in setting up a shadowy Chattanooga-based public relations firm known as Phoenix Solutions. Phoenix Solutions LLC would be used to provide mail and consulting services for members of the Tennessee General Assembly and also served as a source for laundering illicit campaign money.

Participants in the scheme falsely claimed that the firm was operated by an experienced political consultant named “Matthew Phoenix,” who was a fictitious person. Several state lawmakers were alleged to have participated in the scheme, with Cothren engineering the kickbacks given to Casada, Smith, and other Tennessee General Assembly members. Court documents suggested that both Casada and Cothren provided court testimony acknowledging the roles which Smith and other Tennessee General Assembly members had in the kickback scheme, though they were not named.

=== Resignation and guilty plea ===
Casada was identified as having a role in the scheme, and resigned as Speaker after it was alleged he attempted to frame a local civil rights activist. Cothren was also identified as involved. Smith pled to a single count of honest service wire fraud, while also alleging that she and Casada pressured the House Republican Caucus and lawmakers to do business with Phoenix Solutions, including work on taxpayer-funded mailers.

=== Trial ===
In August 2022 Casada and Cothren were indicted for their alleged roles in the scheme. The trial began in April 2025.

On May 16, 2025, Casada was found guilty on 17 of 19 charges including theft, bribery, kickbacks, use of a fictitious name to carry out fraud, wire fraud, and money laundering. Cothren was found guilty on all 19 charges. On September 23, 2025, Casada was sentenced to 3 years in prison. In November 2025, Casada and Cothren were both pardoned by President Donald Trump who stated that "The Biden Department of Justice significantly over-prosecuted these individuals for a minor issue".

== Personal life ==
Casada is divorced and remarried. He has four children and six grandchildren. He attends Brentwood Baptist Church.

== See also ==
- List of people granted executive clemency in the second Trump presidency

Tennessee House of Representatives
Preceded by Gerald McCormick	Majority Leader of the Tennessee House of Representatives; 2017–2019	Succeeded by William Lamberth
Political offices
Preceded by Beth Harwell	Speaker of the Tennessee House of Representatives; 2019	Succeeded by Bill Dunn; Acting
