= Camp Discovery =

Summer camp in Gainesboro, Tennessee, US

Coordinates: 36.3486°N 85.7504°W

Camp Discovery is a therapedic summer camp located at Gainesboro, Tennessee (between Nashville and Knoxville), for Tennessee-area children and adults with disabilities such as muscular dystrophy, cancer, cerebral palsy, Down syndrome, as well as various developmental disabilities.

This has been in operation since 1983. It was founded by the Tennessee Jaycee Foundation and is still operated by it.

== Background ==
In 1971, Arc of the United States asked the Jaycees to open a Foster Grandparent Program. Two years later, the ARC returned and asked to start another program for mentally disabled people. Later, the Tennessee Jaycees Foundation was established in 1977, with John Germ as the president. Less than a year later, a permanent camp site selection began for Camp Jaycee (renamed Camp Discovery in 1982 to avoid confusion). An application was made in 1980 and a lease was granted a year later to begin construction. Then in 1983, the camp officially opened and the first 125 campers arrived. Many additions such as the dining hall, log cabins, and amphitheaters further enhanced the effectiveness of this camp.
