= DontStayIn =

Social networking website

DontStayIn.com (DSI)
- Website type: Social networking service
- Available in: English
- Founded: April 2003; 23 years ago
- Dissolved: April 2016; 10 years ago
- Headquarters: London, England
- Country of origin: United Kingdom
- Owner: Love Socio Ltd
- Creators: Tim Aylott, John Brophy and Dave Brophy
- Website: dontstayin.com at the Wayback Machine (archived 1 November 2007)
- Commercial: Yes
- Registration: Required
- Launched: April 2003; 23 years ago
- Current status: Defunct

DontStayIn, commonly abbreviated to DSI, was a social networking site based around clubbing. Primarily covering the UK, it listed nearly 185,000 events, and at its peak had over five million verified members. Members were encouraged to upload picture galleries to the site for events they've attended, add events and venues and otherwise contribute. "Spotters" were DSI members who reviewed and photographed events. The format of the site allowed any user to add event listings, post comments and upload photos from anywhere in the world. DSI members were known for their loyalty to and promotion of the site. Many users commented favourably about the site and its impact on their lives when it is mentioned by reviewers. DSI users (often referred to "DSIers"), also used DontStayIn to set up events and user-groups to promote the meeting up of DSIers in real life.

== History ==
The site was also ranked continuously from April 2006 to December 2008 in the top 3 websites in the UK on Hitwise in the "Entertainment - Nightlife" category.

In 2005, DSI was featured in a documentary made by Juniper TV as part of Channel 4's "Trouble Online" series, which profiled new media enterprises that have been set up by young entrepreneurs.

In November 2006 DSI was reportedly used to organise a flash mob of 3,500 people in Paddington Station, London, UK.

On 14 April 2009, DontStayIn Ltd was acquired for an undisclosed sum by Development Hell Ltd, the publishers of The Word and Mixmag.

In December 2012 DontStayIn was taken over by Love Socio Ltd, a subsidiary company of Web Giants Ltd., and the website was revamped the following year. Both the main website and the associated Facebook page ceased being updated in mid-2016.

== Awards/history ==
=== 2003 ===
Set up by founders under initial name of "YouGotSpotted.com"

=== 2004 ===
Renamed "DontStayIn.com"

=== 2005 ===
Won the House Music Awards prize for "Best Web Resource".

=== 2006 ===
Entered the "Hitwise" top 3 for the category "Entertainment - Nightlife" in the UK Won the Hard Dance Awards "Best Website" award
Won the Musik 4 You Awards "Best Website" award

=== 2007 ===
Became number 1 in the "Hitwise" rankings for the category "Entertainment - Nightlife" in the UK - remained number 1 until Q4/2008 Won the Hard Dance Awards "Best Website" award
Won the Hardcore Heaven Awards] "Best Website" award

=== 2008 ===
Won the Hard Dance Awards "Best Website" award

=== 2009 ===
Taken over by Development Hell Ltd.

=== 2012 ===
Taken over by Love Socio Ltd, a subsidiary company of Web Giants Ltd.

=== 2013 ===
The Don't Stay In brand was updated in June 2013 followed by a complete website update. The first phase of the new update was launched in Beta in July 2013.

=== 2016 ===
Both the main DSI website and the associated Facebook page ceased to be updated in early 2016.

== DSI stats ==
From the site (as of 28 April 2009):

- Photos - Nearly 12 million photos have been uploaded to DSI so far. On average around 150,000 photos are uploaded every month and there are around 13 million photo viewings every month.
- Events - The number of events on DSI is over 210,000. Around 2500 new events are added every month.
- Verified members - There are now over 490,000 registered members on DSI. Around 2,500 new members are signing up every month. Around 35,000 log in at least once per month.
- Forum posts - There are over 20 million discussion forum posts on DSI. Over 120,000 forum posts are written every month.
