= Robin Smith (politician) =

American politician (born 1963)

Member of the Tennessee House of Representatives from the 26th district
- In office January 8, 2019 – March 7, 2022
- Preceded by: Gerald McCormick
- Succeeded by: Greg Martin

Chair of the Tennessee Republican Party
- In office August 4, 2007 – May 30, 2009
- Preceded by: Bob Davis
- Succeeded by: Chris Devaney

Personal details
- Born: Robin Smith; May 16, 1963 (age 63)
- Party: Republican
- Spouse: Scott Smith
- Children: 2
- Education: Stanford University Center for Professional Development; University of Tennessee
- Website: www.robinfortn.com

Robin Smith (born May 16, 1963) is an American Republican politician who served as the Representative for Tennessee's 26th state house district, beginning in 2018. She is a member of the Republican Party. In March 2022, she resigned and pleaded guilty to honest services wire fraud.

== Early life, family, and education ==
Smith was born in Hixson, Tennessee and now lives in Chattanooga with her husband, Scott, two children, Callie and Caleb, and Llewellin Setter, Tuck. She is Christian and attends Abba's House.

Smith graduated from Hixson High School. She attended the University of Tennessee at Chattanooga for critical care nursing. After that, she went on to receive her B.S. in critical care nursing at the University of Tennessee at Knoxville. She later graduated from Stanford Center for Professional Development at Stanford University as a Certified Project Manager in 2008.

== Career ==
Smith has served as a policy advisor to Mark E. Green since 2017. She has been a columnist for The Patriot Post since 2014 and a columnist for the Chattanooga Times Free Press since 2012. She is the senior project manager of Rivers Edge Alliance, a consulting and project management company. She is a member of Hamilton County Republican Women's Club of Chattanooga, Tennessee, and served as chair from 1998 to 2002.

Smith is a member of the University of Tennessee Alumni Association, Hixson High Alumni Association, Turning Point USA, Concerned Women for America, and The Heritage Foundation.

== Tennessee House of Representatives ==
Smith was a State Representative for Tennessee's 26th District which covers Harrison, Hixson, Lakesite, Lupton City, Stuart Heights, Riverview and North Chattanooga until March 7, 2022. She was a candidate for Tennessee State House of Representatives, District 26 in 2018. She was also a candidate for Tennessee's 3rd congressional district in 2010.

Smith was unanimously elected State Chair of the Republican Party on August 4, 2007. During her time as chairman, she created two coalition groups in Tennessee, The Republican National Hispanic Assembly of Tennessee and the Republican Jewish Coalition of Tennessee and started a sustainable fund raising program. During this time as well, she was appointed to the Tennessee Human Rights Commission.

=== Committees ===
Smith was a member of these Tennessee House committees:

- Health committee
- Life and Health Insurance subcommittee
- Select committee on Ethics
- Ethics subcommittee
- Facilities, Licensure, and Regulation Subcommittee
- Workplace Discrimination and Harassment Subcommittee
- Calendar and Rules committee

She is also chair of the Tennessee House Insurance committee.

== Federal Indictment, Resignation and Guilty Plea ==
On March 7, 2022, Smith was indicted for federal wire fraud, and resigned. According to a court document which was filed in U.S. District Court, Smith engaged in a fraudulent scheme with others to contract Phoenix Solutions, LLC into providing mail and consulting services for members of the Tennessee General Assembly.

The court document also revealed that Smith and others falsely claimed that Phoenix Solutions was operated by an experienced political consultant named “Matthew Phoenix", when no such person existed. Witnesses acknowledging this included state lawmaker and former Speaker of the House Glen Casada and his former chief of staff Cade Cothren, though they were only named by their professions in the court document acknowledging their testimony. Cothren personally ran the firm, which acted as an illicit campaign vendor, and engineered the kickbacks which were given to Smith, Casada and some other members of the Tennessee General Assembly.

On March 8, 2022, Smith pleaded guilty in federal court to a single count of honest services wire fraud. In a statement made though Chattanooga-based Waterhouse Public Relations, Smith stated that she and Casada pressured the House Republican Caucus and lawmakers to do business with Phoenix Solutions, including work on taxpayer-funded mailers.

In October 2025, Smith was sentenced to eight months in prison.

== Elections ==
Date	Election	%
08/05/10	TN, District 3-R Primary	28.11% (lost)
11/06/18	TN State House, District 26	64.08% (won)
