= Bobby Wood (American politician) =

American politician (1935–2023)

Member of the Tennessee House of Representatives from the 26th district
- In office January 11, 1977 – January 11, 2005
- Preceded by: Ray White
- Succeeded by: Gerald McCormick

Personal details
- Born: September 21, 1935 Fyffe, Alabama, U.S.
- Died: January 12, 2023 (aged 87) Harrison, Tennessee, U.S.
- Party: Republican
- Spouse(s): Gladys Eldridge; Jeanne Wood
- Children: 2
- Education: University of Tennessee; University of Tennessee at Chattanooga
- Website: House website

Bobby Glendon Wood (September 21, 1935 – January 12, 2023) was an American politician.

== Life and career ==
Wood was born in Fyffe, Alabama on September 21, 1935. He lived in Harrison, Tennessee, with his wife and family, and was involved with the insurance business and the Chattanooga Glass Company. Wood served in the Tennessee House of Representatives from 1976 to 2004 and was a Republican. Wood died at his home in Harrison on January 12, 2023, at the age of 87.
