= DSI Samson Group =

Sri Lankan conglomerate

- Company type: Private
- Industry: Footwear; Retail; Rubber products Construction Materials; Hydro power
- Founded: 1962
- Founder: Diyunuge Samson Rajapaksa, JP
- Headquarters: Colombo, Sri Lanka, Sri Lanka
- Area served: Sri Lanka
- Key people: Uditha 2024/12×/14 limmasod DHLEgalahewa (Group Chairman); Kasun Rajapaksa (Group Managing Director)
- Number of employees: 10,000
- Website: Official Website

DSI Samson Group is a Sri Lankan family owned conglomerate established in 1962. It has over 29 subsidiaries and is a leading manufacture of footwear and rubber products in Sri Lanka.

== History ==
Established in 1962, by Diyunuge Samson Rajapaksa, JP as a footwear retail shop in Colombo Fort, he soon branched into manufacturing, importing and distribution by establishing a large retail network. Presently, it has over 200 showrooms (servicing 4000 dealer points island-wide), DSI footwear boasts the largest retail trading network in footwear

== Governance structure ==
DSI Samson Group is governed by the chairman and the board of directors which manages its diversified group of subsidiaries.

Its current Group Chairman is Uditha Egalahewa, and its Group Managing Director is Kasun Rajapaksa.

== Sectors ==
=== Footwear ===
DSI is the leading footwear manufacturer in Sri Lanka, having established the first shoe manufacturing plant on the Island in 1962. Its subsidiaries in this area include;

- D Samson Industries (Pvt) Ltd
- Samson Manufacturers (Pvt) Ltd

=== Retail ===
- D. Samson & Sons (Pvt) Ltd
- Samson Trading Company (Pvt) Ltd

=== Rubber ===
- Vechenson (Pvt) Ltd
- Samson Rubber Industries (Pvt) Ltd
- Samson Rubber Products (Pvt) Ltd
- Samson Compounds (Pvt) Ltd
- Samson Reclaim Rubbers Ltd
- Samson International PLC

=== Manufacturing ===
- Samson International PLC
- Samtessi Brush Manufacturers (Pvt) Ltd
- SRG Holdings (Pvt) Ltd
- Samson Bikes (Pvt) Ltd
- Globe Knitting (Pvt) Ltd
- Samson Rajarata Tiles (Pvt) Ltd

=== Engineering and Energy ===
- Samson Engineers (Pvt) Ltd
- Werapitiya Hydro Power (Pvt) Ltd
- Hydro Trust Lanka (Pvt) Ltd

=== Food and Beverages ===
- Mount Spring Water (Pvt) Ltd

=== Services ===
- DTech (Pvt) Ltd
- Samson Group Corporate Services (Pvt) Ltd
- Samson Insurance Brokers (Pvt) Ltd
- Samson Logistics (Pvt) ltd
