= Dialysis Clinic, Inc. =

American nonprofit dialysis center chain

Dialysis Clinic, Inc. is a nonprofit medical corporation founded in 1971 and chartered as a 501(c)(3) tax-exempt organization under IRS regulations.

It was founded for care and research of patients with kidney disease and supports activities in kidney transplant and dialysis across the US. It is headquartered in Nashville, Tennessee.

== History ==
=== Inception ===
Dialysis Clinic, Inc. (DCI) was founded in 1971 by Dr. Keith Johnson.

In December 1970, things were beginning to take shape. Upon incorporation, the decision had to be made whether DCI would be for-profit or nonprofit. Dr. Johnson and his team unanimously decided on the non-profit status and also determined that any excess revenues generated would be used for research and education in the field of kidney disease or in other ways that would benefit people with kidney disease. Just five months later, in April 1971, Dialysis Clinic, Incorporated, was established, a location was secured for the first clinic, negotiations were held with the hospital to move the patients over to the new facility, and patients began dialyzing.

The first DCI clinic was housed in a 1,000 square foot, refurbished home on 21st Avenue in Nashville, Tennessee. In 1971, with DCI’s first clinic already operating, there was no Medicare funding and most patients still did not have insurance to cover the cost of treatment. Dr. Johnson and his staff asked Kentucky Fried Chicken for KFC buckets to collect donations. Then the staff placed pictures of patients on their red and white buckets. On Saturday and Sunday afternoons, the staff made their way to the busiest intersections in Nashville. On a good weekend, they could raise $10,000 to help pay for treatments, but it would only last for so long and then they would be out conducting road blocks again. In 1973, the Medicare ESRD Program began, and thousands of dialysis patients across the U.S. were able to receive treatment that was and still is paid for by that program.

=== In 2016 ===
In 2016, DCI operated more than 235 dialysis clinics, not including the acute facilities within hospitals. It is the fourth largest dialysis provider in the US. DCI employed more than 5,000 people and served more than 15,000 patients across 28 states. DCI is the only leading dialysis provider to have remained under its own control since its founding. It has successfully remained non-profit and has had the lowest standard mortality rates and standard hospitalization rates among large dialysis providers for the past 13 years. DCI today operates under the mission: "We are a Non-Profit Service Organization. The Care of the Patient is Our Reason for Existence."

== DCI Donor Services ==
Facilitating kidney and other organ and tissue donation was the logical next step in the vertical integration of DCI as the comprehensive care provider for those in need of organ and tissue transplants. To accomplish this purpose, DCI established DCI Donor Services (DCIDS) as an independent nonprofit company. In 2016, it operated three organ procurement organizations: Tennessee Donor Services, New Mexico Donor Services, and Sierra Donor Services, in California, and one tissue bank: DCI Donor Services Tissue Bank.

== DCI Laboratory ==
DCI Laboratory, founded in 1988 as a division of Dialysis Clinic, Inc., is a laboratory responding specifically to the needs of dialysis patients. DCI's laboratory division was established in response to nephrologists’ request for personnel and instrumentation in tune with the dialysis community. DCI Laboratory provides services and testing technologies for health care providers and their ESRD patients, including:

- Clinical Chemistry
- Hematology
- Immunochemistry
- LAL (Endotoxin) Testing
- Water Analysis
- Dialysate and Water Cultures
- Dialysate Chemistries
- HIV Testing
- Serum Aluminum and Zinc
- On-line Data Transmission
- Lab Petri dishes

== DCI Partnership with Tufts Medical Center ==
=== Location ===
The Dialysis Clinic, Inc.'s partner location with Tufts Medical Center is located adjacent to Tufts Medical Center and their Nephrology division at 35 Kneeland St, 5th floor, Boston, MA 02111.

=== Mission ===
The care of the patient is the reason for Dialysis Clinic, Inc.'s existence. The values of non-profit, quality, integrity, service, and leadership drive Dialysis Clinic, Inc. towards this goal. The group looks to be the quality leader in the kidney community, save lives, and reduce hospitalizations, and empower each patient to live their best possible life.

=== Patients and Communities Served ===
Tufts Medical Center and the Dialysis Clinic, Inc. provide care to patients with chronic kidney disease in the Boston area. Patients undergoing dialysis at Tufts Medical Center suffer from End-State Renal Disease.

=== Tufts Medical Center Division of Nephrology History ===
Tufts Medical Center has been providing kidney care in Boston since 1971. William B. Schwartz founded the Division of Nephrology at Tufts University School of Medicine and the New England Medical Center's division of Nephrology in 1950. Schwartz was an integral part of the Division of Nephrology at Tufts Medical Center, remaining involved with the group until 1976. Between 1976 and 1986, Tufts Medical Center began several programs within the Nephrology division and engaged in multiple affiliations at a variety of hospitals including St. Elizabeth's Hospital in Brighton, MA. Tufts University School of Medicine and the Division of Nephrology have been extremely influential since the group's inception in the research space, specifically in relation to diet and other affects human habits have on kidney health. In 1986 Tufts Medical Center partnered with Dialysis Clinic, Inc. to extend its efforts of providing care to patients with chronic kidney disease.

=== Tufts Medical Center's Impact on DCI's Development of Kidney Care ===
One of the most notable practices that Tufts Medical Center engaged in after 1976 was the publishing of the "Nephrology Forum" in Kidney International. Nephrology Forum was the most widely-recognized global nephrology update and continued for 27 years with 326 forums being held.

In 1986, Tufts Medical Center formally announced their partnership with the Not-for-profit dialysis provider, Dialysis Clinic, Inc. Since 1986, Tufts Medical Center and Dialysis Clinic, Inc. have been able to achieve several remarkable milestones.

One of the most beneficial aspects of the partnership has been Tufts Medical Center's ability to conduct numerous studies on Chronic Kidney Disease treatments and their effects on the health of patients with Chronic Kidney Disease. In 1991, Tufts Medical Center and Dialysis Clinic, Inc. studies the transmission of the Hepatits C virus by organ transplantation. From 1992-2003, Tufts Medical Center in conjunction with Dialysis Clinic, Inc. was able to study the effect of dialysis dose and membrane flux in maintenance of hemodialysis. By having the opportunity to study how varying dialysis doses along with permeability of the dialyzer membrane (membrane flux), Dialysis Clinic, Inc.'s partnership with Tufts Medical Center allowed them to provide more effective care to patients undergoing hemodialysis. The ability for Tufts Medical Center to perform nephrology research and other areas of kidney care has allowed Dialysis Clinic, Inc. to provide its patients with Chronic Kidney Disease with a higher level of care.

In 1994, Tufts Medical Center and Dialysis Clinic, Inc. were able to implement patients based outcome assessments. The partnership monitored and studied both dialysis patient's health status and their patients satisfaction with their hemodialysis treatment, further elevating the level of care being provided.

In 1995, Tufts Medical Center began the practice of comprehensive electronic medical record for Dialysis Clinic, Inc. nationally. The establishment of a national electronic health record system allowed for a standardization of medical records for Dialysis Clinic nationally, increasing interoperability between practice locations.

In 1998, Tufts Medical Center published research on the effects of Chronic Kidney Disease as a risk factor for cardiovascular disease. The findings of research have noticed impacts Chronic Kidney Disease can have on increasing risks for Cardiovascular disease. Because of this, Dialysis Clinic, Inc. now provides recommendations for nutritional habits to mitigate potential risks for Cardiovascular disease as a result of Chronic Kidney Disease

In 2000, Tufts Medical Center published research on pre-dialysis care and how optimized care prior to beginning dialysis can improve dialysis results.

Since 2000, Tufts Medical Center has conducted numerous studies in the Nephrology space. As a result of this, Dialysis Clinic, Inc. has been able to implement research findings to provide a superior product of care for its dialysis patients.

== Office of Clinical Research ==
DCI’s Office of Clinical Research was established in 2007 to review all studies (industry or investigator-initiated) being proposed to be conducted in DCI facilities to ensure the research is scientifically rigorous and valid and that the appropriate procedures for human protections are being followed. In 2016, the Office of Clinical Research now played a major role in facilitating multisite projects through identifying and confirming participation from the clinics and investigators that are best suited to a particular project, preparing budgets and IRB documents, orchestrating data transfers from the Medical Information System (MIS) and serving as a liaison between study Sponsors, individual investigators/research sites, and the dialysis staff.
