= Kidney dialysis =

Medical therapy for kidney failure

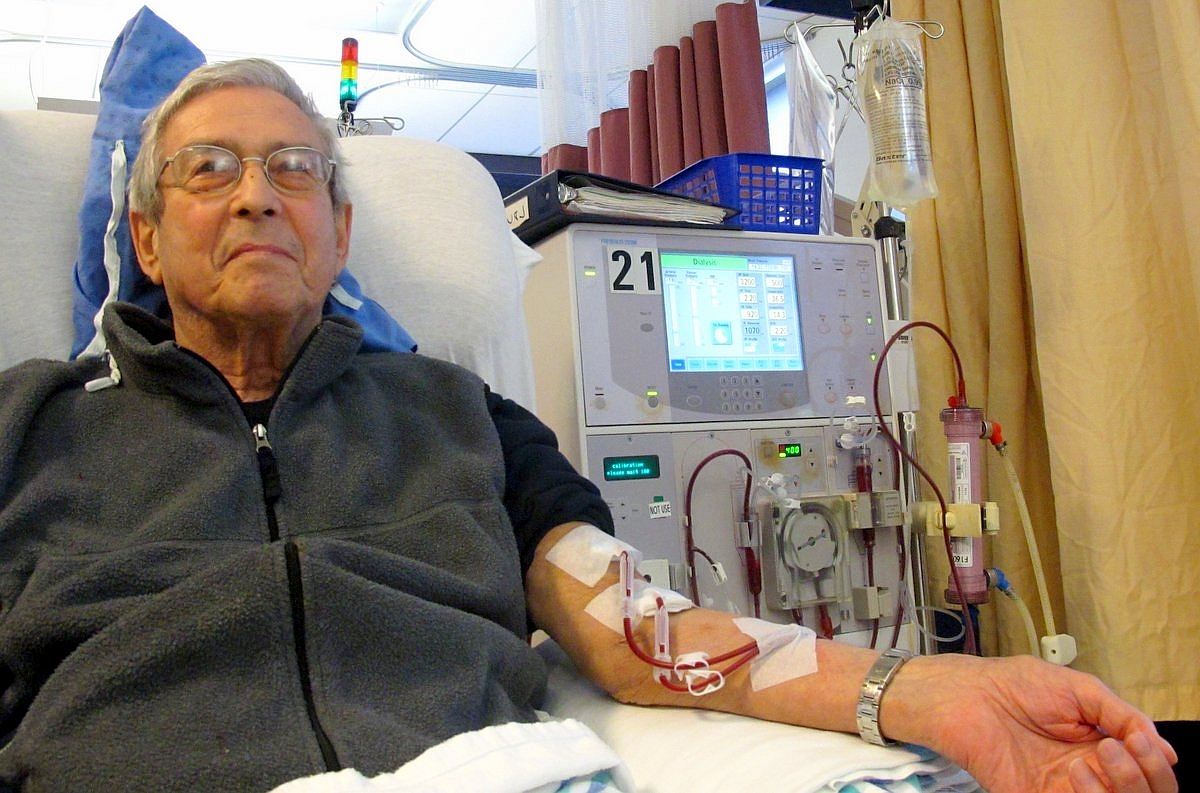
- Patient receiving hemodialysis
- Specialty: Nephrology
- ICD-9-CM: 39.95
- MeSH: D006435

Schematic of semipermeable membrane during hemodialysis, where blood is red, dialysing fluid is blue, and the membrane is yellow

Kidney dialysis (Note: From Greek διάλυσις, dialysis, 'dissolution'; from διά, dia, 'through', and λύσις, lysis, 'loosening or splitting') is the process of removing excess water, solutes, and toxins from the blood in people whose kidneys can no longer perform these functions naturally. Along with kidney transplantation, it is a type of renal replacement therapy.

Dialysis may need to be initiated when there is a sudden rapid loss of kidney function, known as acute kidney injury (previously called acute renal failure), or when a gradual decline in kidney function, chronic kidney failure, reaches stage 5. Stage 5 chronic renal failure is reached when the glomerular filtration rate is less than 15% of the normal, creatinine clearance is less than 10 mL per minute, and uremia is present.

Dialysis is used as a temporary measure in cases of acute kidney injury or for those awaiting kidney transplant and as a permanent measure in those for whom a transplant is not indicated or not possible.

In West European countries, Australia, Canada, the United Kingdom, and the United States, dialysis is paid for by the government for those who are eligible. The first successful dialysis was performed in 1943.

== Background ==
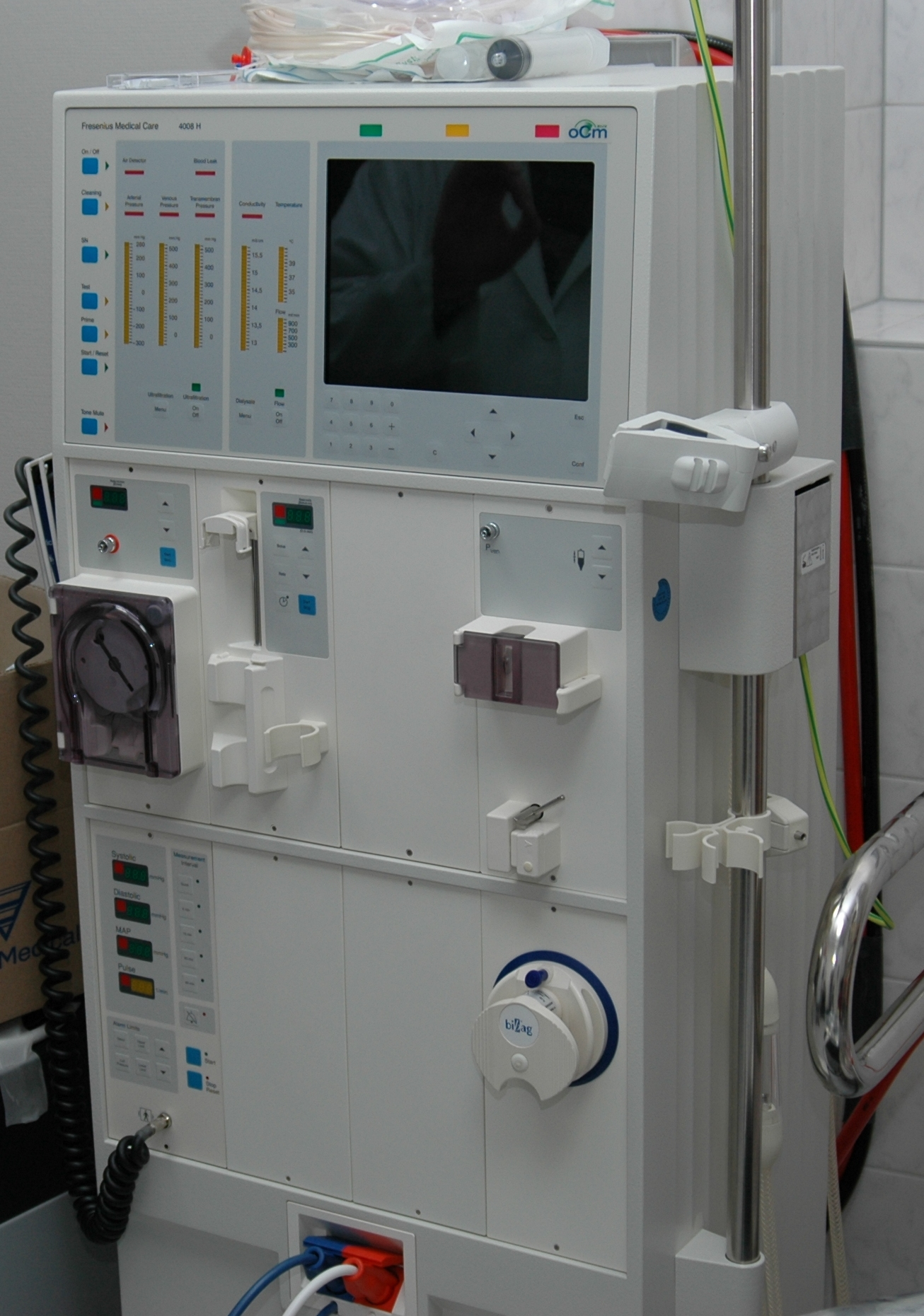
A hemodialysis machine

The kidneys have an important role in maintaining health. When the person is healthy, the kidneys maintain the body's internal equilibrium of water and minerals (sodium, potassium, chloride, calcium, phosphorus, magnesium, sulphate). The acidic metabolism end-products that the body cannot get rid of via respiration are also excreted through the kidneys. The kidneys also function as a part of the endocrine system, producing erythropoietin, calcitriol and renin. Erythropoietin is involved in the production of red blood cells and calcitriol plays a role in bone formation. Dialysis is an imperfect treatment to replace kidney function because it does not correct the compromised endocrine functions of the kidney. Dialysis treatments replace some of these functions through diffusion (waste removal) and ultrafiltration (fluid removal). Dialysis uses highly purified (also known as "ultrapure") water.

== Principle ==
Dialysis works on the principles of the diffusion of solutes and ultrafiltration of fluid across a semipermeable membrane. Diffusion is a property of substances in water; substances in water tend to move from an area of high concentration to an area of low concentration. Blood flows by one side of a semipermeable membrane, and a dialysate, or special dialysis fluid, flows by the opposite side. A semipermeable membrane is a thin layer of material that contains holes of various sizes, or pores. Smaller solutes and fluid pass through the membrane, but the membrane blocks the passage of larger substances (for example, red blood cells and large proteins). This replicates the filtering process that takes place in the kidneys when the blood enters the kidneys and the larger substances are separated from the smaller ones in the glomerulus.

Osmosis, diffusion, ultrafiltration, and dialysis

The two main types of dialysis, hemodialysis and peritoneal dialysis, remove wastes and excess water from the blood in different ways. Hemodialysis removes wastes and water by circulating blood outside the body through an external filter, called a dialyzer, that contains a semipermeable membrane. The blood flows in one direction and the dialysate flows in the opposite. The counter-current flow of the blood and dialysate maximizes the concentration gradient of solutes between the blood and dialysate, which helps to remove more urea and creatinine from the blood. The concentrations of solutes normally found in the urine (for example potassium, phosphorus and urea) are undesirably high in the blood, but low or absent in the dialysis solution, and constant replacement of the dialysate ensures that the concentration of undesired solutes is kept low on this side of the membrane. The dialysis solution has levels of minerals like potassium and calcium that are similar to their natural concentration in healthy blood. For another solute, bicarbonate, dialysis solution level is set at a slightly higher level than in normal blood, to encourage the diffusion of bicarbonate into the blood, to act as a pH buffer to neutralize the metabolic acidosis that is often present in these patients. The levels of the components of dialysate are typically prescribed by a nephrologist according to the needs of the individual patient.

In peritoneal dialysis, wastes and water are removed from the blood inside the body using the peritoneum as a natural semipermeable membrane. Waste and excess water move from the blood, across the visceral peritoneum due to its large surface area and into a special dialysis solution, called dialysate, in the peritoneal cavity within the abdomen.

== Types ==
There are three primary and two secondary types of dialysis: hemodialysis (primary), peritoneal dialysis (primary), hemofiltration (primary), hemodiafiltration (secondary) and intestinal dialysis (secondary).

=== Hemodialysis ===

In hemodialysis, the patient's blood is pumped through the blood compartment of a dialyzer, exposing it to a partially permeable membrane. The dialyzer is composed of thousands of tiny hollow synthetic fibers. The fiber wall acts as the semipermeable membrane. Blood flows through the fibers, dialysis solution flows around the outside of the fibers, and water and wastes move between these two solutions. The cleansed blood is then returned via the circuit back to the body. Ultrafiltration occurs by increasing the hydrostatic pressure across the dialyzer membrane. This usually is done by applying a negative pressure to the dialysate compartment of the dialyzer. This pressure gradient causes water and dissolved solutes to move from blood to dialysate and allows the removal of several litres of excess fluid during a typical 4-hour treatment. In the United States, hemodialysis treatments are typically given in a dialysis center three times per week (due in the United States to Medicare reimbursement rules); however, as of 2005 over 2,500 people in the United States are dialyzing at home more frequently for various treatment lengths. Studies have demonstrated the clinical benefits of dialyzing 5 to 7 times a week, for 6 to 8 hours. This type of hemodialysis is usually called nocturnal daily hemodialysis and a study has shown it provides a significant improvement in both small and large molecular weight clearance and decreases the need for phosphate binders. These frequent long treatments are often done at home while sleeping, but home dialysis is a flexible modality and schedules can be changed day to day, week to week. In general, studies show that both increased treatment length and frequency are clinically beneficial.

Hemo-dialysis was one of the most common procedures performed in U.S. hospitals in 2011, occurring in 909,000 stays (a rate of 29 stays per 10,000 population).

=== Peritoneal dialysis ===
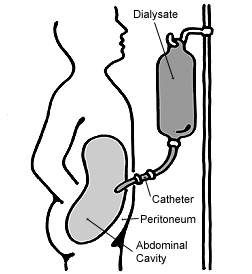
Schematic diagram of peritoneal dialysis

In peritoneal dialysis, a sterile solution containing glucose (called dialysate) is run through a tube into the peritoneal cavity, the abdominal body cavity around the intestine, where the peritoneal membrane acts as a partially permeable membrane.

This exchange is repeated 4–5 times per day; automatic systems can run more frequent exchange cycles overnight. Peritoneal dialysis is less efficient than hemodialysis, but because it is carried out for a longer period of time the net effect in terms of removal of waste products and of salt and water are similar to hemodialysis. Peritoneal dialysis is carried out at home by the patient, often without help. This frees patients from the routine of having to go to a dialysis clinic on a fixed schedule multiple times per week. Peritoneal dialysis can be performed with little to no specialized equipment (other than bags of fresh dialysate).

=== Hemofiltration ===
Continuous veno-venous haemofiltration with pre- and post-dilution (CVVH)

Hemofiltration is a similar treatment to hemodialysis, but it makes use of a different principle. The blood is pumped through a dialyzer or "hemofilter" as in dialysis, but no dialysate is used. A pressure gradient is applied; as a result, water moves across the very permeable membrane rapidly, "dragging" along with it many dissolved substances, including ones with large molecular weights, which are not cleared as well by hemodialysis. Salts and water lost from the blood during this process are replaced with a "substitution fluid" that is infused into the extracorporeal circuit during the treatment.

=== Hemodiafiltration ===
Continuous veno-venous haemodiafiltration (CVVHDF)

Hemodiafiltration is a combination between hemodialysis and hemofiltration, thus used to purify the blood from toxins when the kidney is not working normally and also used to treat acute kidney injury (AKI).

=== Intestinal dialysis ===
In healthy humans, the intestines both remove uremic toxins (urea, creatine, uric acid) from blood and add uremic toxins (indoxyl sulfate, ammonia, etc.) to blood. More uremic toxins are excreted through the gut (as feces) than through the kidneys (as urine). This exchange of substances is enabled by the massive surface area of the intestinal capillary network and intestinal mucus, together serving as a large semipermeable membrane. In patients with kidney failure, the intestines receive a larger influx of uremic toxins due to a higher concentration in blood, but this does not automatically translate to a benefit in reducing blood toxin levels as gut bacteria use these toxins as food, producing more toxins in the process. The goal of intestinal dialysis is to maximize the removal of uremic toxins into the intestines while minimizing the production of new toxin molecules in the intestines. It serves as a more conservative renal replacement therapy for those unable to tolerate conventional dialysis. There are a few forms of intestinal dialysis:

- Small bowel/intestinal dialysis puts the dialysate in the small intestines through a surgical opening (ileostomy), using the intestinal walls as the semipermeable membrane for removing toxins. It did not show any actual survival benefit overall and was replaced by modern dialysis methods.
- Induced diarrhea has been found to provide toxin removal in small, non-randomly controlled studies. One method uses the ingestion of 1 to 1.5 liters of non-absorbable solutions of polyethylene glycol or mannitol every fourth hour.
- Colonic dialysis puts the dialysate in the colon, which can be done without a surgical opening: an anal catheter inserted through the anus can reach the ascending colon and inject the dialysate there. The clinical use of colonic dialysis is still in its early stages (as of 2020), being studied mainly in Iran and China.
- Oral adsorbents are used in hope that they will absorb toxins as they pass through the gut. One of them, AST-120, has undergone two multinational randomized controlled trials in which it failed to show a benefit in slowing CKD progression. However, a post-hoc analysis finds some benefit in a subgroup of patients.

A related development is supplementation with soluble fibres such as acacia fibre into the diet. These fibers are digested by bacteria in the colon. This bacterial growth increases the amount of nitrogen that is eliminated in fecal waste.

== Indications ==
The decision to initiate dialysis or hemofiltration in patients with kidney failure depends on several factors. These can be divided into acute or chronic indications.

Depression and kidney failure symptoms can be similar to each other. It is important that there is open communication between a dialysis team and the patient. Open communication will allow giving a better quality of life. Knowing the patients' needs will allow the dialysis team to provide more options like: changes in dialysis type like home dialysis for patients to be able to be more active or changes in eating habits to avoid unnecessary waste products.

=== Acute indications ===
Indications for dialysis in a patient with acute kidney injury are summarized with the vowel mnemonic of "AEIOU":

1. Acidemia from metabolic acidosis in situations in which correction with sodium bicarbonate is impractical or may result in fluid overload.
2. Electrolyte abnormality, such as severe hyperkalemia, especially when combined with AKI.
3. Intoxication, that is, acute poisoning with a dialyzable substance. These substances can be represented by the mnemonic SLIME: salicylic acid, lithium, isopropanol, magnesium-containing laxatives and ethylene glycol.
4. Overload of fluid not expected to respond to treatment with diuretics
5. Uremia complications, such as pericarditis, encephalopathy, or gastrointestinal bleeding.

=== Chronic indications ===
Chronic dialysis may be indicated when a patient has symptomatic kidney failure and low glomerular filtration rate (GFR < 15 mL/min). Between 1996 and 2008, there was a trend to initiate dialysis at progressively higher estimated GFR, eGFR. A review of the evidence shows no benefit or potential harm with early dialysis initiation, which has been defined by start of dialysis at an estimated GFR of greater than 10 ml/min/1.73^{2}. Observational data from large registries of dialysis patients suggests that early start of dialysis may be harmful. The most recent published guidelines from Canada, for when to initiate dialysis, recommend an intent to defer dialysis until a patient has definite kidney failure symptoms, which may occur at an estimated GFR of 5–9 ml/min/1.73^{2}.

== Impact ==
=== Effectiveness ===
Even though it is not a cure for kidney failure, dialysis is a very effective treatment. Survival rates of kidney failure are generally longer with dialysis than without (having only conservative kidney management). However, from the age of 80 and in elderly patients with comorbidities there is no difference in survival between the two groups.

=== Quality of life ===
Dialysis is an intensive treatment that has a serious impact on those treated with it. Being on dialysis usually leads to a poor quality of life. However, there are strategies that can make it more tolerable. Receiving dialysis at home might improve people's quality of life and autonomy.

=== Scheduling and adherence ===
Dialysis is typically on a regular schedule of three times a week.

Given that dialysis patients have little or no capacity to filtrate solutes and regulate their fluid volume due to kidney dysfunction, missing dialysis is potentially lethal. These patients can be hyperkalaemic, leading to cardiac dysrhythmias and potential cardiac arrest, as well as fluid in the alveoli of their lungs which can impair breathing.

Some medications can be used in the short term to decrease serum potassium and stabilise the cardiac muscle so as to facilitate stabilisation of acute patients in the setting of missed dialysis. Salbutamol and insulin can decrease serum potassium by up to 1.0mmol/L each by shifting potassium from the extracellular space into the intracellular spaces within skeletal muscle cells, and calcium gluconate is used to stabilise the myocardium in hyperkalaemic patients, in an attempt to reduce the likelihood of lethal arrhythmias arising from a high serum potassium.

=== Survival without dialysis ===
People who decide against dialysis treatment when reaching end-stage chronic kidney disease could survive several years and experience improvements in their mental well-being in addition to sustained physical well-being and overall quality of life until late in their illness course. However, use of acute care services in these cases is common and intensity of end-of-life care is highly variable among people opting out of dialysis.

=== Life Expectancy After Starting Kidney Dialysis ===
Life expectancy after starting kidney dialysis for end-stage kidney disease (ESKD) varies significantly based on factors such as age, comorbidities, dialysis modality, and access to healthcare. Dialysis extends life compared to untreated ESKD but does not restore normal kidney function. Median survival is approximately 3–5 years, with 5-year survival rates around 35–42% for hemodialysis (HD) patients. Mortality is highest in the first year (15–20%), primarily from cardiovascular events or infections.

== Overall survival ==
For incident dialysis patients (mean age ~65 years), median survival is about 3 years, with adjusted mortality rates of 187.7 per 1,000 patient-years.

1-year survival: 80–85% overall; 60–70% for patients ≥65 years. 3-year survival: ~57% for HD, ~68% for peritoneal dialysis (PD). 5-year survival: 35–42% for HD; PD outcomes converge long-term.

== Survival by age ==
Survival rate of dialysis patients drops significantly with their age. Peritoneal dialysis has a little better outcome than hemodialysis, particularly for older patients.

Age group	Modality	survival rate (%)			
Age group	Modality	1 year	3 year	5 year	10 year
<45	hemodialysis	92	80	70	
<45	peritoneal	94	82	72	
45–64	hemodialysis	88	70	55	
45–64	peritoneal	90	74	58	
65–74	hemodialysis	82	57	40	
65–74	peritoneal	85	62	45	
75–84	hemodialysis	70	37	20	
75–84	peritoneal	75	45	28	
85+	hemodialysis	50	15	5	
85+	peritoneal	60	25	10	

For a 55-year-old, expected survival is ~5 years on dialysis vs. 26 years in the general population.

Patients ≥80 years have ~50–60% 1-year survival with planned HD starts.

== Dialysis modality ==
Hemodialysis (HD): Used by ~88% of patients; 5-year survival ~40%. Higher early mortality from urgent starts. Peritoneal dialysis (PD): Better early survival due to home-based flexibility; outcomes equalize after 2–3 years. May improve quality of life short-term. Exceptional cases survive 20–30+ years with optimal care.

== Factors affecting survival ==
=== Positive factors ===
Younger age, fewer comorbidities, good nutrition (higher BMI/albumin), planned dialysis start, home therapies.

=== Negative factors ===
Diabetes, cardiovascular disease, urgent initiation, inadequate dialysis (Kt/V <1.2), infections. COVID-19 increased mortality in 2020 but rates declined by 2022.

In low-resource settings, median survival may be ~1.5 years due to access barriers.

== Comparison to alternatives ==
Kidney transplantation offers superior survival (~80% at 5 years) and is recommended when eligible. For frail elderly patients, conservative management without dialysis may yield similar survival but better quality of life.

== Pediatric dialysis ==
Over the past 20 years, children have benefited from major improvements in both technology and clinical management of dialysis. Morbidity during dialysis sessions has decreased with seizures being exceptional and hypotensive episodes rare. Pain and discomfort have been reduced with the use of chronic internal jugular venous catheters and anesthetic creams for fistula puncture. Non-invasive technologies to assess patient target dry weight and access flow can significantly reduce patient morbidity and health care costs. Mortality in paediatric and young adult patients on chronic hemodialysis is associated with multifactorial markers of nutrition, inflammation, anaemia and dialysis dose, which highlights the importance of multimodal intervention strategies besides adequate hemodialysis treatment as determined by Kt/V alone.

Biocompatible synthetic membranes, specific small size material dialyzers and new low extra-corporeal volume tubing have been developed for young infants. Arterial and venous tubing length is made of minimum length and diameter, a <80 ml to <110 ml volume tubing is designed for pediatric patients and a >130 to <224 ml tubing are for adult patients, regardless of blood pump segment size, which can be of 6.4 mm for normal dialysis or 8.0mm for high flux dialysis in all patients. All dialysis machine manufacturers design their machine to do the pediatric dialysis. In pediatric patients, the pump speed should be kept at low side, according to patient blood output capacity, and the clotting with heparin dose should be carefully monitored. The high flux dialysis (see below) is not recommended for pediatric patients.

In children, hemodialysis must be individualized and viewed as an "integrated therapy" that considers their long-term exposure to chronic renal failure treatment. Dialysis is seen only as a temporary measure for children compared with renal transplantation because this enables the best chance of rehabilitation in terms of educational and psychosocial functioning. Long-term chronic dialysis, however, the highest standards should be applied to these children to preserve their future "cardiovascular life"—which might include more dialysis time and on-line hemodiafiltration online hdf with synthetic high flux membranes with the surface area of 0.2 m^{2} to 0.8 m^{2} and blood tubing lines with the low volume yet large blood pump segment of 6.4/8.0 mm, if we are able to improve on the rather restricted concept of small-solute urea dialysis clearance.

== Dialyzable substances ==
=== Characteristics ===
Dialyzable substances—substances removable with dialysis—have these properties:

1. Low molecular mass
2. High water solubility
3. Low protein binding capacity
4. Prolonged elimination (long half-life)
5. Small volume of distribution

=== Substances ===
- Ethylene glycol
- Procainamide
- Methanol
- Isopropyl alcohol
- Barbiturates
- Lithium
- Bromide
- Sotalol
- Chloral hydrate
- Ethanol
- Acetone
- Atenolol
- Theophylline
- Salicylates
- Baclofen

== Dialysis in different countries ==
=== United Kingdom ===
The National Health Service provides dialysis in the United Kingdom. In 2022, there were more than 30,000 people on dialysis in the UK.

For people who need to travel to dialysis centres, patient transport services are generally provided without charge. Cornwall Clinical Commissioning Group proposed to restrict this provision to people who did not have specific medical or financial reasons in 2018 but changed their minds after a campaign led by Kidney Care UK and decided to fund transport for people requiring dialysis three times a week for a minimum or six times a month for a minimum of three months.

==== Home dialysis ====
UK clinical guidelines recommend offering people a choice regarding where they get their dialysis. Research in the UK found that receiving dialysis at home can lead to better quality of life and is less costly than receiving dialysis in hospital. However, many people in the UK prefer to receive dialysis in hospital: In 2022, only 1 in 6 chose receiving it at home.

There are various reasons why people do not choose home dialysis. Among these are preferring hospitals as a way of getting regular social contact, being concerned about necessary changes to their homes and their family members becoming carers. Other reasons include a lack of motivation, doubting abilities for self-managed treatment, and not having suitable housing or support at home. Hospital dialysis is also often presented as the norm by healthcare professionals.

Encouraging people to have dialysis at home could reduce the impact of dialysis on people's social and professional lives. Some ways to help are offering peer support from other people on home dialysis, better education materials, and professionals being more familiar with home dialysis and its impact. Choosing home dialysis is more likely at kidney centers which have better organisational culture, leadership and attitude.

=== United States ===
Since a 1972 law, government insurance (Medicare) covers the cost of dialysis and transplants for citizens of any age with end stage renal disease. By 2014, more than 460,000 Americans were undergoing treatment, the costs of which amount to six percent of the entire Medicare budget. Kidney disease is the ninth leading cause of death, and the U.S. has one of the highest mortality rates for dialysis care in the industrialized world. The rate of patients getting kidney transplants has been lower than expected. These outcomes have been blamed on a new for-profit dialysis industry responding to government payment policies. A 1999 study concluded that "patients treated in for-profit dialysis facilities have higher mortality rates and are less likely to be placed on the waiting list for a renal transplant than are patients who are treated in not-for-profit facilities", possibly because transplantation removes a constant stream of revenue from the facility. The insurance industry has complained about kickbacks and problematic relationships between charities and providers.

=== China ===
The Government of China provides the funding for dialysis treatment. There is a challenge to reach everyone who needs dialysis treatment because of the unequal distribution of health care resources and dialysis centers. There are 395,121 individuals who receive hemodialysis or peritoneal dialysis in China per year. The percentage of the Chinese population with Chronic Kidney Disease is 10.8%. The Chinese Government is trying to increase the amount of peritoneal dialysis taking place to meet the needs of the nation's individuals with Chronic Kidney Disease.

=== Australia ===
Dialysis is provided without cost to all patients through Medicare, with 75% of all dialysis being administered as haemodialysis to patients three times per week in a dialysis facility. The Northern Territory has the highest incidence rate per population of haemodialysis, with Indigenous Australians having higher rates of Chronic Kidney Disease and lower rates of functional kidney transplants than the broader population. The remote Central Australian town of Alice Springs, despite having a population of approximately 25000, has the largest dialysis unit in the Southern Hemisphere. Many people must move to Alice Springs from remote Indigenous communities to access health services such as haemodialysis, which results in housing shortages, overcrowding, and poor living conditions.

== History ==
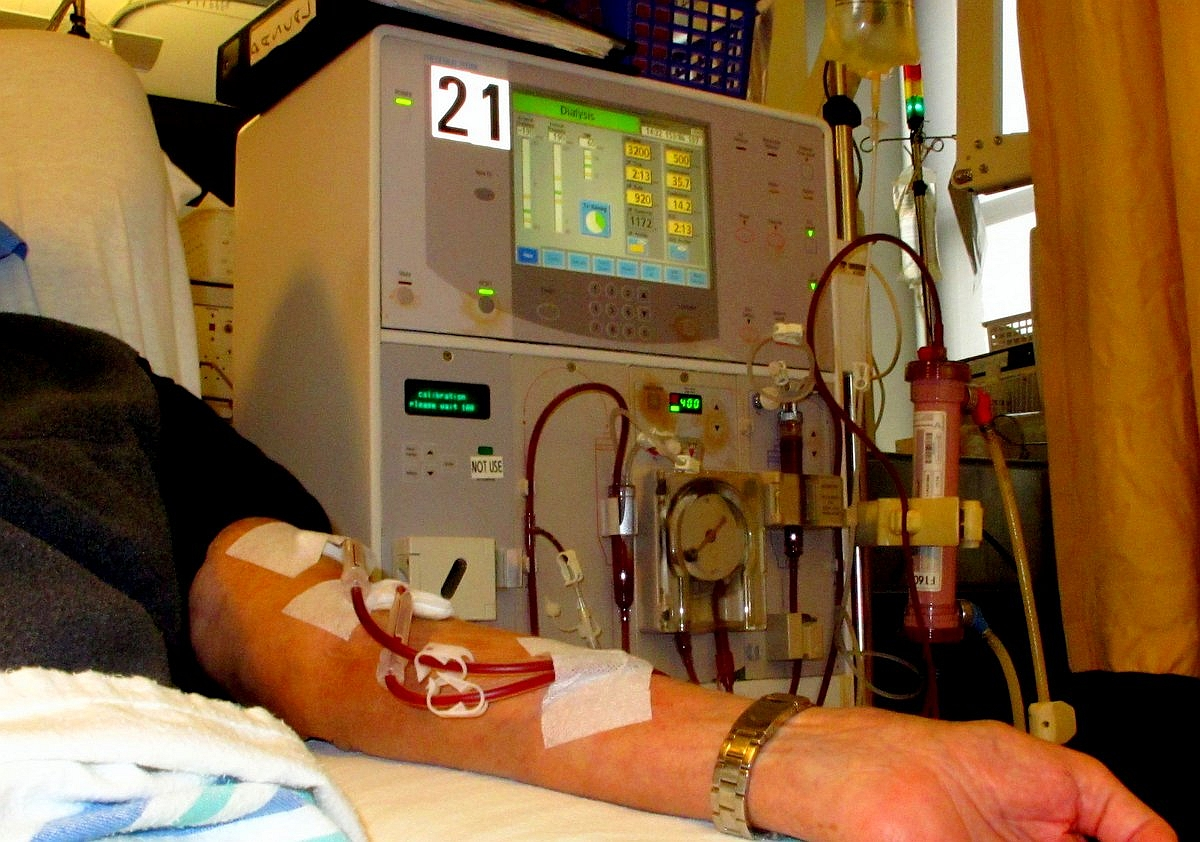
Arm hooked up to dialysis tubing.

In 1913, Leonard Rowntree and John Jacob Abel of Johns Hopkins Hospital developed the first dialysis system which they successfully tested in animals. A Dutch doctor, Willem Johan Kolff, constructed the first working dialyzer in 1943 during the Nazi occupation of the Netherlands. Due to the scarcity of available resources, Kolff had to improvise and build the initial machine using sausage casings, beverage cans, a washing machine and various other items that were available at the time. Over the following two years (1944–1945), Kolff used his machine to treat 16 patients with acute kidney failure, but the results were unsuccessful. Then, in 1945, a 67-year-old comatose woman regained consciousness following 11 hours of hemodialysis with the dialyzer and lived for another seven years before dying from an unrelated condition. She was the first-ever patient successfully treated with dialysis. Gordon Murray of the University of Toronto independently developed a dialysis machine in 1945. Unlike Kolff's rotating drum, Murray's machine used fixed flat plates, more like modern designs. Like Kolff, Murray's initial success was in patients with acute renal failure. Nils Alwall of Lund University in Sweden modified a similar construction to the Kolff dialysis machine by enclosing it inside a stainless steel canister. This allowed the removal of fluids, by applying a negative pressure to the outside canister, thus making it the first truly practical device for hemodialysis. Alwall treated his first patient in acute kidney failure on 3 September 1946.

== See also ==
- Thomas Graham (chemist), the founder of dialysis and father of colloid chemistry
- Dialysis tubing
- List of dialysis providers in the United States
- Vitamin and mineral management for dialysis
- Nephrology
- Hepatorenal syndrome
