= Timeline of Perry County, Tennessee history =

History timeline of Perry County, Tennessee

This article is a timeline of Perry County, Tennessee history.

== 19th century ==
=== 1800s ===
- January 7 1806 – Cherokee cede the land that would later become Perry County to the United States in the Treaty of Washington.

=== 1810s ===
- c.1810-1812 – The first gristmill in the area is established on Cane Creek.
- 1818 – The first known person of European descent in the area that would become Perry County is born.
- 1819 – Perry County is established by the Tennessee General Assembly.

=== 1820s ===
- 1820 – The first court in the county is held in a house on Toms Creek.
- 1821 – The county seat is established in Perryville.
- 1825 – A county militia is formed as the 68th Regiment, 11th Brigade, Tennessee Militia.

=== 1830s ===
- 1830 – The village of Beardstown is established.
- 1832-1834 – The Cedar Grove Iron Furnace is constructed.

=== 1840s ===
- July 10 1843 – The courthouse at Perryville burns.
- November 1845 – Decatur County is formed from the portion of Perry County west of the Tennessee River, the county seat is moved to a village near the new geographic center of the county.
- 1848 – The town of Linden is established as the county seat.

=== 1850s ===
- 1850 – Harper's Statistical Gazetteer reports 10 grist mills, a saw mill, a furnace, two tanneries, 21 churches, and 23 schools enrolling 685 students in the county.
- 1854 – Lobelville is established.
- Spring 1856 – Between 10 and 15 enslaved Black people are murdered by vigilantes following allegations of the plotting of a slave revolt.

=== 1860s ===
- June 1861 – Perry County votes in favor of secession.
- February 1862 February – Cedar Grove Iron Furnace is destroyed by naval gunfire from a flotilla of Union gunboats.
- April 27 1862 – The body of Governor Louis P. Harvey of Wisconsin is found on the banks of the Tennessee River.
- May 12 1863 – Union cavalry forces land on the east bank of the Tennessee River and conduct a raid on Linden, burning the courthouse and capturing Confederate personnel and equipment.
- September 27–30 1864 – Confederate and Union forces skirmish near Lobelville and Beardstown.
- April 1865 – Martial law is lifted and civil courts resume following the Civil War.
- 1868 – A new courthouse is constructed in Linden to replace the one destroyed during the war.
- 1869 – Two Black men are removed from the local jail by a mob and lynched.

=== 1870s ===
- 1871 – The Craig Farm is established on Lick Creek.

=== 1880s ===
- 1880-1884 – The first regular newspaper is published in the county.

=== 1890s ===
- 1890 – The first known bank in the county, Linden Bank and Trust, is established.
- 1897 – Thetus W. Sims, a Linden lawyer, is elected to the United States House of Representatives.

== 20th century ==
=== 1900s ===
- 1900 – Bell Telephone Company establishes the first telephone service in the county.
- Summer 1907 – Due to a legislative error, Perry County is briefly left without a county government.
- 1907 – Linden-born professional baseball player Clyde Milan plays his first season with the Washington Senators.

=== 1910s ===
- 1910 – The population of the county peaks at 8,815.
- May 27 1917 – A tornado strikes the county, killing five and injuring 67.

=== 1920s ===
- January 1928 – The courthouse burns while undergoing renovations. A new, larger building is built on the same site that year.

=== 1930s ===
- July 5 1930 – Governor Henry Horton opens the first bridge across the Tennessee River in the county. The bridge, named after Alvin C. York, connects the Nashville-Memphis Highway between Linden and Perryville.
- September 1 1930 – Linden substantially damaged by fire.

=== 1940s ===
- 1941-1944 – Perry County is included in the area covered by the Tennessee Maneuver Area during World War 2, though the extent of training activity in the county is unclear.
- 1944 – Kentucky Dam is completed, impounding Kentucky Lake and inundating small portions of county along the Tennessee River.
- 1949 – The Tennessee Game and Fish Commission begins a whitetail deer reintroduction program in the county.

=== 1950s ===
- 1955 – Linden High School begins a three-year winning streak at the state high school boys' basketball championships.
- 1957 – The movie Natchez Trace is filmed in the county.
- 1958 – Interstate 40 opens, bypassing the county. Larger businesses begin to leave, setting the stage for long term economic stagnation.

=== 1960s ===
- 1962 – Perry County Airport opens near Linden.
- January 1967 – Site studies begin for a new State Park on the banks of the Tennessee River in the county.

=== 1970s ===
- 1971 – An Old Order Mennonite community is established near Lobelville.
- 1979 – Construction begins on Mousetail Landing State Park.

=== 1980s ===
- 1986 – The Alvin C. York Bridge across the Tennessee River is demolished and replaced by a modern structure.

=== 1990s ===
- 1992 – The county is featured in an episode of Unsolved Mysteries examining the case of a man who went missing in the area in 1985.

== 21st century ==
=== 2000s ===
- 2009 – Unemployment figures reach 29%, the second-highest unemployment rate of any county in the United States.

=== 2010s ===
- 2011 – Unemployment lowers to 14% following a subsidized employment program.

=== 2020s ===
- April 2020 – Unemployment peaks again at 24% during the COVID-19 pandemic.
- November 2020 – The county's sole hospital closes.
- May 2026 – The county government and sheriff settles a lawsuit with a Lexington, Tennessee man claiming civil rights violations following a September, 2025 arrest. The man spent over a month in jail after making a social media post which the sheriff alleged was a threat against Perry County High School.
