= Britt's Landing, Tennessee =

Britt's Landing
- Unincorporated community
- Location within the state of Tennessee Britt's Landing (the United States)
- Coordinates: 35°47′14″N 87°58′14″W
- Country: United States
- State: Tennessee
- County: Perry
- Established: 1839
- Inundated by Kentucky Lake: 1944
- Time zone: UTC-6 (Central (CST))
  - Summer (DST): UTC-5 (CDT)

Britt's Landing was an unincorporated community and river port in Perry County, Tennessee. The land occupied by the community was inundated by the impoundment of Kentucky Lake in 1944.

== History ==
The landing was established in 1839 on the east bank of the Tennessee River in the northern part of the county. It had developed into a commercial center by 1844, and a post office was established in 1850. It lasted as an important shipment point until the 1880s, exporting cotton and peanuts and importing finished goods for Beardstown and Lobelville. Fewer than 10 families resided in the village when it was reported that it would be inundated by Kentucky Lake after the completion of the dam in the late 1930s.

On April 27, 1862, the body of Governor Louis P. Harvey of Wisconsin washed ashore at Britt's Landing. Gov. Harvey fell from a riverboat eight days prior while returning to Wisconsin from an inspection of field hospitals near the site of the Battle of Shiloh.
