= David Rhodes =

David Rhodes may refer to:

- David Rhodes (author) (1946–2022), American novelist
- David Rhodes (cricketer) (1847–1937), English-born New Zealand cricketer
- David Rhodes (footballer) (1948–2013), Australian rules footballer
- David Rhodes (educator and athlete) (1951–2005), American educator, athlete and basketball coach
- David Rhodes (canoeist) (born 1975), Australian sprint canoeist
- David Rhodes (media executive) (born 1973), executive chairman, Sky News Group; former president of CBS News
- David Rhodes (guitarist) (born 1956), English guitarist, songwriter, composer and former member of Random Hold
- Rhodes (singer) (born 1988), stagename of David Rhodes, a British musician, singer and songwriter

== See also ==
- David Rhoads (1932–2017), American cyclist
- Dave Rhodes, infamous Usenet spammer
