= Farmer's Valley, Tennessee =

Farmer's Valley
- Unincorporated community
- Location within the state of Tennessee Farmer's Valley (the United States)
- Coordinates: 35°32′5″N 87°49′52″W
- Country: United States
- State: Tennessee
- County: Perry
- Elevation: 522 ft (159 m)
- Time zone: UTC-6 (Central (CST))
  - Summer (DST): UTC-5 (CDT)
- GNIS feature ID: 1284145

Farmer's Valley was an unincorporated community in Perry County, Tennessee. One of the earliest communities in the county, it hosted a post office, stores, and a warehouse. It remained as a recognized town at least as late as 1882. Though it is no longer registered as a populated place, the valley which contained the community retains the name.
