= DePriest Bend, Tennessee =

DePriest Bend
- Unincorporated community
- Location within the state of Tennessee DePriest Bend (the United States)
- Coordinates: 35°44′17″N 87°48′39″W
- Country: United States
- State: Tennessee
- County: Perry
- Elevation: 495 ft (151 m)
- Time zone: UTC-6 (Central (CST))
  - Summer (DST): UTC-5 (CDT)
- GNIS feature ID: 1282239

DePriest Bend (also known as Depriest's Bend) is an unincorporated community in Perry County, Tennessee. It is named after an early settler of the county, Randolph DePriest, who arrived in the area in the early 19th century from Virginia.
