= Dr. Richard Calvin Bromley House =

- U.S. National Register of Historic Places
- Location within Tennessee Location within the United States
- Location: TN 13 near jct. with Slink Shoals Rd., Flatwoods, Tennessee
- Coordinates: 35°28′36″N 87°49′37″W
- Area: 1 acre (0.40 ha)
- Built: 1909
- Architectural style: Queen Anne
- NRHP reference No.: 95001373
- Added to NRHP: November 29, 1995

The Dr. Richard Calvin Bromley House, also known as Hotel Bromley, is a historic house in Flatwoods, Tennessee, U.S..

The house was built in 1909–1911 for Dr. Richard Calvin Bromley, a physician. Bromley was the son of a Confederate veteran and a graduate of the University of Nashville. The house became known as Hotel Bromley because many of Dr. Bromley's friends frequently visited to hunt and fish. Bromley hired two African-American "servants," who lived upstairs. The house was inherited by his daughter, Celia, a graduate of Vanderbilt University, who lived here with her husband, William Allen Moore of Pulaski, Tennessee. The house remained in the Bromley family until 1947.

The house was designed in the Queen Anne architectural style. It has been listed on the National Register of Historic Places since November 29, 1995.
