= Buffalo Ridge (Tennessee) =

Geographic feature in Tennessee

- Location within Tennessee

Highest point
- Elevation: 800 ft (240 m)
- Prominence: 300 ft (91 m)
- Coordinates: 35°40′29″N 87°49′50″W

Naming
- Etymology: The Buffalo River

Geography
- Location: Perry County, Tennessee
- Country: United States
- State: Tennessee

Buffalo Ridge is a ridge in western middle Tennessee, primarily located in Humphreys, Perry, and Wayne Counties. The ridge, which reaches over 800 feet in elevation, is located about a mile west of Linden, at its closet point. Tree Farm Road runs the length of the ridge along the crest of the range.

== Topography ==
It runs north to south, forming the divide between the watersheds of the Buffalo River and Tennessee River. Its numerous valleys create tributaries to the Tennessee River to the west and to the Buffalo River to the east. Towards the Buffalo River, these tributaries include Coon Creek, Brush Creek, Hurricane Creek, Short Creek, and Cane Creek. Cane Creek, the longest of the tributaries has a fertile valley. On the west side, these tributaries, which run about nine miles towards the Tennessee River, include Cedar Creek, Marsh Creek, Cypress Creek, Spring Creek, Lick Creek, Tom's Creek, Roan's Creek, Crooked Creek, and Blue Creek. These creeks are shallow, fast, and flat, with occasional gravel and sand beaches.

== Land resources ==
Iron is the primary extractable resource on the ridge, with exposed iron deposits visible on the west side of the ridge. A red variation of variegated marble is present, but the majority of the ridge is made from sandstone. The abundant presence of black shale caused speculation over the possibility of the presence of oil or coal, but neither have been discovered in the ridge. Due to the vulnerability of the lower valleys to frosts, fruit farming often takes place on the upper crest of Buffalo Ridge.
