= Beardstown, Tennessee =

Unincorporated community in Tennessee, United States

Beardstown
- Unincorporated community
- Location within the state of Tennessee Beardstown (the United States)
- Coordinates: 35°42′44″N 87°47′57″W
- Country: United States
- State: Tennessee
- County: Perry
- Elevation: 512 ft (156 m)
- Time zone: UTC-6 (Central (CST))
  - Summer (DST): UTC-5 (CDT)
- GNIS feature ID: 1276650

Beardstown is an unincorporated community located entirely within the city limits of Lobelville, Tennessee.

== History ==
Beardstown was formerly host to an elementary school, post office, and a store. The school was established in 1900, originally housed in a white frame building that was replaced by a modern brick structure with school rooms and a combined gymnasium and cafeteria in 1946. The school closed in 1988 with the consolidation of public schools in Perry County as one of the last one or two teacher community schools left in the state.

In 1864, a skirmish known as the Battle of Beardstown was fought partly in an area currently occupied by a golf course in Beardstown between Confederate and Union forces during the American Civil War.

The 1876 edition of R. L. Polk and Co.'s Tennessee State Gazetteer reported Beardstown as the second largest settlement in Perry County, after Linden. At the time, it had a population of about 100 inhabitants, and was home to three grocers, three blacksmiths, a carpenter's shop, a general store, and a hotel.

== Notable individuals ==
- Obediah Pickard - Musician
