= Pope, Tennessee =

Pope
- Unincorporated community
- Location within the state of Tennessee Pope (the United States)
- Coordinates: 35°37′7″N 87°59′22″W
- Country: United States
- State: Tennessee
- County: Perry
- Elevation: 394 ft (120 m)
- Time zone: UTC-6 (Central (CST))
  - Summer (DST): UTC-5 (CDT)
- GNIS feature ID: 1298162

Pope is an unincorporated community in Perry County, Tennessee. The community hosts a volunteer fire department. In 1903, the Mousetail Landing Post Office was closed and relocated to Pope. In the 1950s, a small public school was in operation in the community, though by 1999 the building had fallen into disuse and disrepair. Pope is the location of Starbuck Cemetery and Howard’s Chapel.
