= Kelsie B. Harder =

American onomastician (1922–2007)

Kelsie Brown Harder
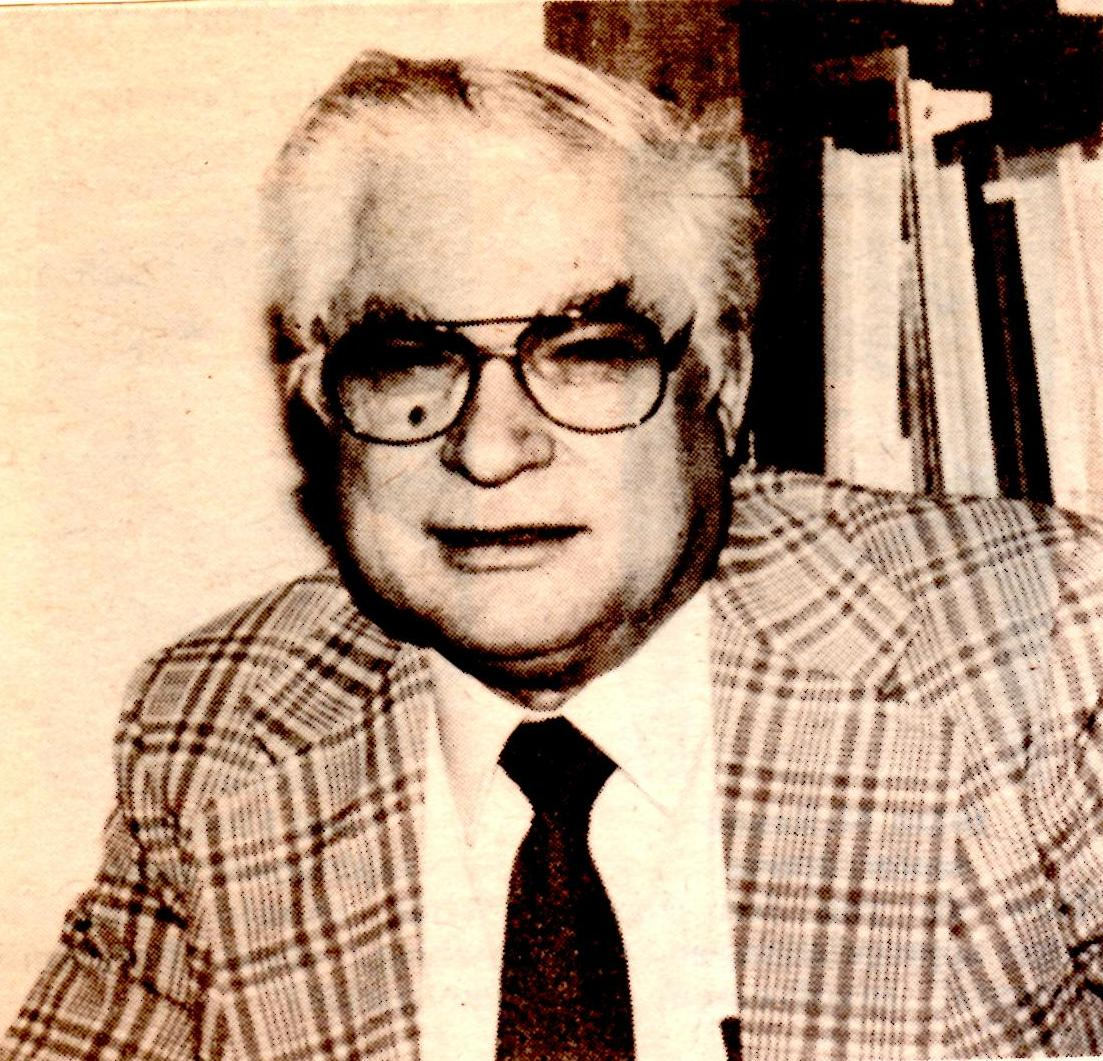
- Harder in 1984
- Born: August 23, 1922; Pope, Tennessee
- Died: April 9, 2007 (aged 84); Potsdam, New York
- Education: Vanderbilt University; University of Florida
- Known for: Place Names of Franklin County, NY: Their origins and History. With Carol Payment Poole. Brushton, NY: TEACH Services, Inc., 2008
- Scientific career
- Fields: Onomastician
- Workplaces: Youngstown State University; SUNY Potsdam

Kelsie Brown Harder (August 23, 1922 – April 9, 2007) was an American professor and onomastician.

== Biography ==
Harder was born in Perry County, Tennessee. After serving in the United States Army after World War II, he earned a bachelor's degree and master's degree in English from Vanderbilt University, then a Ph.D. from University of Florida. Starting his career at Youngstown State University, he joined SUNY Potsdam in 1964. During his long career at SUNY Potsdam he nurtured the talents of younger writers, "in particular the novelist T. Coreghessan Boyle and poet Allen Hoey."

He headed the American Name Society and edited their publication. He also headed the usage committee of the American Dialect Society. He served as director of the Place Name Survey of the United States, and in 1990 gave the keynote address at the Library of Congress on the 100th anniversary of the United States Board on Geographic Names.

Harder died of congestive heart failure in Potsdam, New York.

== Publications ==
- John Crowe Ransom as Poet, Economist and Critic (1950)
- Style and Meaning in the Works of Sir Thomas Urquhart (1954)
- Charles Dickens Names His Characters (1959)
- International Dictionary of Place Names: United States and Canada (1976)
- Names and Their Varieties: A Collection of Essays in Onomastics (1986)
- A Dictionary of American Proverbs (with Wolfgang Mieder and Stewart Kingsbury, 1991)
- Claims to Name: Toponyms of St. Lawrence County (with Mary H. Smallman, 1993)
- Names of Franklin County, New York (with Carol Payment Poole, 2008)
