= Flat Woods, Tennessee =

Flat Woods
- Unincorporated community
- Location within the state of Tennessee Flat Woods (the United States)
- Coordinates: 35°28′37″N 87°49′39″W
- Country: United States
- State: Tennessee
- County: Perry
- Elevation: 676 ft (206 m)
- Time zone: UTC-6 (Central (CST))
  - Summer (DST): UTC-5 (CDT)
- GNIS feature ID: 1284430

Flat Woods (also Flatwoods or Flatwoods Junction, formerly Whitaker's Bluff) is an unincorporated community in Perry County, Tennessee, United States. Originally known as Whitaker's Bluff, the name was changed to Flatwoods in 1871. It lies along State Route 13 south of the town of Linden, the county seat of Perry County. Its elevation is 676 feet (206 m).

The Dr. Richard Calvin Bromley House or Bromley Hotel in Flat Woods is listed on the National Register of Historic Places. Built between 1909 and 1911, it housed the residence and medical office of Dr. Richard Bromley, and was later enlarged to provide accommodations for hunters and other travelers.

In 1957, filming for the movie Natchez Trace took place in Flat Woods. The film was a fictional account of the life of John Murrell, a bandit and slave trader who operated in the region in the early 1800s, and is now believed lost.
