= Andrew H. Wiggs =

American politician (1877–1956)

Andrew Houston Wiggs

Member of the Tennessee Senate from the 20th district
- In office 1927–1929
- Preceded by: David D. Humphreys Sr.
- Succeeded by: Carlton A. Kennedy

Member of the Tennessee House of Representatives from the Perry and Humphreys Floterial District
- In office 1909–1917

Personal details
- Born: 1877 Humphreys County, Tennessee, US
- Died: March 4, 1956 Palmetto, Florida, US
- Party: Democratic Party (United States)
- Spouse: Gussie Ledbetter
- Education: Cumberland University
- Profession: Politician, judge, attorney, newspaper publisher

Andrew Houston Wiggs (1877–1956) was an American politician, judge, attorney, and newspaper publisher.

Wiggs was a member of the Tennessee State Senate representing Tennessee's 20th Senate district, composed of Lewis County, Maury County, and Perry County from 1927 to 1929. Prior to his term in the senate, he represented a floterial district for Perry and Humphreys counties in the Tennessee State House of Representatives from 1909 to 1917. In addition to his work in politics and law, Wiggs founded the weekly newspaper The Perry Countian in 1924 and operated it until 1930. Wiggs died in 1956 at the age of 78 while on an extended visit to Florida.
