= Lady's Bluff Small Wild Area =

Nature preserve in the United States

- Interactive map of Lady's Bluff Small Wild Area
- Type: TVA Small Wild Area
- Location: Linden, TN
- Coordinates: 35.688261°N 88.012921°W
- Operator: Tennessee Valley Authority
- Status: open year round
- Website: https://www.tva.com/environment/recreation/small-wild-areas

Lady's Bluff Small Wild Area (also known as Ladyfinger Bluff Small Wild Area) is a small public access nature preserve managed by the Tennessee Valley Authority located along the Tennessee River in Perry County, Tennessee. The preserve is home to numerous native plant and wildlife species, and is noted for the large number of old-growth cedar trees and limestone outcrops in the area. A 2.6 mile trail leads from a parking area to an overlook atop a high bluff on the river and is designated a National Recreation Trail.
