= Alexander Cave (cavern) =

Cave in Tennessee, United States

- Location within Tennessee
- Location: Lobelville, Tennessee
- Coordinates: 35°50′N 87°43′W
- Depth: Unknown
- Length: Unknown
- Entrances: 1
- Visitors: Closed to the public

Alexander Cave is a cave located in Perry County, Tennessee, near the Duck River. Prior to European settlement, the cave was likely used for shelter by Native Americans as evidenced by mussel shells and worked stone tools found near its entrance. In 2005, the land surrounding the cave was purchased by a Florida businessman and donated to The Nature Conservancy for preservation and protection due to its importance as a roosting location for gray bats.
