= James Dickson House =

- U.S. National Register of Historic Places
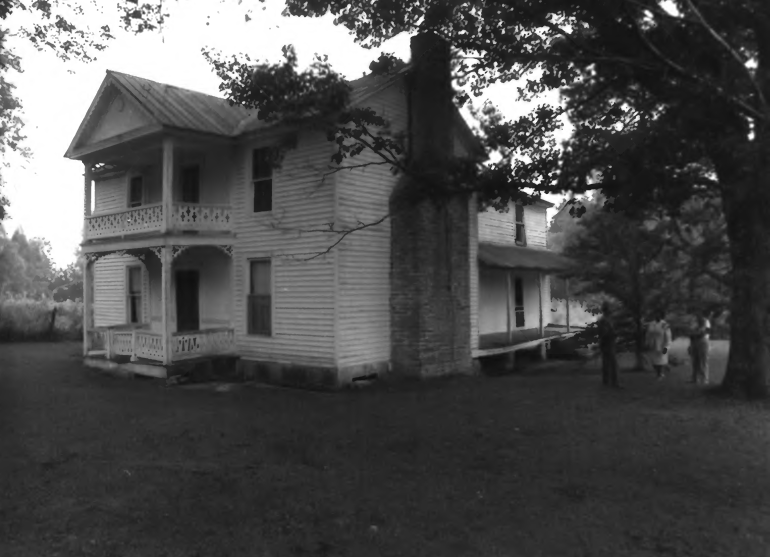

- Location within Tennessee Location within the United States
- Nearest city: Linden, Tennessee
- Coordinates: 35°41′20″N 87°57′37″W
- Area: 4 acres (1.6 ha)
- Built: c. 1819
- Built by: James Dickson
- NRHP reference No.: 85000668
- Added to NRHP: March 28, 1985

The James Dickson House, also known as the Sparks House, is a historic house in Perry County, Tennessee near Linden. It is an example of the "Middle Tennessee I-House," a regional variation on a vernacular architecture style of central passage house with a portico.

== History ==
The house was built c. 1819, possibly earlier, making it "one of the oldest houses in the county." Dickson was a magistrate for Perry County.

In the postbellum era, the house belonged to the Ledbetter family. When their daughter Minerva married Jessie Sparks, it became associated with the Sparks political family: J. Kent Sparks, their son, served in the Tennessee General Assembly.

The house has been listed on the National Register of Historic Places since March 28, 1985.
