= Cedar Grove Iron Furnace =

- U.S. National Register of Historic Places
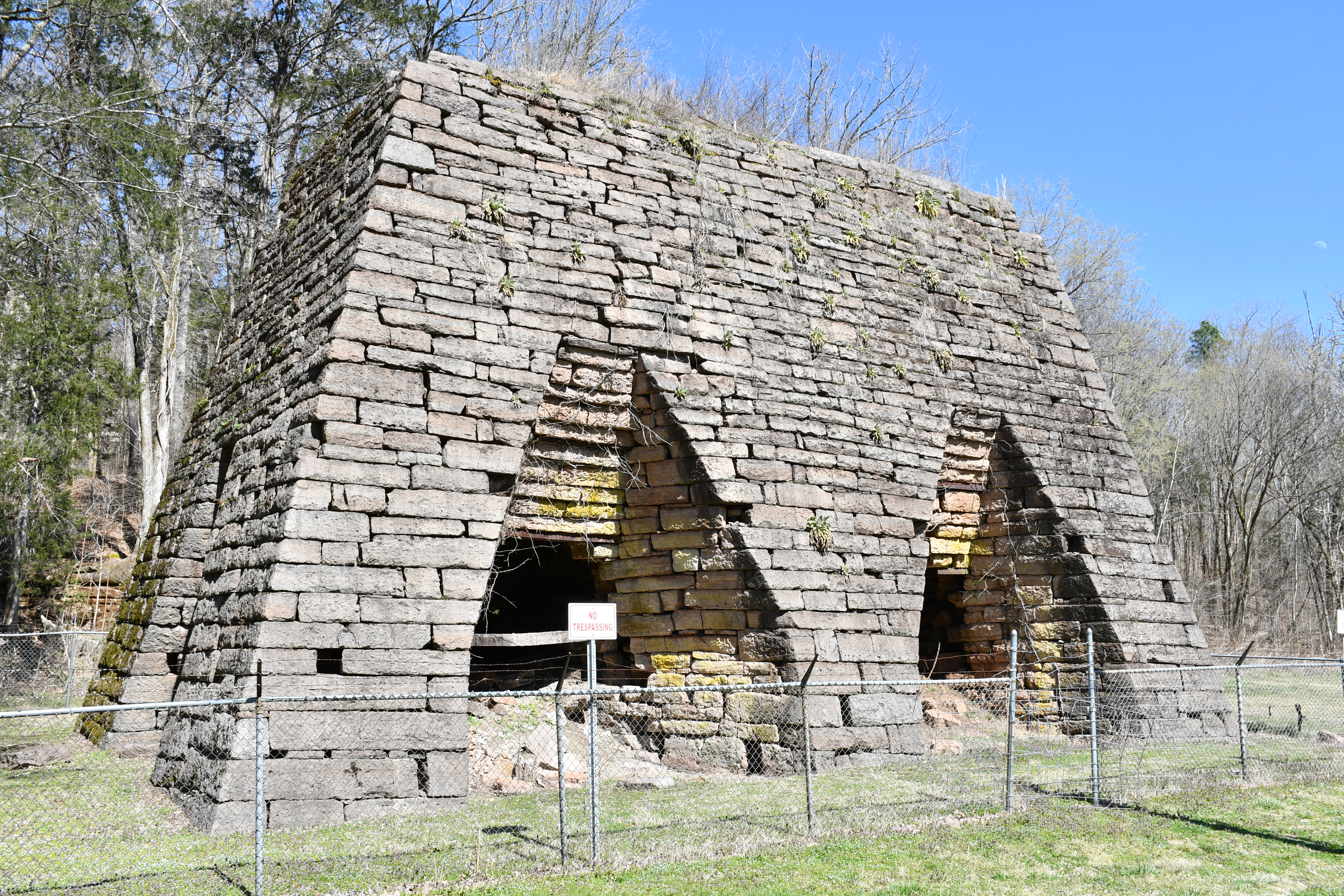

- Location within Tennessee Location within the United States
- Location: Buckfork Road, Linden, TN
- Coordinates: 35°33′29″N 87°57′40″W
- Built: 1832-1834
- Architect: Wallace Dixon
- NRHP reference No.: 73001814
- Added to NRHP: 19 June, 1973

Cedar Grove Iron Furnace is a disused 19th century double-stack iron ore furnace located in Perry County, Tennessee. Sources differ on its construction date, but it was probably built between 1832 and 1834 near the mouth of Cedar Creek on the Tennessee River by William Dixon.

The furnace was one of the earliest steam-powered industrial sites in the region, a fact especially notable considering its isolation from any major population center. It utilized hot blast Scottish smelting techniques that had only recently been developed, and was able to produce over 1,400 tons of pig iron annually. The furnace operated until February, 1862 when it was shelled by Union gunboats USS Conestoga, USS Tyler, and USS Lexington.

Cedar Grove Iron Furnace is the only remaining double-stack charcoal furnace in Tennessee. It is constructed of local hand-carved limestone, stands 30 feet all, and measures 31 feet by 52 feet at the base. Most of the iron ore processed by the furnace was mined nearby in the area of Marsh Creek and was transported by mule-drawn carts for processing at the furnace. Smelted pig-iron would then be loaded onto river boats at the nearby landing on the Tennessee River. Production at the site ended around 1862.
