= James Tucker Airport =

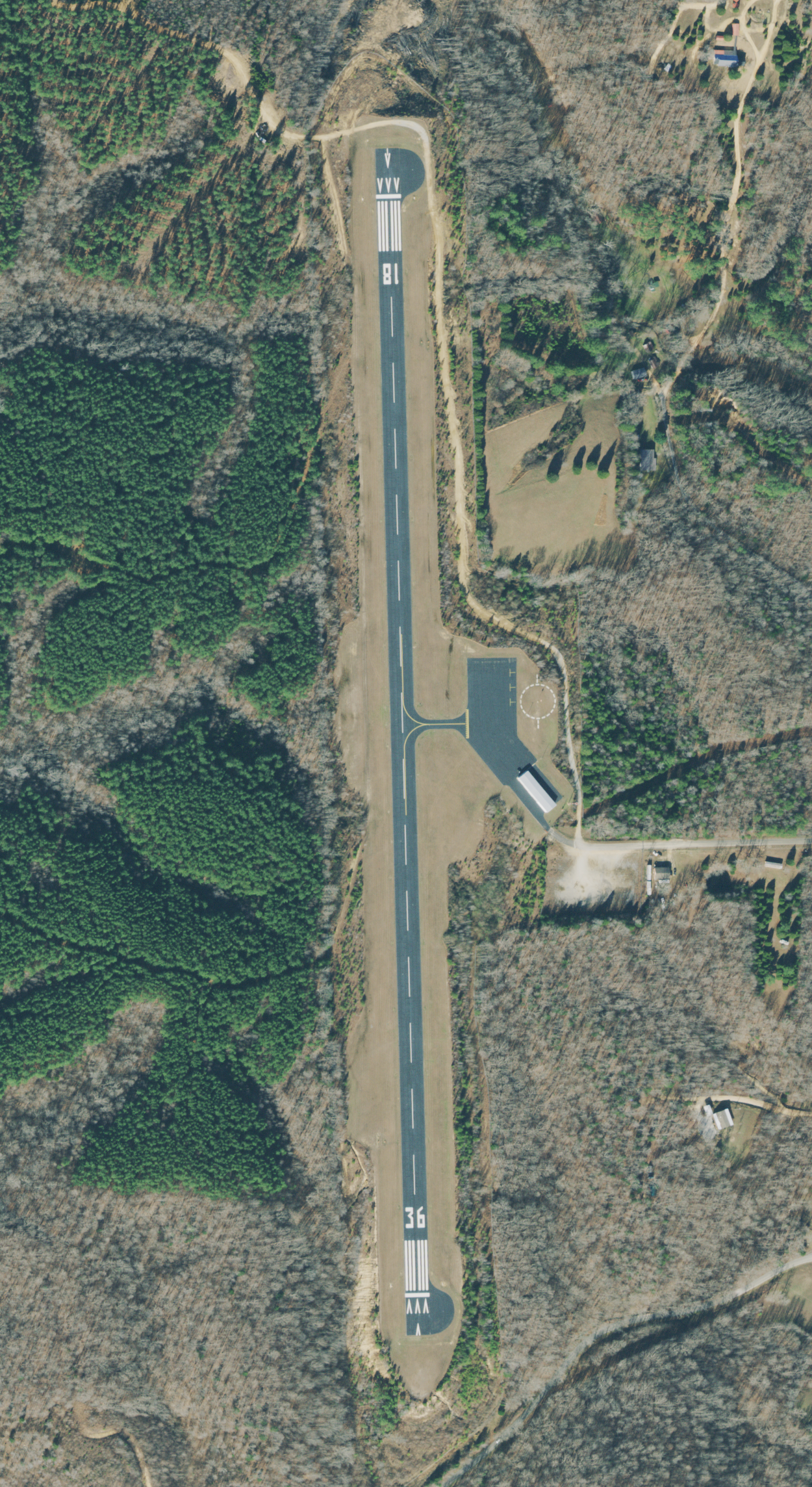
- IATA: none; ICAO: none; FAA LID: M15

Summary
- Airport type: Public
- Owner: Perry County Government
- Operator: Perry County Government
- Serves: Linden, Lobelville
- Location: Linden, Tennessee
- Elevation AMSL: 740 ft (230 m)
- Coordinates: 35°35′45″N 087°52′36″W

Map
- Location within Tennessee Location within the United States

Runways
Direction	Length		Surface
Direction	ft	m	Surface
18/36	3,600	1,097	Asphalt
- Source: Federal Aviation Administration

James Tucker Airport (FAA LID: M15) (also known as James Tucker Perry County Airport) is a county-owned, public-use airport located three nautical miles (6 km) southwest of the central business district of Linden, a town in Perry County, Tennessee, United States. The airport is located on the Atlanta and Memphis sectional charts. Construction of the airport was completed in 1962 t a cost of $218,482. Originally known as Perry County Airport, it was renamed in honor of a local citizen in 2016. Efforts to bring an airport to Perry County date back to 1946. A group of students from a local high school petitioned the county to construct a public airport after having been introduced to aviation through the donation of a Link Trainer to the school. An annual air show was held at the airport in the 1960s.

James Tucker Airport is categorized a nonprimary basic airport in the National Plan of Integrated Airport Systems, and is unclassified in the FAA's General Aviation Airport asset role system (the only airport in Tennessee listed as unclassified).

== Facilities and aircraft ==
James Tucker Airport covers an area of 65 acres (26 ha) and is situated at an elevation of 740 feet (230 metres) above mean sea level. It has one runway designated 18/36 with a 3,600 by 75 ft (1,097 by 23 m) asphalt surface.

The airport is unattended and does not have fuel services. It is included under the Jackson FSS. It has a beacon that is operational from sunset to sunrise, pilot controlled runway lighting, and 2-light Precision Approach Path Indicators on both runways. NOTAMs are filed with Jackson Regional Airport.

== See also ==
- List of airports in Tennessee
