= The Pickard Family =

American folk and country music group

- Origin: Nashville, Tennessee
- Genres: Folk, country
- Years active: 1925-1950s
- Past members: Obediah "Dad" Pickard; Leila May "Mother" Pickard (née Wilson); Obed "Bubb" Pickard, Junior; Ruth Carmen Pickard; James Phaney "Charlie" Pickard; Margaret Ann "Little Annie" Pickard

The Pickard Family was an early American folk and country music group credited with helping popularize country and folk music with urban audiences in the first half of the 20th century. The group was originally successful on so-called "barn dance" shows like the Grand Ole Opry, but eventually expanded to recording, touring, performing on nationally syndicated radio programs, hosting a television show, and appearing in films.

== Career ==
=== Origins ===
Obediah Pickard, also known as Obed or Dad, began singing in local churches near his home in Perry County, Tennessee. He expanded his career to include gatherings in other parts of western Middle Tennessee, near Ashland City and Waverly. During the Spanish-American War, Obed Pickard served as a musician with the First Tennessee Volunteer Infantry Regiment, reportedly performing for Admiral George Dewey. Around 1925 he was discovered by George D. Hay, one of the producers of Barn Dance, a country and folk music radio show broadcast on the Nashville-based WSM radio that would later be known as the Grand Ole Opry. Initially he performed as a one-man-band, but soon afterwards he expanded his routine by bringing in the rest of his family.

=== National prominence ===
The Pickard Family first received national attention soon after their appearance on WSM. Around 1928, following auditions in Detroit, NBC contracted the family for their own show, The Cabin Door. Through the 1930s the group toured around North America, performing on radio shows and syndicated broadcasts across the country. The Pickard Family obtained some notoriety in the 1930s for their appearances on border blaster stations originating near Del Rio, Texas, hosting morning radio shows that garnered revenue through advertising patent medicines.

In the 1940s, the Pickard Family had established themselves in Los Angeles, California. They continued to record, and by the late 1940s hosted a musical television program. In addition to broadcast and recording media, they also began to make their way into the film industry, appearing in at least two movies, Rawhide Rangers and Spade Cooley and his Orchestra.

Obed Pickard died in 1954 in Los Angeles. The group continued to perform professionally, recording singles until the end of the decade. Their last known album, The Pickard Family Sings Hits of Yesterday was released by Verve Records in 1958.

== Influence ==
The group is credited with helping popularize country and Appalachian folk music to a wider audience in the late 1920s and 1930s, especially in more urban areas of the United States outside of the south. Country music singer Ellen Muriel Deason derived her stage name, Kitty Wells, from The Pickard Family's folk ballad "Sweet Kitty Wells."
