= David Rhodes (cricketer) =

New Zealand cricketer

David Kirk Rhodes (20 June 1847 – 22 December 1937) was an English-born cricketer who played in New Zealand for Otago during the 1874–75 season.

Rhodes was born at Huddersfield in Yorkshire in 1847, the second son of John Turner, a woollen manufacturer in the town. He was educated at Huddersfield College and worked for his father before emigrating to Dunedin in New Zealand in 1872 where he established a wool merchants business.

Rhodes played club cricket for Dunedin Cricket Club, where he was the Secretary for some time. He made a single first-class cricket appearance, playing for Otago against Canterbury in a January 1875 match at the Hagley Oval. He recorded a duck in his first innings and scored one not out in his second. As well as cricket, Rhodes had an "excellent reputation" as a hurdle racer who was an experienced athlete. He also played representative rugby union for Otago.

In 1875 Rhodes joined the New Zealand Railways Department and worked as a stationmaster, a post which also involved acting as the postmaster. He worked at Herbert before moving to take up post at Waikouaiti in 1882. He had also been in partnership with his brother as an importer of woollen goods; the partnership was dissolved in 1885. He was married and had seven children when, in 1887, he was charged with embezzling a sum of around £130 from the post office accounts. He pleaded guilty and was sentenced to three years in prison.

In 1891 Rhodes joined the Tasmanian Government Railways where he was appointed as a stationmaster after a few months. From 1894 he worked for the Mount Lyell Mining and Railway Company and by 1897 he was living at Queenstown in Tasmania. He died at Caulfield in Victoria in 1937. He was aged 90.
