= David Rhodes (educator and athlete) =

American educator and athlete

David R. Rhodes
Personal information
- Born: June 4, 1951 Lobelville, Tennessee, USA
- Died: November 10, 2005 (aged 54) Lobelville, Tennessee, USA
- Listed height: 6 ft 1 in (1.85 m)
- Listed weight: 175 lb (79 kg)

Career information
- High school: Perry County (TN)
- College: Ole Miss
- Playing career: 1969–1973
- Position: Guard
- Number: 23
- Coaching career: 1975–1988

David R. Rhodes (June 4, 1951 - November 10, 2005) was an American educator, collegiate athlete, and basketball coach. As a junior playing for Perry County High School, Rhodes was recognized by the Nashville Tennessean sportswriters as a part of the 1967-1968 All-Midstate team, the only junior to appear on the list. In his senior year, he scored a total of 969 points in the 1968-1969 season, averaging 28.5 points per game. This placed him as the fourth leading scorer in Tennessee that year, and he was named to the Associated Press, United Press International, and All-State teams. He ended his high school career with a total of 2,417 points, a 21.5 point per game average.

In March 1969 he signed with Ole Miss under coach Cob Jarvis. In 1972, he ended the season as starting guard, leading the SEC in free throw percentage. That season he set the Ole Miss free throw percentage record with 87.7 percent, a record he surpassed the next year with a 90.1 percent average. His record stood until the 2010-2011 season when it was surpassed by Chris Warren.

Upon graduation, Rhodes returned to Perry County, Tennessee, where he served as coach for Perry County High School boys and girls basketball teams from 1974 to 1988. During this time, the boys team won the State Championship twice, in 1976 and 1977. In 1988, he was named Superintendent of Perry County Schools, holding this position until his death in 2005 at the age of 54. In 2006, Rhodes was posthumously inducted into the Tennessee Secondary School Athletic Association Hall of Fame.
