= Alvin C. York Bridge =

Pedestrian bridge that crosses the Ohio River at Louisville, Kentucky

- Coordinates: 35°37′38″N 88°01′56″W
- Carries: U.S. Route 412
- Crosses: Tennessee River
- Locale: Perry County, Tennessee, and Decatur County, Tennessee, United States

Characteristics
- Longest span: 440 ft (130 m)

History
- Opened: 1986

The Alvin C. York Bridge is a continuous box girder bridge that carries U.S. Route 412 across the Tennessee River, connecting Perry County, Tennessee, and Decatur County, Tennessee. It was completed in 1986 to replace an earlier through truss bridge of the same name built in 1930. The largest single span is 440 feet (130 m).
