= Perry County, Tennessee =

Administrative region of the U.S.

- County
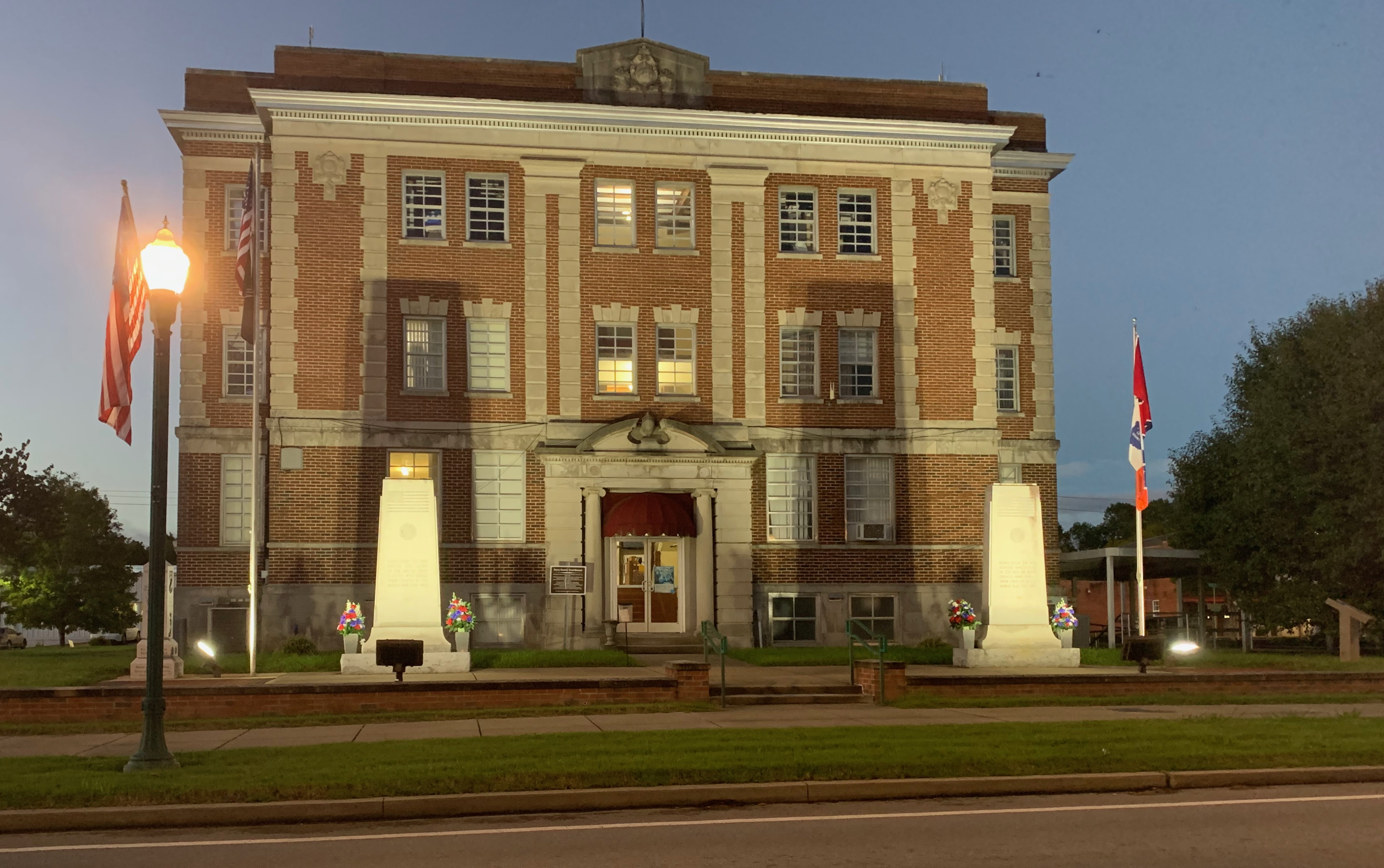
- Perry County Courthouse in Linden

- Location within the U.S. state of Tennessee
- Coordinates: 35°38′N 87°52′W
- Country: United States
- State: Tennessee
- Founded: November 14, 1819
- Named for: Oliver Hazard Perry
- Seat: Linden
- Largest town: Linden
- Other cities: Lobelville

Government
  - County mayor: John Carroll

Area
  - Total: 423 sq mi (1,100 km^{2})
  - Land: 415 sq mi (1,070 km^{2})
  - Water: 8.1 sq mi (21 km^{2}) 1.9%

Population (2020)
  - Total: 8,366
  - Estimate (2025): 9,126 ▲
  - Density: 20.2/sq mi (7.8/km^{2})
- Demonym: Perry Countian
- Time zone: UTC−6 (Central)
  - Summer (DST): UTC−5 (CDT)
- ZIP Codes: 37097, 37096
- Area code: 931
- Congressional district: 7th
- Website: www.perrycountytn.com

Perry County is a county located in the U.S. state of Tennessee. As of the 2020 census, the population was 8,366, with an average population density of 20.2 persons per square mile (7.8 persons/km^{2}), making it the least densely populated county in Tennessee. Its county seat and largest town is Linden. The county is named after American naval commander and War of 1812 hero Oliver Hazard Perry.

In 1806, the Cherokee ceded to the United States the land that would later become Perry County in the Treaty of Washington. The county was established by the Tennessee General Assembly in 1819 from parts of Wayne County, Hickman County, and Humphreys County. In 1845, the portions of Perry County located west of the Tennessee River were split off to form Decatur County.

Agriculture and forestry are the largest components of the local economy, supplemented by light industry and tourism. Perry County is one of the most economically disadvantaged counties in the state. It was severely impacted by the Great Recession of 2008, at one point having the second highest unemployment rate in the United States, and as of 2026 continues to lag behind the rest of the state in various economic indicators, including income inequality and poverty rates. Transportation infrastructure is limited, and no railroads, commercial airports, or freeways are present in the county.

Over 80 percent of the county is forested. The county's terrain is largely defined by its two major rivers, the Buffalo and the Tennessee, and features ridges and valleys that form tributaries to the rivers. Agriculture and outdoor recreation benefit from plentiful fresh water sources, fertile crop land, and abundant wildlife. Mousetail Landing State Park is the largest protected area in the county and a significant driver of nature tourism in the region.

== History ==
=== Prehistory and early settlement ===
Archaeological evidence suggests a significant population of mound building Native Americans in the county, with several mounds located near the Tennessee River at Lady's Bluff. One of the largest mounds in the state was built between 1000 and 1300 CE in the county on Cedar Creek. Though it has been reduced in size due to erosion and agricultural activity, it still measures approximately 20 feet (6.1 m) high and 120 feet (37 m) in circumference. Archaeological surveys conducted in the 1970s and 1980s discovered evidence of early Archaic through late Woodland settlement concentrated in bottomland (low-lying alluvial land) in the Tennessee River basin near Mousetail Landing State Park, with evidence of Paleoindian occupation in one site. More recently, shore erosion associated with increased traffic on the river has exposed burial sites and middens associated with pre-European settlement in the park. Arrowheads and spear tips associated the Mississippian, Woodland, and Copena cultures have been found along the Tennessee River tributaries in the western half of the county. One example of ancient Native American statuary, an 8 inches (20 cm) tall female figure unearthed prior to 1868 near a mound in the county, is in the collection of the Smithsonian Institution.

On January 7, 1806, with the signing of the Treaty of Washington, the Cherokee ceded to the United States a large tract of territory in the south-central portion of Tennessee that included the area that would become Perry County. Permanent settlement by people of European descent along with enslaved people of African descent began shortly after this treaty was ratified. The area was found to have very productive bottomland with an abundance of water, timber, and wild game. The earliest settlers likely arrived from nearby counties in Middle Tennessee, although some immigrated to the area from North Carolina, Alabama, and Kentucky.

Between 1810 and 1812, the first gristmill in the area was established on Cane Creek. The first known birth of a person of European descent in the area occurred in 1818 along Toms Creek. Some of the early settlers were veterans of the War of 1812, and some had probably received land grants in the area from the state of North Carolina for service in the American Revolution. It is likely the first settlers arrived via the Tennessee River based on the location of the first settlements being located near natural river landings.

=== Formation and early history ===
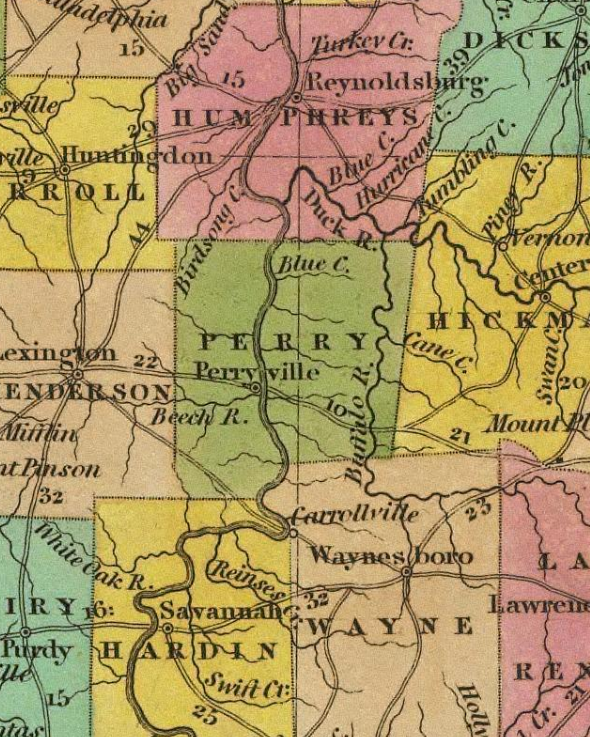
Perry County, as depicted in the 1836 edition of Tanner's New Universal Atlas

In 1819, the Tennessee General Assembly passed an act providing:

... that a new county be established north of Wayne, west of Hickman, and south of Humphreys, by the name of Perry County, beginning at the southeast corner of Humphreys, running west, thence south, thence east, thence north to place of beginning, and to include all the territory lying between Humphreys, Hardin, Wayne and Hickman Counties.

The county, named in honor of Oliver Hazard Perry, was officially organized that same year.

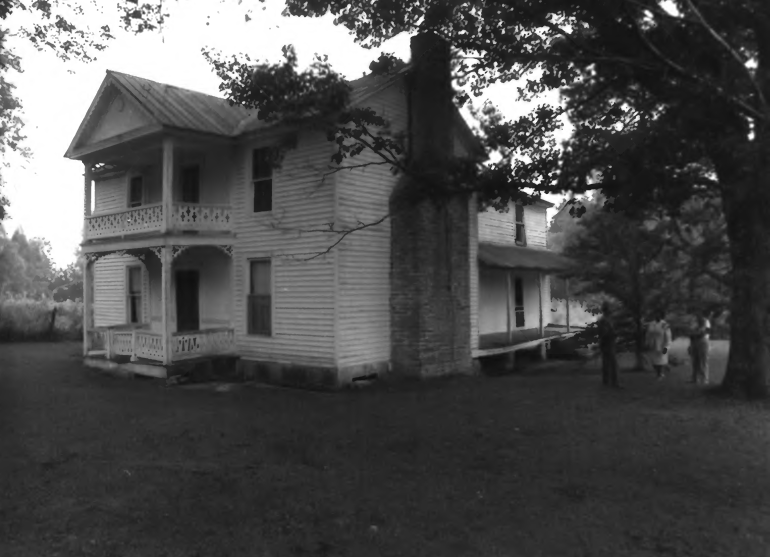
The James Dickson House

In 1820, the first court in the county was held in the home of James Dickson (or Dixon) near Lick Creek under a Judge Humphreys. The county's first school was established by Ferney Stanley on Toms Creek the same year. In 1821, the county seat was established in Perryville, a river port located on the west bank of the Tennessee River and originally known as Midtown. A log courthouse was constructed in Perryville, but was later replaced with a brick structure. Early in its history, Perryville was a relatively important river port and settlement, with some sources noting David Crockett, Andrew Jackson, Sam Houston, and James K. Polk all having visited the town at some point. By 1837, however, the town was reportedly in a ruinous state and described as a "miserable looking settlement" by one traveler, even though it remained the county seat and an active river landing.

In 1825, the county's militia was formalized as the 68th Regiment, 11th Brigade, Tennessee Militia. Later, in 1827, the county militia was split into two regiments by the state legislature, with one regiment drawing from the area east of the Tennessee River, and the other drawing from the west, marking one of the first legal splits of the county along the river. In 1830, the settlement of Beardstown was established on a high bluff overlooking the Buffalo River.

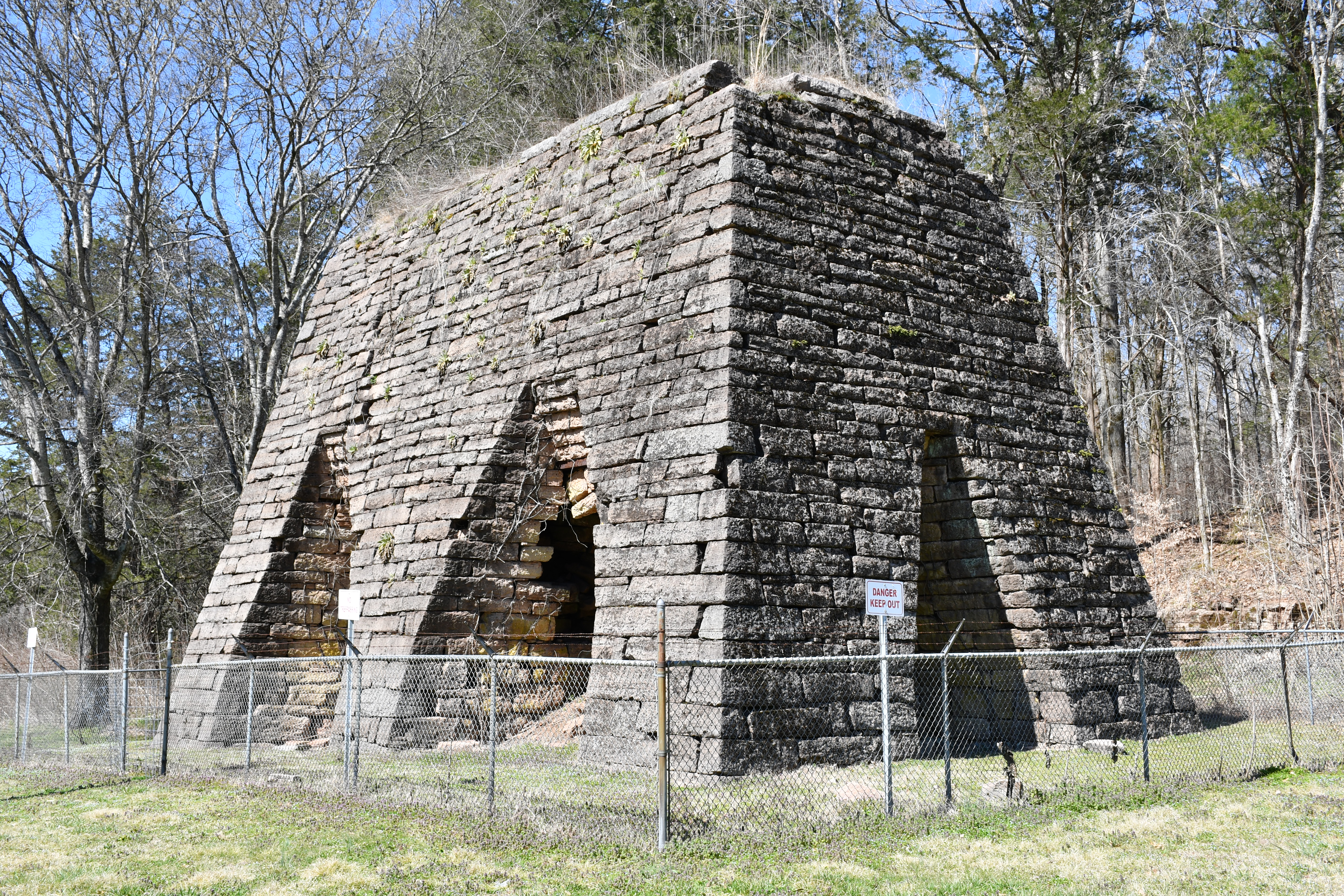
Cedar Grove Iron Furnace

By the early 1830s, significant deposits of iron ore had been discovered in the county. Sufficient quantities were being extracted to justify the construction of a large iron ore furnace on Cedar Creek near the Tennessee River between 1832 and 1834. It was one of the first furnaces in the state, possibly the first, designed for the then-new "hot blast" smelting techniques for refining pig iron. By 1838, a community had grown around the furnace, including mills, barracks for free and enslaved workers, a storehouse, blacksmith shops, and other workshops and outbuildings. The furnace shut down in 1862 during the Civil War after being shelled by Union gunboats, and was never brought back to service. The Cedar Grove Iron Furnace is the only twin-stack iron furnace remaining in Tennessee. In addition to iron ore, some marble mining was conducted in the county in the middle of the 19th century.

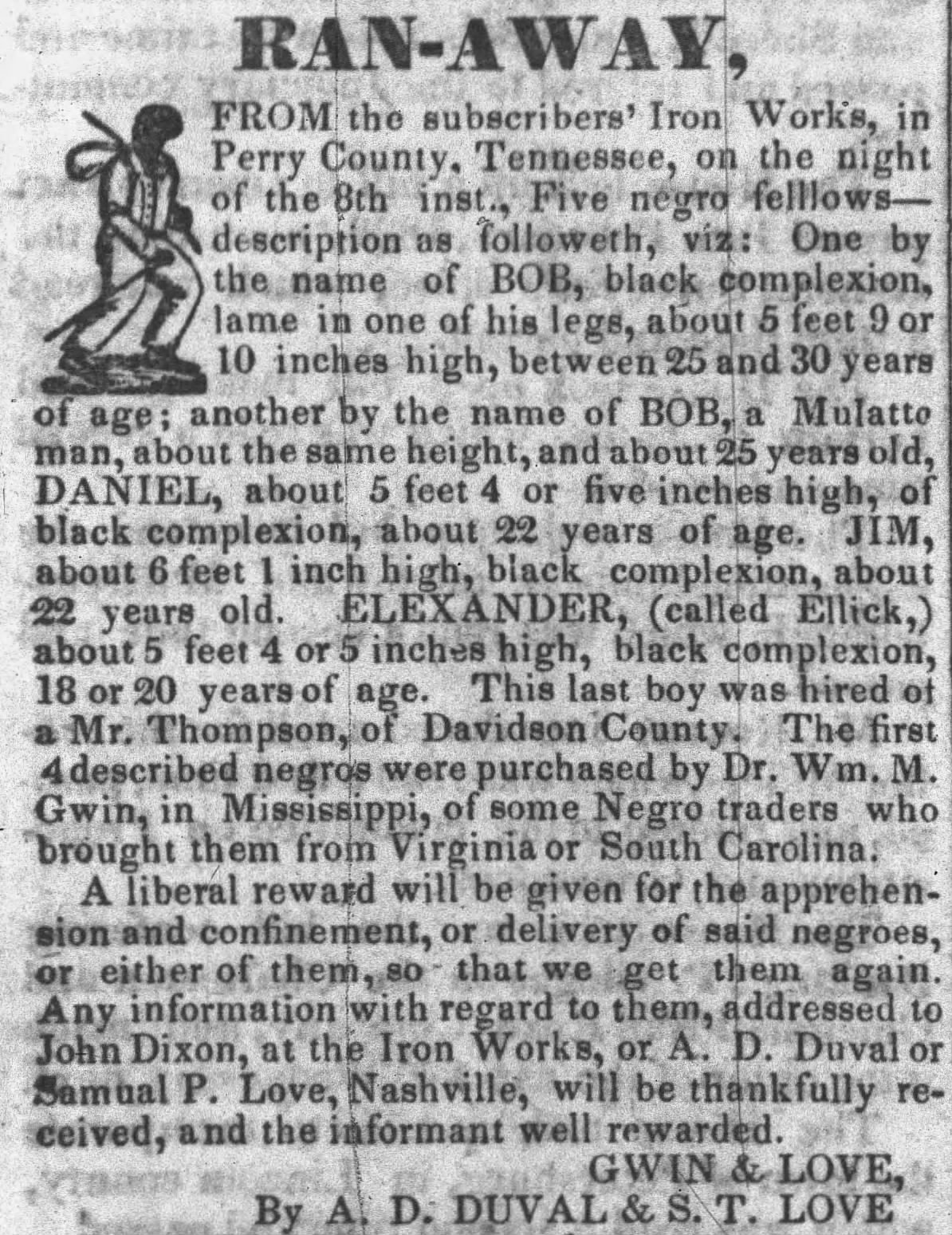
Notice posted in the Nashville Union newspaper of a runaway slave from the iron works

In February 1833, the issue of nullification, or the ability of state governments to unilaterally invalidate federal laws as unconstitutional, was raised in a mass meeting in Perryville. After speakers for and against federal supremacy were heard, a resolution was passed unanimously supporting the right of the president to execute the laws passed by Congress, condemning the acts of nullification in South Carolina, and reaffirming the necessity of the maintenance of the Union. On July 10, 1843, the courthouse at Perryville was destroyed in a fire, and through at least late 1844 meetings that would otherwise have been held in the courthouse were held in warehouses along the river. No record exists of a courthouse being re-built in Perryville. By the late 1830s, the difficulties of conducting government business in a county split by a major river that lacked reliable crossings was becoming more apparent. In 1837, a bill was passed in the state legislature creating an entry-taker's office in the eastern portion of the county, duplicating many of the county government's functions. Demands to separate the portion of the county west of the Tennessee River were increasing by 1845, citing the "danger and expense in attending courts...and other business in the county seat [of Perryville]" by people living on the opposite side. That year, bills proposing the creation of a new county formed by the portions of Perry County west of the river appeared in the state legislature. In November 1845 the legislature passed an act to create Decatur County from the land occupied by Perry County west of the Tennessee River. The seat of government and courts were then temporarily relocated from Perryville to a village near the new geographic center of the county known as Harrisburg.

In 1847, 40 acres (16 hectares) located approximately 3 miles (4.8 km) north of Harrisburg on the west bank of the Buffalo River were donated to the county by David B. Harris for the building of a new county seat. The town was initially named Milton, in honor of Milton Brown, but when it was discovered that there was already a town of the same name in the state, it was renamed Linden after the Thomas Campbell poem "Hohenlinden". The land was divided into plots and a public square, and the plots were sold off to provide funds for the construction of public buildings. Linden was established as the county seat in 1848, where it remains as of 2023, and is the largest municipality in the county. A temporary structure to house the court was built in 1848, and was replaced by a wooden frame building in 1849. Harrisburg no longer exists as an organized entity or recognized location. During this time period, in 1844, the community of Flatwoods, originally known as Whitaker's Bluff, was established along the Buffalo River in the southern part of the county by a group of settlers from Halifax, North Carolina.

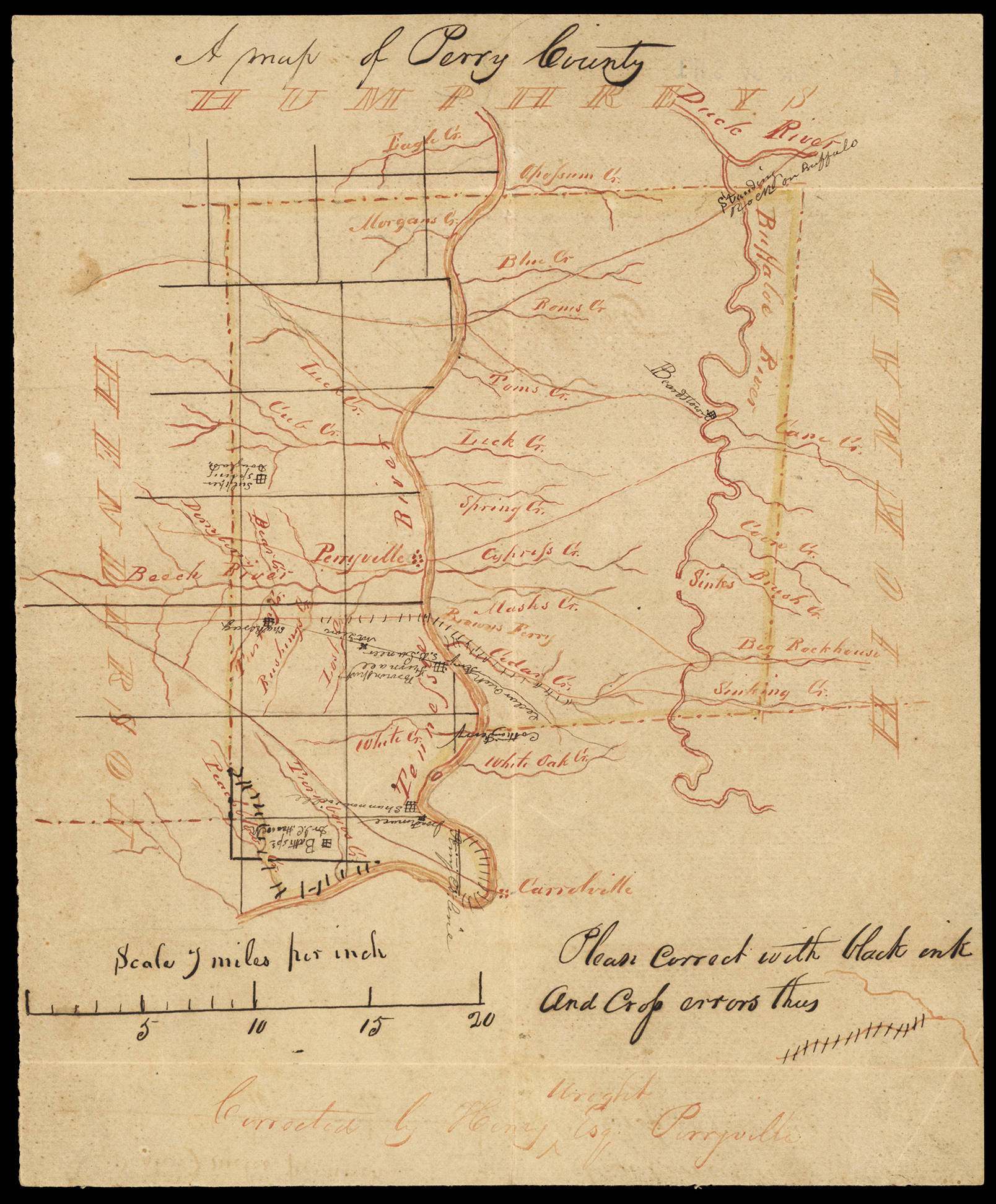
1842 map of Perry County

In 1850, it was reported that there were 10 grist mills, a saw mill, a furnace, and two tanneries in operation within the county. Additionally, 21 churches were organized, as well as 23 schools enrolling 685 students. Corn was the primary agricultural product at the time, though oats, sweet potatoes, and tobacco were also grown in smaller quantities. In 1854, Lobelville was established as a trading-post village on the west bank of the Buffalo River about 5 miles (8.0 km) north of Beardstown by a French trader named Henri de Lobel.

By the late 1850s, allegations and rumors of an impending slave insurrection began to spread throughout the southern United States. In 1856, the panic reached Perry County, when multiple enslaved persons were murdered over rumors of the plotting of a revolt. The total number of people killed by so-called vigilance committees is unclear, with contemporary reports citing as many as 15 being hanged, and later historical research noting between 10 and 12.

=== Civil War ===
As late as May 1861, when a pro-Union convention was held in Linden to nominate a Republican candidate for Congress, it was unclear whether or not the county would support secession. In June 1861, however, it voted in favor of secession by a margin of 780 to 168. Even though the vote was overwhelmingly in favor of secession, pro-Union sentiment was strong and pervasive throughout the war, with men from the county volunteering for both sides in the conflict. Military support for either side in the conflict was more split than the vote would suggest, as approximately 300 men joined the Confederate Army and about 200 joined the Union Army. One particularly notable Confederate unit formed in the county was Harder's Company of the 23rd Tennessee Infantry Regiment, raised in 1861 and composed of about 100 men from the Cedar Creek area. This unit fought throughout the war, including battles at Fort Donelson, Shiloh, Stones River, Chickamagua, and the Siege of Petersburg. The company surrendered with the Army of Northern Virginia in 1865.

Due to the rural, isolated nature of the county, away from the major railway lines and with only limited access to large landings on the Tennessee River, most military activity was limited to raids and guerilla warfare. Both pro-Union and pro-Confederate irregular forces were organized in Perry County conducted raids on neighboring counties. Of note were the Perry County Jayhawkers, a group of Union-aligned partisans engaged in fighting against opposing partisans in Hickman County and who burned the county seat of Centerville.

In February 1862, the Cedar Grove Iron Furnace was partially destroyed when it was shelled by Union gunboats USS Conestoga, USS Tyler, and USS Lexington. On April 27, 1862, the body of Wisconsin governor Louis P. Harvey was found by a group of children playing near Britt's Landing on the Tennessee River. Gov. Harvey had been conducting an inspection of hospitals where wounded soldiers were being treated after the Battle of Shiloh, and had drowned in the river after falling from a boat on April 19 while returning to Wisconsin. In April 1863 the Mississippi Marine Brigade, a Union Army amphibious unit consisting of infantry and a number of gunboats, held at Britt's Landing after fighting further upriver before attempting to pass the shoals at the Duck River confluence.

==== Breckenridge's raid on Linden ====
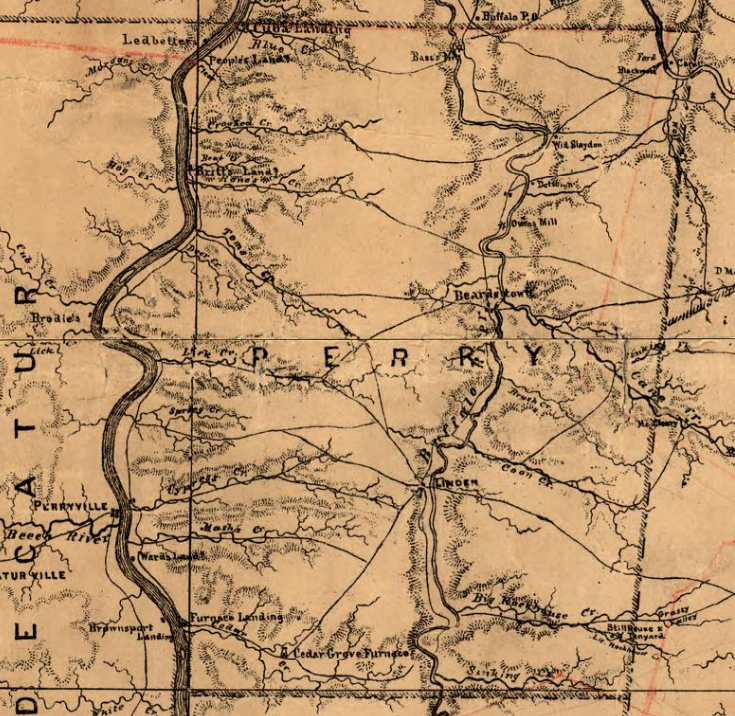
A section of an 1874 reprint of a Union military map of Tennessee depicting Perry County during the American Civil War

Before dawn on May 12, 1863, a flotilla under the command of Lt. Cmdr. Ledyard Phelps composed of the USS Champion, USS Covington, USS Argosy, and the USS Silver Cloud landed elements of the Union Army's 6th Tennessee Cavalry Regiment on the Tennessee River 12 miles (19 km) west of Linden. The small force of 55 men led by Lt. Col. William Breckenridge, possibly a native of either Wayne County or Perry County, approached Linden at daybreak. The Confederate forces, totaling about 100 men under Lt. Col. William Frierson, were preparing to depart Linden to join General Van Dorn's force at Spring Hill and were taken completely by surprise. After a short skirmish against pickets, the Union cavalry captured Lt. Col. Frierson and 46 of his officers and men and killed three more before reinforcements could arrive. During this engagement, the county courthouse, which was being held by the Confederate forces, was burned, destroying most records from the early history of the county. The only Union loss during the engagement was one horse. Breckenridge then returned to the Tennessee River and transferred his prisoners to the awaiting riverboats for transportation to Cairo, Missouri. Intelligence gathered from the Confederates captured in the engagement provided significant details to Union leadership on the size, location, and intentions of Confederate forces in the Middle Tennessee, including plans to re-capture Fort Henry and attack Union forces under General Rosecrans. The amphibious landing and battle was recounted on the front page of the May 17, 1863, edition of the New York Times. Breckenridge later died of disease on October 15, 1863, and was buried at Shiloh National Cemetery.

==== Battles at Lobelville and Beardstown ====
On or about September 23, 1864, a force of about 400 Confederate cavalry under Maj. Gen. Nathan Bedford Forrest crossed the Tennessee River near the mouth of the Duck River and worked their way south through the Buffalo River valley, taking conscripts to reinforce their numbers along the way. On September 27 or 29 (sources differ on the date) elements of the 2nd Tennessee Mounted Infantry numbering about 250 men engaged the Confederates at Lobelville. The Confederate forces retreated south to Beardstown following the brief engagement. Federal forces attempted to locate them the following day, but bypassed Beardstown and crossed the Buffalo River for Cane Creek. The Confederates had their numbers reinforced to 600 men overnight and pursued the Federal forces east towards Centerville. The Federals were able to stage a retreat through Confederate blocking forces and cross the Duck River, leaving the Confederates to take control of Linden and the lower Buffalo River valley by the 30th.

=== Reconstruction and the late 19th century ===
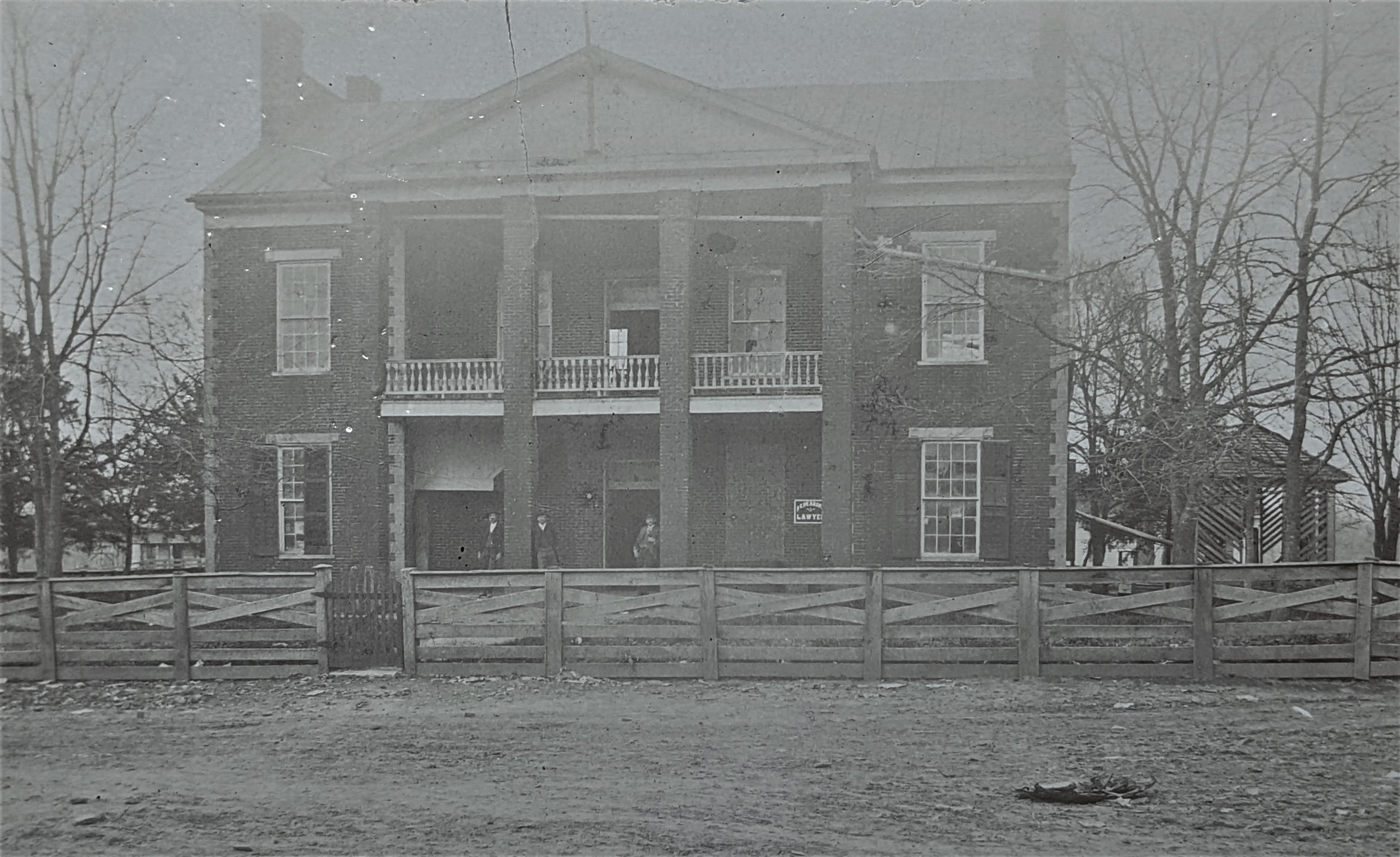
The 1868 courthouse in Linden

Martial law was lifted in the county in April 1865, when the civil court held its first session since Tennessee's secession and the beginning of the Civil War. At least some civil unrest continued until at least July of that year, when Federal forces were again dispatched to the county to conduct counter-guerilla operations. Due to the prevalence of small farms in the county, it did not experience the same levels of economic turmoil in counties that relied on plantation agriculture following the war. In 1868, a new two-story brick courthouse was built to replace the one burned during the war. Perry County was not immune to Reconstruction era racial violence against black citizens. In 1869, the county sheriff attempted to arrest two black men, Thomas Avant and Henry Douglas, for brandishing weapons in Linden. Following a chase by a posse, Avant was captured and jailed while Douglas escaped. Another black man, Elias Thomas, was subsequently arrested as well based on information provided by Avant. The night after their arrest and incarceration a mob of between 15 and 20 men in disguise surrounded the jail in Linden and demanded the two men be turned over. The mob subsequently took the men out of town and shot them. Reportedly, the mob was composed of members of the Ku Klux Klan from outside the county. The lynching was reported in newspapers as far away as Chicago.

In the late 19th century, the county was largely known for its tanneries and peanut cultivation. Peanut farming began in earnest in the late 1860s, replacing cotton as the primary export crop of the county. By 1886 over 500,000 bushels of peanuts per year were being produced. In the 1890s, the Southern Peanut Company was incorporated at Britt's Landing, which became the focal point of the peanut processing industry in the county. The dominance of the peanut as the primary cash crop in the county lasted through to the 1920s when the Southern Peanut Company went bankrupt. With the company's bankruptcy, the lack of processing and export facilities caused the market for peanuts in the county to collapse.

The first known black-owned farm in the county was established in 1871 on the north fork of Lick Creek. Tapp Craig and his wife, Amy Guthrie, both former slaves, purchased the farm with a down payment of a yoke of oxen, and paid off the farm over the next two years. The farm, still owned by the Craig family, is listed in the National Register of Historic Places due to its significance in the history of black farmers in Tennessee.

From about 1880 to 1884, the first regular newspaper in the county, the Linden Times, was published weekly. By the mid-1880s, the continued lack of railroad connections was reported as a cause for the lack of investment in the county. An 1886 editorial in the Nashville Daily American noted that many in the county were awaiting the construction of the proposed Nashville, Memphis, and Jackson Railroad, and viewed it as an essential step in the modernization and industrialization of the area. In 1887, Congress authorized the construction of a railroad bridge across the Tennessee River connecting Perry and Decatur counties. The Tennessee Midland Railroad laid tracks from Lexington, Tennessee to Perryville. While a terminus allowing the transfer of goods from rail to river shipping was constructed in Perryville, the bridge was never built and the railroad was never extended into Perry County. A second attempt to bring a railroad to Perry County was started around 1890 with construction beginning on the Florence Northern Railroad. Plans for the line's extension meant for it to eventually pass through Linden on its way from Florence, Alabama to Paducah, Kentucky. In 1894 the railroad was purchased by a Chattanooga company after about 30 miles (48 km) had been graded, but construction was never completed.

=== Early 20th century ===
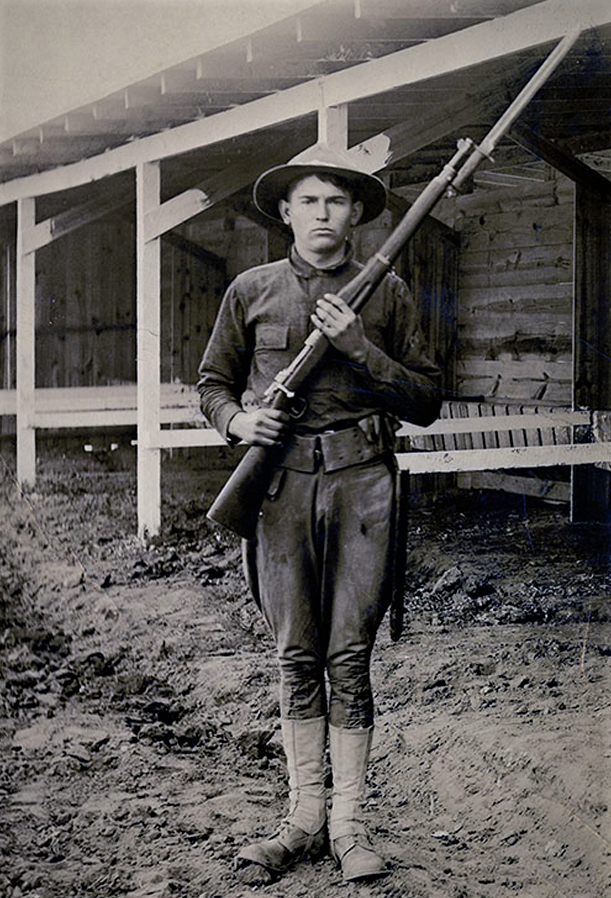
Pvt. Noah Harder of Linden, killed in Belgium, 1918

Briefly, in the summer of 1903, Perry County was without a county government. That year the state legislature passed an act consolidating the civil districts in the county, and providing for a new special election to be held that would elect new officers. Due to an oversight in the writing of the act, the new county officers could not be seated until 30 days after the election.

By 1910, the population of the county peaked at 8,815. It then proceeded to decline to a low of 5,238 individuals in 1970, a number not seen since the census of 1830. During the First World War, a Selective Service Board was established in Linden. Over 1,500 men registered for the draft, and 254 individuals from Perry County served in the United States military from 1917 to 1919. Out of those who served, 10 were wounded and 27 were killed, a nearly 15% casualty rate.

1934 Tennessee Valley Authority map of Perry County

In 1927, the county decided to renovate and expand the courthouse. In January 1928, the building burned as it was undergoing restoration. The county government decided to demolish the remains of the old courthouse and construct a new, larger building in the Colonial Revival style which was completed that same year. Also in 1928, construction started on the first bridge across the Tennessee River in West and Middle Tennessee, connecting Perry and Decatur counties. The bridge, named after World War I Medal of Honor recipient Alvin C. York, was opened on July 5, 1930, by Governor Henry Horton as part of a major road building program to provide additional links between Memphis and Nashville. The crossing would prove to be extremely popular, and was the fourth highest grossing toll bridge in the state in the month after its opening. This bridge was later demolished and replaced by a modern concrete bridge in 1986. The construction of the road bridge and completion of the highway reduced demand for rail service in the area, and service to the rail terminal at Perryville was discontinued in 1936.

By the 1930s, Perry County had acquired a reputation as a hotbed of illicit alcohol production. Its isolated nature on the eastern edge of a Federal law enforcement district meant that prohibition officers rarely operated in the area, allowing moonshine operations to run unimpeded. Liquor would be distributed to dealers in neighboring Hickman County for sale.

During the Second World War, Perry County was located in the Tennessee Maneuver Area, though it is unclear to what extent exercises occurred within Perry County, if at all. The region was chosen due to its geographic similarity with anticipated combat areas in Western Europe, specifically, the region around the Rhine in Germany. Maneuvers began in June 1941 and training was suspended in March 1944 as Operation Overlord approached.

=== Modern era ===
In 1958, Interstate 40 was completed in Tennessee, crossing the length of the state but passing 4 miles (6.4 km) north of the county. Following this, businesses began to leave the county for locations nearer urban areas and adjacent to the highway; and when two garment factories and an automobile parts plant ceased operations, the conditions were set for long-term economic stagnation.

By the mid 1960s, an effort had commenced to protect areas of the county along the Tennessee River for conservation and recreation. In January 1967, the site at Mousetail Landing, then owned by the Tennessee Valley Authority (TVA), was reported as under study for a future park. In 1968, a bill was vetoed by Governor Buford Ellington that would have provided funding to acquire land to establish a state park at the landing. By 1973, the park had seen further planning as part of a chain of four water-oriented parks along the Tennessee River, including Pickwick Landing State Park, Nathan Bedford Forrest State Park, and Paris Landing State Park. In 1977, Perry County leaders unanimously approved a resolution in support of the development of the park. That year, the TVA offered to give 100 acres (40 hectares) of land to the state, and a matching Federal grant of $1.1 million had been made available for the park's development. By 1979, the state had finalized plans to build the park and officially asked the TVA to turn over 1,200 acres (490 hectares) of riverfront land between Spring Creek and Lick Creek for the park. TVA approved the land transfer, with construction planned to begin late that year. The park officially opened to the public in 1986.

In 1971, an Old Order Mennonite community was established along Cane Creek near Lobelville. Both English as well as Plattdeutsch and Pennsylvania German speaking families settled in the area from other areas of Tennessee, from nearby states such as Arkansas, and internationally from Belize. This community generally avoids motor vehicles, except in certain limited situations sanctioned by their church, and most families are not connected to the electrical grid.

Nineteen farms in Perry County have been accepted into the Tennessee Century Farms Program. The program, established in 1975 by the Tennessee Department of Agriculture and now managed by the Center for Historic Preservation at Middle Tennessee State University, recognizes active farms that have been operated continuously by the same family for over 100 years. Included in the program are the Craig Farm and the Tucker Farm, established in 1818 and the oldest farm in the county.

== Geography and geology ==
Perry County is located on the western edge of Middle Tennessee. The topography of Perry County is characterized by high ridges separating creeks flowing into the county's two rivers and is typical of the Western Highland Rim region of Tennessee. The highest point in Perry County is approximately 980 feet (300 m) above sea level, located on an unnamed ridge in the far southeastern portion of the county near the borders of Lewis County and Wayne County. From its founding to 1846, the county was bifurcated by the Tennessee River. That year, the portion of the county west of the river was split off to form Decatur County, and the county took the general form it has today. Following numerous other relatively minor re-drawings, the county's borders were settled in their current positions in 1911.

=== Rivers ===
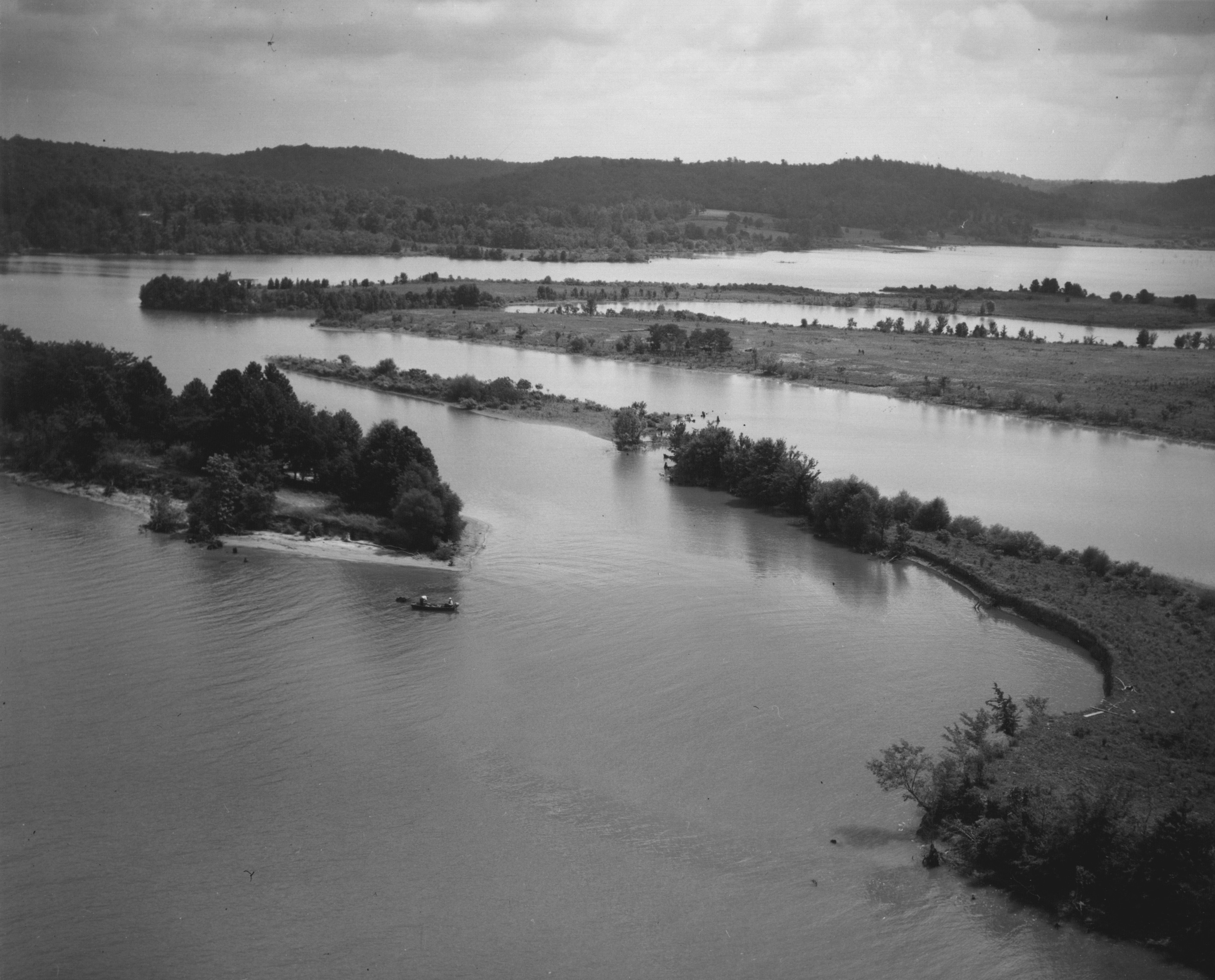
Aerial view of the Toms Creek embayment on the Tennessee River

Three rivers are found within Perry County: the Tennessee River, Buffalo River, and Duck River. The Tennessee River runs along the western boundary of the county, Buffalo River bisects the county, and a bend of the Duck River crosses into the county very briefly in its far northeastern corner. Even though the county's terrain is heavily influenced by the presence of water features, there are no dams in the county registered in the National Inventory of Dams.

==== Tennessee River ====
The Tennessee River forms the western border of Perry County, dividing it from Decatur County and Benton County. It flows south to north and is navigable through the entire length of the county. In 1944, with the construction of Kentucky Dam, portions of low-lying land adjacent to the river were inundated, although the societal and environmental impact was substantially lower than areas farther downstream. While the presence of the dam allows for some level of control against regular, catastrophic flooding along the basin, the regions of the county adjacent to the river and its tributaries are listed as Special Flood Hazard Areas. The base flood elevation line ranges from 375 feet (114 m) above mean sea level in the far northwestern portion of the county, to 385 feet (117 m) above mean sea level in the far southwestern portion.

Lady's Bluff, located approximately 11 miles (18 km) west of Linden, is the tallest bluff on the lower Tennessee River, and overlooks the section of the river known as The Narrows. The river is narrow enough at this point that barges cannot pass side by side and must pass through individually. Lady's Bluff Small Wild Area is a small federally protected public access park that includes the bluff and surrounding woodland. One possibly apocryphal story of the origin of the name of the bluff stems from a supposed incident where a woman was kidnapped and used as bait for an ambush by Native Americans against white settlers encroaching on their land.

==== Buffalo River ====
The Buffalo River flows south to north through the county before entering the Duck River just north of the county line in Humphreys County, and over 25% of the river's total watershed area is within the county. The towns of Linden and Lobelville and the unincorporated communities of Flat Woods and Beardstown are located along the river. Four river outfitters are located along the river within the county and add to its value as a recreational river.

=== Topography and hydrography ===
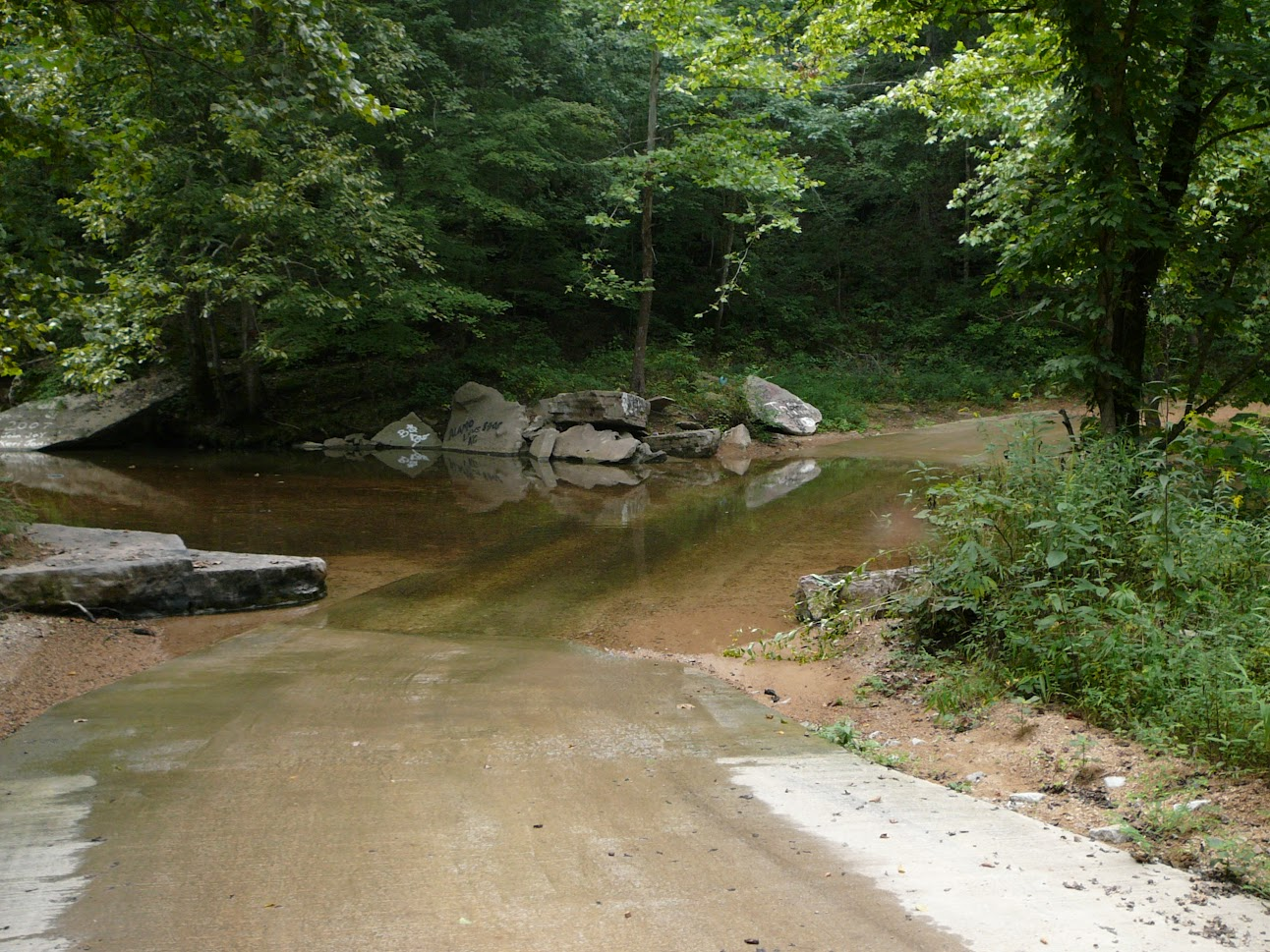
Road ford across Lick Creek

Most of the western half of the county forms part of the watershed for the Tennessee River, while most of the eastern half drains into the Buffalo River. A very small portion of the far northeastern corner of the county drains into the Duck River. The water table is high due to the hard substrate, creating numerous springs and shallow wells, and is charged by the Highland Rim aquifer. Typical spring and well yields range from 1 to 400 gallons per minute (4.5 to 1820 liters per minute).

Buffalo Ridge bisects the county from north to south between the Tennessee and Buffalo rivers. The ridge reaches approximately 700 feet (210 m) above sea level, with a topographic prominence of about 300 feet (91 m). Eight smaller spur ridges extend to the west from the main crest of Buffalo Ridge about 9 miles (14 km), creating the drainages for nine major creeks that flow into the Tennessee River. These creeks are, from north to south, Blue Creek, Crooked Creek, Roans Creek, Toms Creek, Lick Creek, Spring Creek, Cypress Creek, Marsh Creek, and Cedar Creek. To the east of the Buffalo River, additional ridges run east to west, similar to the terrain west of Buffalo Ridge. These ridges form the basins for the main Buffalo River tributaries within the county, Coon Creek, Brush Creek, Hurricane Creek, Short Creek, and Cane Creek.

Large tracts of natural wetlands exist within the county. One estimate based on analysis of satellite photography by the Tennessee Valley Authority estimated approximately 5,200 acres (2,100 hectares) of forested wetlands and 1,200 acres (490 hectares) of non-forested wetlands. These wetlands occur primarily along stream courses, and are some of the most productive wildlife habitat in the region.

=== Soil and geology ===
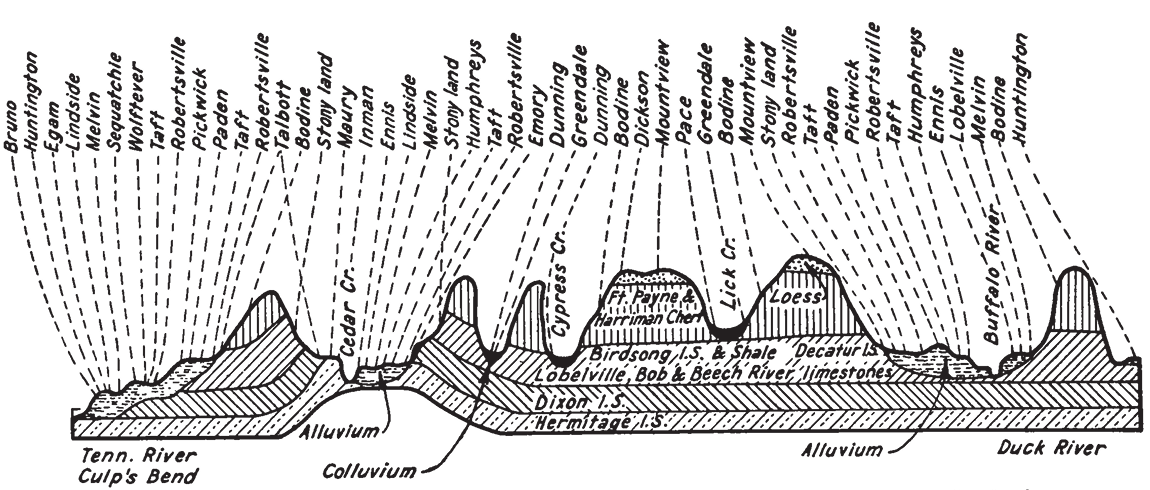
Cross section of the soil profile of Perry County

Soil deposits from the three river drainages located in the county have created fertile bottomland that are used intensively for agricultural purposes. The soil profile is generally very deep, with slopes and soil types suitable for agriculture and building construction. The ridge tops are well drained and loamy, with significant chert rock deposits. Reserves of chert, sand, gravel, limestone, and phosphate can be found in the county. Cherty limestone deposits are the most extensive geologic feature of the county, and an impermeable siltstone and shale base below the chert formations has led to the emergence of numerous fresh water springs.

Blue and gray limestone outcrops are present in most valleys of the county. These limestone formations are part of the Lobelville formation of the Silurian Brownsport Group and of the Lower Helderberg Group. Significant numbers of fossils have been found in the limestone. By the late 1830s, the fossils of various newly cataloged species of mollusks and trilobites found in the county were described in reports to the General Assembly. Iron ore is extremely abundant, with numerous deposits to the west of Buffalo Ridge.

=== Adjacent counties ===
- Humphreys County (north)
- Hickman County (northeast)
- Lewis County (southeast)
- Wayne County (south)
- Decatur County (west)
- Benton County (northwest)

== Weather and climate ==
Perry County has a humid subtropical climate (Köppen Cfa), characterized by hot, humid summers and cold winters. The average winter temperature is 47.8 °F (8.8 °C), and the average summer temperature is 75.7 °F (24.3 °C). The record low of −1 °F (−18 °C) occurred on January 24, 1963, and the record high of 105 °F (41 °C) occurred on July 17, 1980. Average seasonal snowfall is 5.5 inches (14 cm). Thunderstorms are relatively common in the county, with an average of 53 days per year seeing thunderstorm activity, usually between May and August.

National Weather Service records list sixteen tornadoes which have been reported in Perry County, with the first one recorded in 1909. Out of these, 14 were reported since 1999. The deadliest tornado recorded in the county happened on May 27, 1917, which killed five and injured an additional 67 people. Its intensity was estimated as EF/4. Perry County was also struck during the May 5, 1999, tornado outbreak. It was hit by the strongest tornado reported during the outbreak, killing three people and causing substantial damage to Linden. Another deadly tornado hit the county during the December 23, 2015, outbreak, with two killed.

Confirmed tornadoes by Enhanced Fujita rating
EFU	EF0	EF1	EF2	EF3	EF4	EF5	Total
0	3	6	5	0	2	0	16

Climate data for Perry County, Tennessee (1991–2020, as recorded in Linden)
Month	Jan	Feb	Mar	Apr	May	Jun	Jul	Aug	Sep	Oct	Nov	Dec	Year
Record high °F (°C)	76 (24)	82 (28)	89 (32)	92 (33)	96 (36)	104 (40)	105 (41)	105 (41)	101 (38)	97 (36)	93 (34)	88 (31)	105 (41)
Mean daily maximum °F (°C)	48.6 (9.2)	53.2 (11.8)	62.6 (17.0)	72.0 (22.2)	78.7 (25.9)	85.1 (29.5)	88.7 (31.5)	88.5 (31.4)	83.3 (28.5)	73.2 (22.9)	61.4 (16.3)	51.9 (11.1)	70.6 (21.4)
Daily mean °F (°C)	37.5 (3.1)	41.2 (5.1)	49.3 (9.6)	58.1 (14.5)	66.4 (19.1)	74.0 (23.3)	77.8 (25.4)	76.9 (24.9)	70.5 (21.4)	59.0 (15.0)	48.3 (9.1)	40.7 (4.8)	58.3 (14.6)
Mean daily minimum °F (°C)	26.5 (−3.1)	29.2 (−1.6)	36.1 (2.3)	44.2 (6.8)	54.1 (12.3)	62.9 (17.2)	67.0 (19.4)	65.4 (18.6)	57.8 (14.3)	44.9 (7.2)	35.2 (1.8)	29.6 (−1.3)	46.1 (7.8)
Record low °F (°C)	−18 (−28)	−10 (−23)	6 (−14)	19 (−7)	30 (−1)	36 (2)	46 (8)	41 (5)	35 (2)	21 (−6)	6 (−14)	−8 (−22)	−18 (−28)
Average precipitation inches (mm)	4.60 (117)	4.91 (125)	4.93 (125)	5.64 (143)	6.36 (162)	5.31 (135)	5.06 (129)	3.20 (81)	4.20 (107)	3.82 (97)	3.89 (99)	5.67 (144)	57.59 (1,463)
Average snowfall inches (cm)	0.9 (2.3)	0.7 (1.8)	0.4 (1.0)	0.0 (0.0)	0.0 (0.0)	0.0 (0.0)	0.0 (0.0)	0.0 (0.0)	0.0 (0.0)	0.0 (0.0)	0.0 (0.0)	0.1 (0.25)	2.1 (5.3)
Average precipitation days (≥ 0.01 in)	9.0	8.5	9.0	8.7	9.4	8.2	8.2	6.8	6.5	7.1	7.9	9.1	98.4
Average snowy days (≥ 0.1 in)	0.3	0.4	0.2	0.0	0.0	0.0	0.0	0.0	0.0	0.0	0.0	0.0	0.9
Source: NOAA

== Flora and fauna ==
About 80% of the county is wooded. Numerous species of economically important timber trees are found in the county, including white oak, walnut, black oak, hickory, and chestnut oak. 561 species of wild plants have been collected in the county. Perry County has numerous native game species, including whitetail deer, rabbit, eastern wild turkey, gray squirrel, and fox squirrel. Bobwhite quail are also present, however the population is low due to a lack of suitable habitat. Mourning dove nesting populations are typically also low, although large numbers transit the area during seasonal migrations. Common migratory waterfowl found in the county include wood duck, mallard, gadwall, Canada goose, and the Buffalo River and its tributaries are noted wood duck nesting locations. Mink, muskrat, and beaver are found throughout wetlands in the county. There are large populations of bobcat, opossum, gray fox, striped skunk, and coyote, as well as numerous species of reptiles, amphibians, and birds. Alexander Cave in the far northeastern part of the county is an important roosting and hibernation location for the endangered gray bat. Numerous fish species, including game fish such as the largemouth bass, smallmouth bass, crappie, and catfish are found in the rivers and streams of the county. The value of the large amount of game and fish found in the county was reported as early as 1932, and continues to be a major driver of tourism in the county.

The remains of prehistoric megafauna have been discovered in the county. In September 1820, the skeletal remains of a large animal, possibly a giant ground sloth (Megalonyx), were excavated in an unidentified cave in the county. The remains were reportedly recovered by a Nashville museum operator and collector, but have since been lost.

=== Wildlife reintroduction ===
By the late 1940s, fewer than 1,000 whitetail deer were found in the state, having been hunted to the brink of extirpation. In the early 1930s, the Tennessee Game and Fish Commission, the United States Forest Service, the Tennessee Valley Authority, and the United States Navy began restocking efforts on public lands in the State. In 1949, the Game and Fish Commission began their first reintroduction effort in Perry County on public lands, later expanding reintroductions to private lands in the 1950s. By the 1950s, the populations had grown large enough to sustain a limited degree of hunting. In 1960, 30 deer were harvested in the county; by 1996, that number had risen to nearly 2,200.

By the 1950s, wild turkeys had been eliminated from the county. A reintroduction and habitat management program was conducted by the Tennessee Wildlife Resources Agency (the successor agency to the Game and Fish Commission), leading to the successful return of the species to the county. While the overall number of turkeys is moderate, good local populations are found within certain areas.

== Demographics ==
As of the 2020 census, Perry County is a rural, sparsely populated county with a population of 8,366 and an average density of 20.2 persons per square mile (7.8 persons/km^{2}). It is the least densely populated county in Tennessee.

Its population peaked at 8,815 in 1910 and began a steady decline through 1970. The population began growing again after 1970, with sharp increases in the 1970s and 1990s, and by 2020 it still had not surpassed the population numbers and density of the early 1900s.

Historical population
Census	Pop.	Note	%±
1820	2,384		—
1830	7,094		197.6%
1840	7,419		4.6%
1850	5,821		−21.5%
1860	6,042		3.8%
1870	6,925		14.6%
1880	7,174		3.6%
1890	7,785		8.5%
1900	8,800		13.0%
1910	8,815		0.2%
1920	7,765		−11.9%
1930	7,147		−8.0%
1940	7,535		5.4%
1950	6,462		−14.2%
1960	5,273		−18.4%
1970	5,238		−0.7%
1980	6,111		16.7%
1990	6,612		8.2%
2000	7,631		15.4%
2010	7,915		3.7%
2020	8,366		5.7%
2025 (est.)	9,126	▲	9.1%
U.S. Decennial Census; 1790–1960 1900–1990; 1990–2000 2010–2014

=== Language ===
A language other than English was spoken at home by 6.5% of the population.

=== Racial and ethnic composition ===
Perry County, Tennessee – Racial and ethnic composition Note: the US Census treats Hispanic/Latino as an ethnic category. This table excludes Latinos from the racial categories and assigns them to a separate category. Hispanics/Latinos may be of any race.
Race / Ethnicity (NH = Non-Hispanic)	Pop 1980	Pop 1990	Pop 2000	Pop 2010	Pop 2020	% 1980	% 1990	% 2000	% 2010	% 2020
White alone (NH)	5,913	6,442	7,333	7,502	7,700	96.76%	97.43%	96.09%	94.78%	92.04%
Black or African American alone (NH)	143	119	130	116	195	2.34%	1.80%	1.70%	1.47%	2.33%
Native American or Alaska Native alone (NH)	7	8	26	43	41	0.11%	0.12%	0.34%	0.54%	0.49%
Asian alone (NH)	5	7	7	14	26	0.08%	0.11%	0.09%	0.18%	0.31%
Native Hawaiian or Pacific Islander alone (NH)	x	x	4	0	1	x	x	0.05%	0.00%	0.01%
Other race alone (NH)	0	0	7	2	21	0.00%	0.00%	0.09%	0.03%	0.25%
Mixed race or Multiracial (NH)	x	x	63	107	255	x	x	0.83%	1.35%	3.05%
Hispanic or Latino (any race)	43	36	61	131	127	0.70%	0.54%	0.80%	1.66%	1.52%
Total	6,111	6,612	7,631	7,915	8,366	100.00%	100.00%	100.00%	100.00%	100.00%

=== 2020 census ===
As of the 2020 census, there were 8,366 people in the county, and the median age was 44.6 years. 21.5% of residents were under the age of 18 and 22.3% of residents were 65 years of age or older. For every 100 females there were 104.1 males, and for every 100 females age 18 and over there were 102.3 males age 18 and over.

The racial makeup of the county was 92.6% White, 2.4% Black or African American, 0.6% American Indian and Alaska Native, 0.3% Asian, <0.1% Native Hawaiian and Pacific Islander, 0.6% from some other race, and 3.5% from two or more races. Hispanic or Latino residents of any race comprised 1.5% of the population.

<0.1% of residents lived in urban areas, while 100.0% lived in rural areas.

There were 3,413 households in the county, of which 27.1% had children under the age of 18 living in them. Of all households, 48.7% were married-couple households, 21.7% were households with a male householder and no spouse or partner present, and 24.0% were households with a female householder and no spouse or partner present. About 31.4% of all households were made up of individuals and 15.1% had someone living alone who was 65 years of age or older. The average household size was 2.68.

There were 4,797 housing units, of which 28.9% were vacant. Among occupied housing units, 76.9% were owner-occupied and 23.1% were renter-occupied. The homeowner vacancy rate was 1.7% and the rental vacancy rate was 10.5%.

== Economy ==
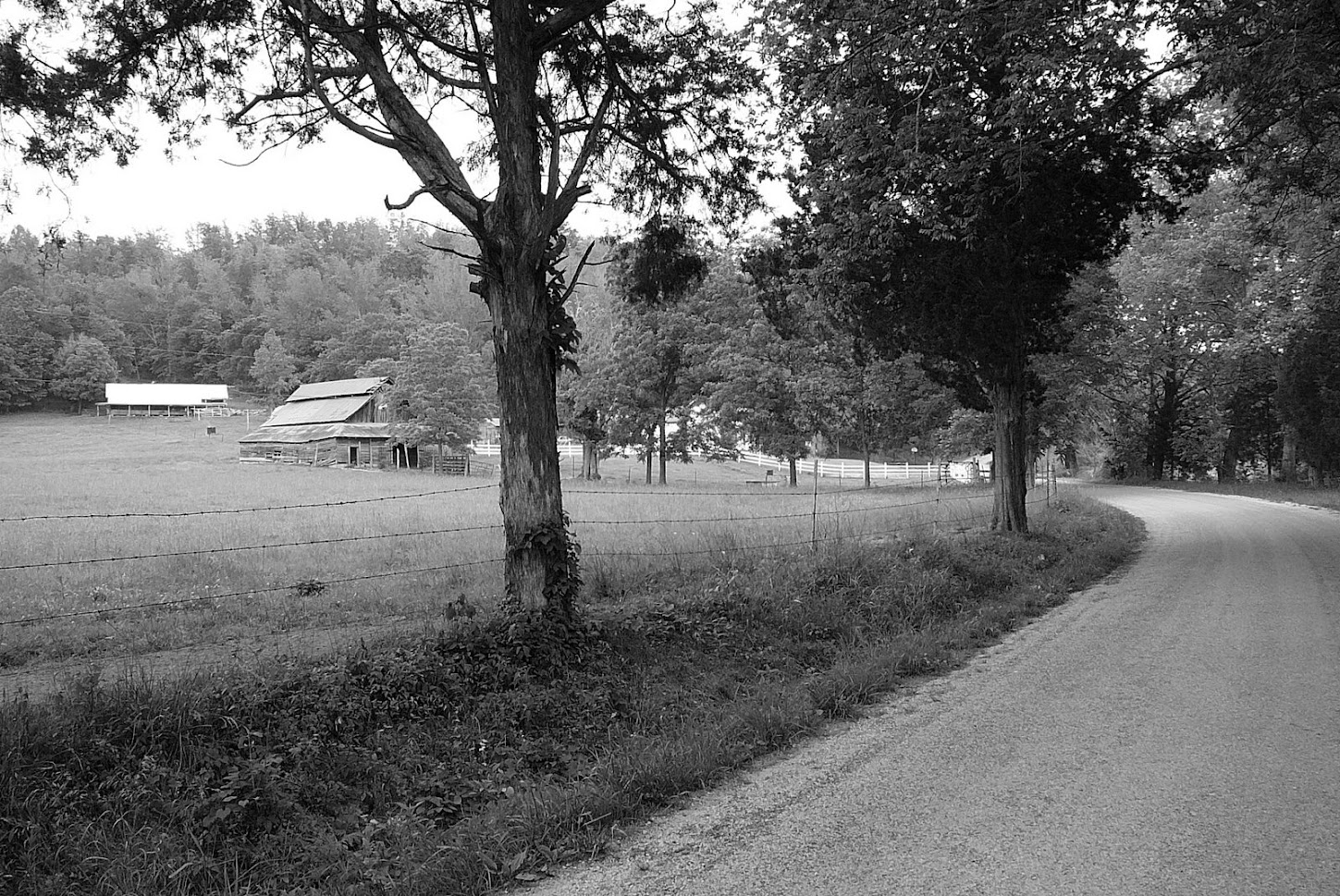
Farm on Short Creek, typical of small farms in the county

Agriculture makes up a significant portion of the economy of Perry County. In 2017, 287 farms were in operation, averaging 215 acres (87 hectares) each. Over 35,000 acres (14,000 hectares) of land were utilized for a variety of agricultural activities, including crop production, forestry, and pasture land. A 2018 study showed that agriculture and ag-supporting industries contributed $49.6 million to the county's economy, with 525 jobs (about 17% of total employment in the county). Over 23,000 acres (9,300 hectares), totaling about 10% of the county's area, are rated by the USDA as prime farmland. In 1999, the USDA's National Agricultural Statistics Service reported that 3,200 acres (1,300 hectares) were planted in corn, 2,600 acres (1,100 hectares) were planted in soybeans, and another 300 acres (120 hectares) were left fallow as part of a conservation program. Additional smaller acreages were planted with sorghum, snap beans, watermelons, and sweet corn. Pasture and hay production utilized nearly 30,000 acres (12,000 hectares) of farmland in the county.

Mousetail Landing State Park, the largest protected area in the county, is a significant driver of regional nature tourism. In 2021, tourist expenditures in the county totaled $5.8 million, surpassing pre-pandemic spending by $600,000. This spending generated around $200,000 in local taxes, and 54 jobs totaling about $900,000 in wages were created through tourism-related employment. The county's other accessible protected area, the TVA-managed Lady's Bluff Small Wild Area, is a small preserve on and around Lady's Bluff on the Tennessee River north of Mousetail Landing popular with nature walkers and rock climbers. A third protected area, Dry Branch State Park, is partially located in the far eastern corner of the county near the border of Lewis and Hickman counties. It is not currently open to the public, however plans were announced in June 2025 to re-designate the preserve as a state park with amenities. Four river outfitters are located within the county along the Buffalo River, as well as a Boy Scouts of America operated canoe base and camp, adding to the river's economic impact. Additionally, the Tennessee Baptist Mission Board maintains a conference center, hotel, and outdoor center on the Buffalo River near Linden.

The Perry County Chamber of Commerce and Tourism conducts marketing efforts to draw more nature-oriented tourists to the area, using the slogan "Perry County: It's Just Our Nature". In 2008, the first annual Blooming Arts Festival was held in Linden in a further attempt to increase tourism. Only one hotel operates in Perry County, the Commodore Hotel in Linden.

The earliest known bank in Perry County was organized by 1890 as the Linden Bank and Trust. It experienced a series of mergers and buyouts, and is now a branch of FirstBank. The other bank operating in the county, the Bank of Perry County, was organized in 1905 as the Bank of Lobelville. By 1975, it had opened branches in both Lobelville and Linden.

=== Poverty and unemployment ===
Perry County ranks below state and national averages in numerous economic indicators. As of 2024, Perry County was one of eight Tennessee counties listed by the Appalachian Regional Commission as a distressed county, ranking it among the bottom 10% of counties in the United States in terms of poverty rate, unemployment, and income. Perry County's Gini coefficient is .54, indicating a significantly higher level of income inequality than the rest of Tennessee. As of 2020, the gross domestic product of all industries in the county was $190 million. In 2019, the poverty rate in the county was estimated at 16.1%, three percent higher than the statewide average. The median household income was $41,034, and the per capita income was $27,970. Property values in the county are significantly below the statewide average. In 2019, the median value of owner-occupied housing was $88,100, compared to $167,200 statewide. The rate of owner-occupied housing however, was significantly higher at 82% versus the statewide average of 66%. Numerous challenges to economic expansion exist within the county, including a lack of reliable broadband internet access, no four-lane or controlled access highways, and no nearby US Department of Agriculture certified livestock meat processing.

Perry County was severely impacted by the economic recession of 2008 and 2009. Unemployment reached nearly 29%, which at the time was the highest in the state of Tennessee, and the second highest in the United States. The high unemployment rate was due to the closure of a major automotive parts plant that employed a significant portion of the county's residents. Governor Phil Bredesen made Perry County a focus of his state stimulus package in an effort to lower unemployment. Within two years, the unemployment rate was lowered to 14%, a reduction partially attributed to the governor's subsidized employment program. In 2012, an auto parts supplier opened an injection molded plastics facility in a then-shuttered factory space in Linden, providing over 400 jobs to the local community and substantially relieving unemployment in the county.

In April 2020, seasonally unadjusted unemployment peaked again at over 24%, compared to the state average of 15.6%. In 2020, a rubber parts manufacturer that was the largest employer in Lobelville shut down, significantly adding to the county's unemployment rate. As of May 2025, Perry County's unemployment rate was 4.8%, the third highest in the state. This rate was 1.3% higher than the statewide average, and 1.3% to 1.8% higher than other surrounding counties.

== Government ==
The government of Perry County is overseen by a county mayor and a county commission. The county mayor is elected at-large every four years. The county is divided into six districts, each of which elect two commissioners to the county commission. The districts are further divided into two voting precincts, save for the districts encompassing Linden and Lobelville, which each have a single voting precinct. Commission meetings are held monthly. Additional elected officials include the property assessor, register of deeds, sheriff, county trustee, and road superintendent.

For the United States House of Representatives, Perry County is part of Tennessee's 8th congressional district. Additionally, the county is part of the 28th District for the state senate and the 72nd district for the state house. Perry County is legally considered part of Middle Tennessee, though prior to 1991 it was part of West Tennessee.

=== Courts, crime, and emergency services ===
Perry County has one elected judge who presides over the county's general sessions court and juvenile court. The county falls under the 32nd Judicial District of Tennessee, which includes a circuit court and chancery court. The 32nd Judicial District covers Perry, Lewis, and Hickman counties, and is presided over by Judge Michael Spitzer. The 32nd District's circuit court is the immediate appellate court for the county's general sessions and juvenile courts. Prior to August 2022, the county was part of the 21st District, which included Williamson County. After concerns were raised about elections for the court being controlled by the much more populous Williamson County, the 32nd District was created to split off the three smaller counties into a new district.

In addition to state and federal agencies the county is served by one law enforcement department, the Perry County Sheriff's Office, headed by an elected sheriff. The sheriff is responsible for all law enforcement functions, including crime prevention and investigation, apprehension of criminals, and patrolling the county's roads. Additionally, the sheriff's office is responsible for providing bailiffs to county courts, service court processes and orders, and operating the county's jail. In 2025, the Perry County Sheriff's Office was the subject of national and international media scrutiny, as well as criticism from several civil rights organizations including the Cato Institute and FIRE. On September 22, Larry Bushart of Lexington, Tennessee was arrested for making threats against Perry County High School after he posted an image on social media referencing a 2024 school shooting in Perry, Iowa following the assassination of Charlie Kirk. Perry County Sherriff Nick Weems stated that he had received reports from members of the public that they believed it was a threat against the county's high school, though he also stated that he was aware that the post was referencing a different school. After over a month in jail, Bushart was released on October 29 when all charges were dropped against him. On December 17, Bushart's attorneys filed suit in federal court against the sheriff, an investigator, and the county government, alleging that they violated his First Amendment rights. In May 2026, Bushart won a settlement of $835,000 from the county and sheriff in exchange for dismissing the case.

Property crime rates in the county are lower than both the state and national average, while violent crime rates are lower than the state but slightly above the national average. Property crime rates are 13.7 per 1000 people and violent crime rates are 2.5 per 1000 people, versus the statewide averages of 29.7 and 6.3 and national averages of 16.7 and 2 respectively. Public safety professionals make up .35% of the population, compared to a statewide average of .77%.

Perry County is home to a single professional, paid fire department, the Linden Fire Department, as well as a county rescue squad. Lobelville and a number of unincorporated communities within the county are host to volunteer fire departments. The Sgt. 1st Class Michael W. Braden National Guard Armory is located in Lobelville. Named after a Tennessee Army National Guard member murdered at the armory in 2014, the armory hosts a subordinate unit of the 278th Armored Cavalry Regiment.

=== Elections ===
Historically, like most of Middle Tennessee, Perry County was overwhelmingly Democratic. Although it voted to elect Warren G. Harding in his record popular vote landslide of 1920, otherwise no Republican presidential candidate managed to carry the county up to 2004. It did, though, give a plurality to segregationist Alabama Governor George Wallace in 1968. Since 2000, Perry County has seen a very rapid trend towards the Republican Party typical of many rural southern counties. In 2016, it was only marginally less Republican than the traditional Unionist Republican bastions of East Tennessee.

United States presidential election results for Perry County, Tennessee
Year	Republican		Democratic		Third party(ies)	
Year	No.	%	No.	%	No.	%
1912	379	32.15%	664	56.32%	136	11.54%
1916	483	41.96%	663	57.60%	5	0.43%
1920	747	51.91%	692	48.09%	0	0.00%
1924	268	34.99%	494	64.49%	4	0.52%
1928	359	36.82%	616	63.18%	0	0.00%
1932	182	20.38%	705	78.95%	6	0.67%
1936	210	18.90%	896	80.65%	5	0.45%
1940	332	23.66%	1,068	76.12%	3	0.21%
1944	387	33.42%	771	66.58%	0	0.00%
1948	459	26.26%	1,196	68.42%	93	5.32%
1952	762	39.00%	1,192	61.00%	0	0.00%
1956	694	39.43%	1,052	59.77%	14	0.80%
1960	645	37.13%	1,076	61.95%	16	0.92%
1964	514	26.31%	1,440	73.69%	0	0.00%
1968	519	25.58%	726	35.78%	784	38.64%
1972	900	48.10%	937	50.08%	34	1.82%
1976	520	23.63%	1,660	75.42%	21	0.95%
1980	783	35.08%	1,401	62.77%	48	2.15%
1984	948	41.82%	1,316	58.05%	3	0.13%
1988	854	41.14%	1,208	58.19%	14	0.67%
1992	708	24.25%	1,889	64.71%	322	11.03%
1996	747	31.31%	1,444	60.52%	195	8.17%
2000	1,165	40.65%	1,650	57.57%	51	1.78%
2004	1,522	48.32%	1,579	50.13%	49	1.56%
2008	1,596	53.20%	1,329	44.30%	75	2.50%
2012	1,578	60.21%	992	37.85%	51	1.95%
2016	2,167	75.90%	597	20.91%	91	3.19%
2020	2,775	80.95%	615	17.94%	38	1.11%
2024	3,139	84.47%	558	15.02%	19	0.51%

== Cities and towns ==
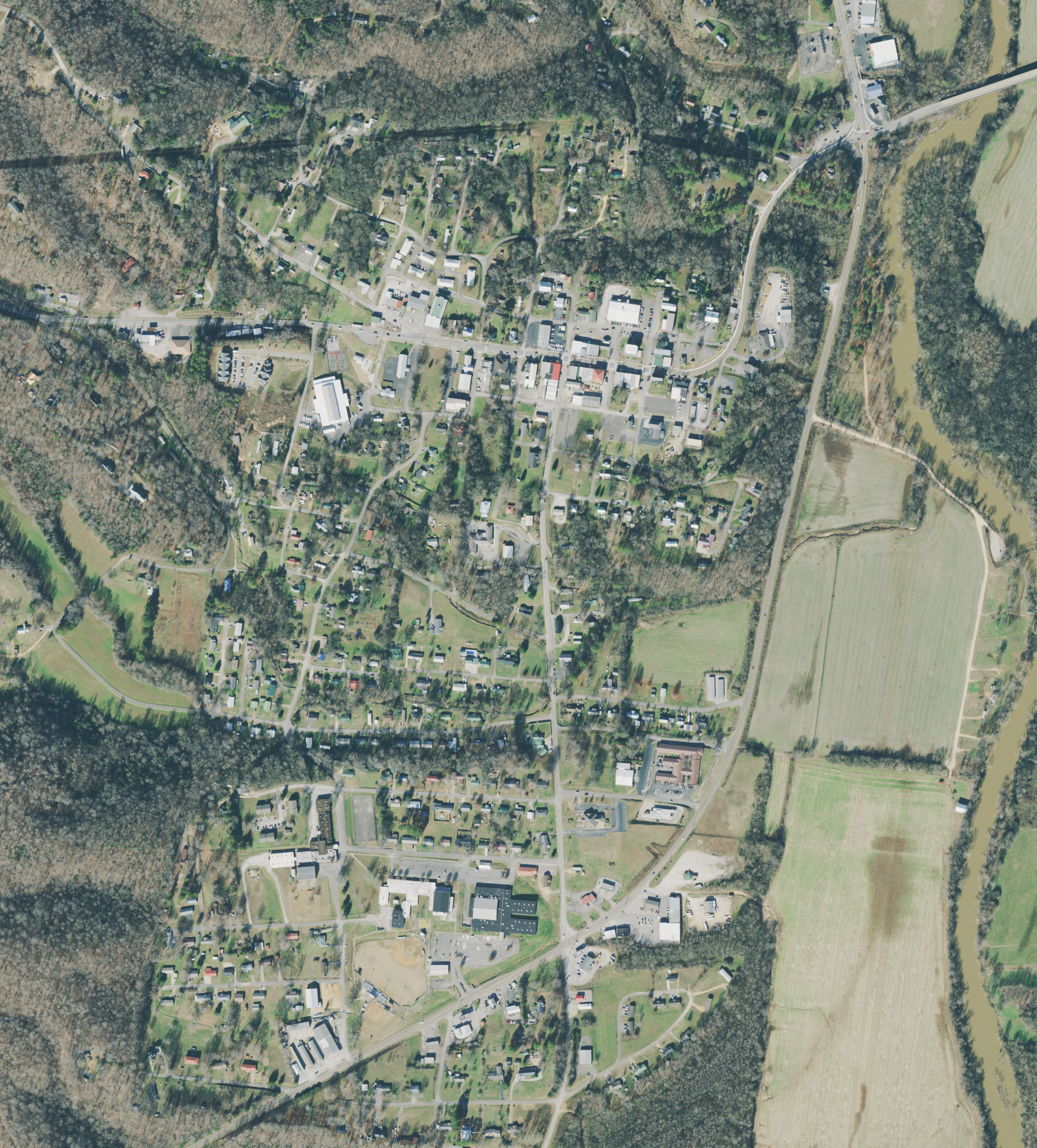
Aerial view of Linden. U.S. Route 412 crosses the northern part of the town from west to east, while Tennessee State Route 13 passes east of the town from north to south.

Linden, the county seat, is an incorporated town located centrally in the county, at the intersection of U.S. Route 412 and Tennessee State Route 13, to the west of where Route 412 crosses the Buffalo River. Lobelville is an incorporated city located along State Route 13 west of the Buffalo River in the northern portion of the county. In addition to the two incorporated communities, numerous unincorporated populated places are located throughout the county.

=== Incorporated communities by population ===
Place	Population	Founded
Linden	997	1848
Lobelville	919	1854

=== Unincorporated communities ===
- Beardstown
- Chestnut Grove
- Flat Woods
- Horner
- Pine View
- Peters Landing
- Pope
- Spring Creek
- Standing Rock
- Sugar Hill

== Transportation and infrastructure ==
Transportation infrastructure in Perry County includes one U.S. highway, numerous state highways, and one general aviation airport. No railroads or Interstate Highways are present within the county. The Alvin C. York Bridge carries U.S. Route 412 over the Tennessee river and is the only crossing of the river in the county. Although the western border of the county is a major navigable waterway, commercial activity is limited to small boat docks and two landings servicing timber and gravel barges, with no large harbors or terminals. No public transportation systems or commercial scheduled passenger services of any type operate in the county. According to a 2015 study, Perry County commuters drove alone to work at the highest rate of any county in Tennessee, reflecting low access to carpooling opportunities or public transportation.

Poor transportation infrastructure has been a persistent issue in the county. One 1874 report noted the challenges to economic development brought on by a lack of rail access, paved roads, and bridges. In 1906, the lack of railroad access was again cited in regional newspapers as the limiting factor to economic growth and resource extraction.

=== Major highways ===
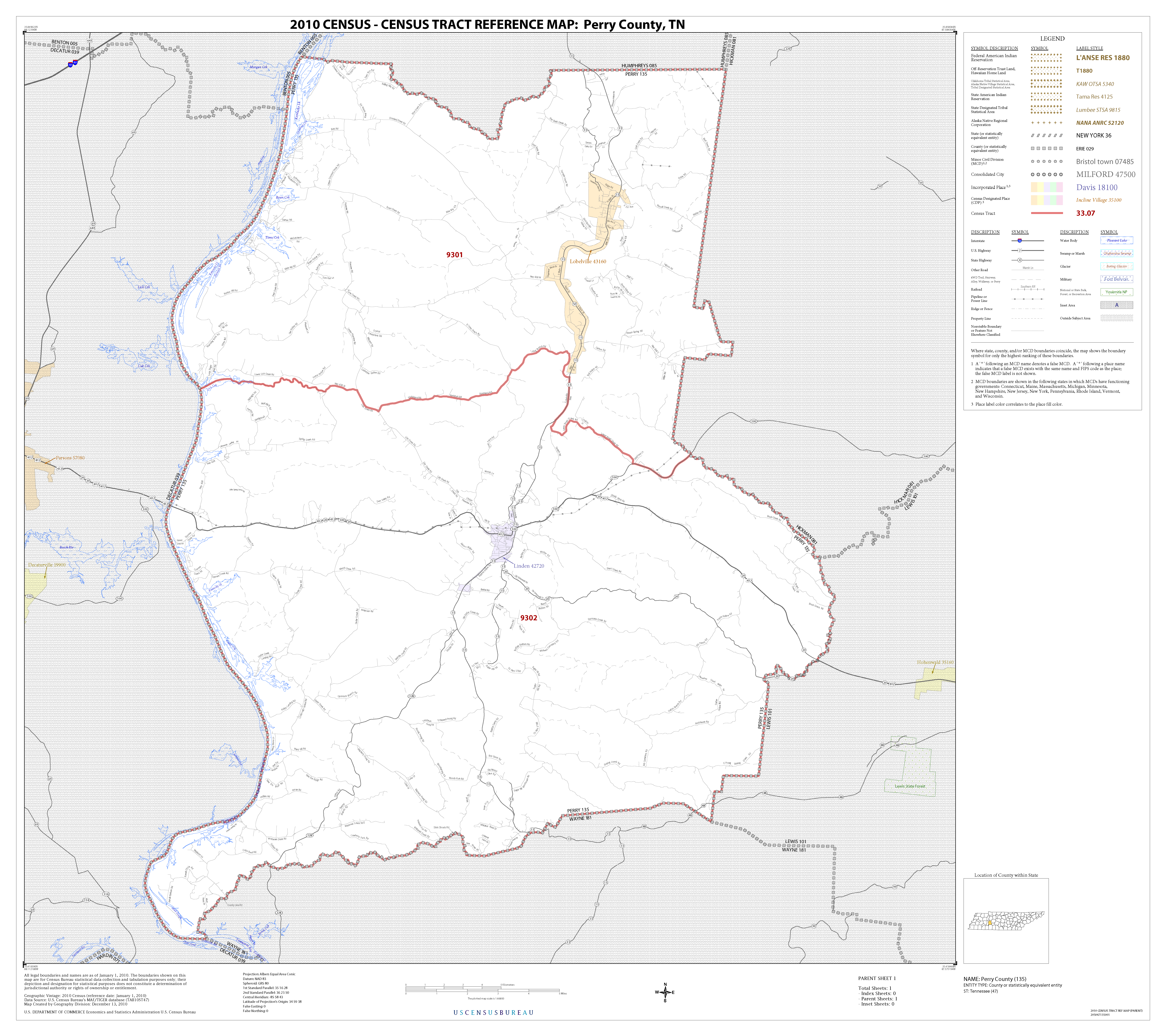
2010 census map depicting Perry County's road network and census districts

One federal highway, four primary state highways, and two secondary state highways transit the county. The lone federal highway, U.S. Route 412, connects Linden with the town of Parsons in Decatur County 18 miles (29 km) to the west and the town of Hohenwald in Lewis County 19 miles (31 km) to the east, with a western terminus near Dyersburg, Tennessee and eastern terminus near Columbia, Tennessee. Tennessee State Route 20 is concurrent with U.S. Route 412 through the county. Tennessee State Route 100 is also largely concurrent with U.S. Route 412, diverging from U.S. Route 412 east of Linden and entering Hickman County. The primary north-south route is Tennessee State Route 13, connecting with Interstate 40 9 miles (14 km) north of Lobelville in Humphreys County. Tennessee State Route 438 transits the northern half of the county in a general east-west orientation, connecting Centerville in Hickman County with U.S. Route 412 near the Tennessee River. Tennessee State Route 128 connects the town of Clifton in Wayne, County with State Route 13 south of Linden. Tennessee State Route 48 only briefly crosses the county's far southeast corner.

U.S. Route 412 west of Linden, and State Route 13 south of Linden are designated as Tennessee Parkways. State Route 13 and State Route 128 are both designated and signed as part of the Tennessee River Trail Scenic Byway through their entire routes in the county.

- US 412
- SR 13
- SR 20
- SR 48
- SR 100
- SR 128
- SR 438

=== Airports ===
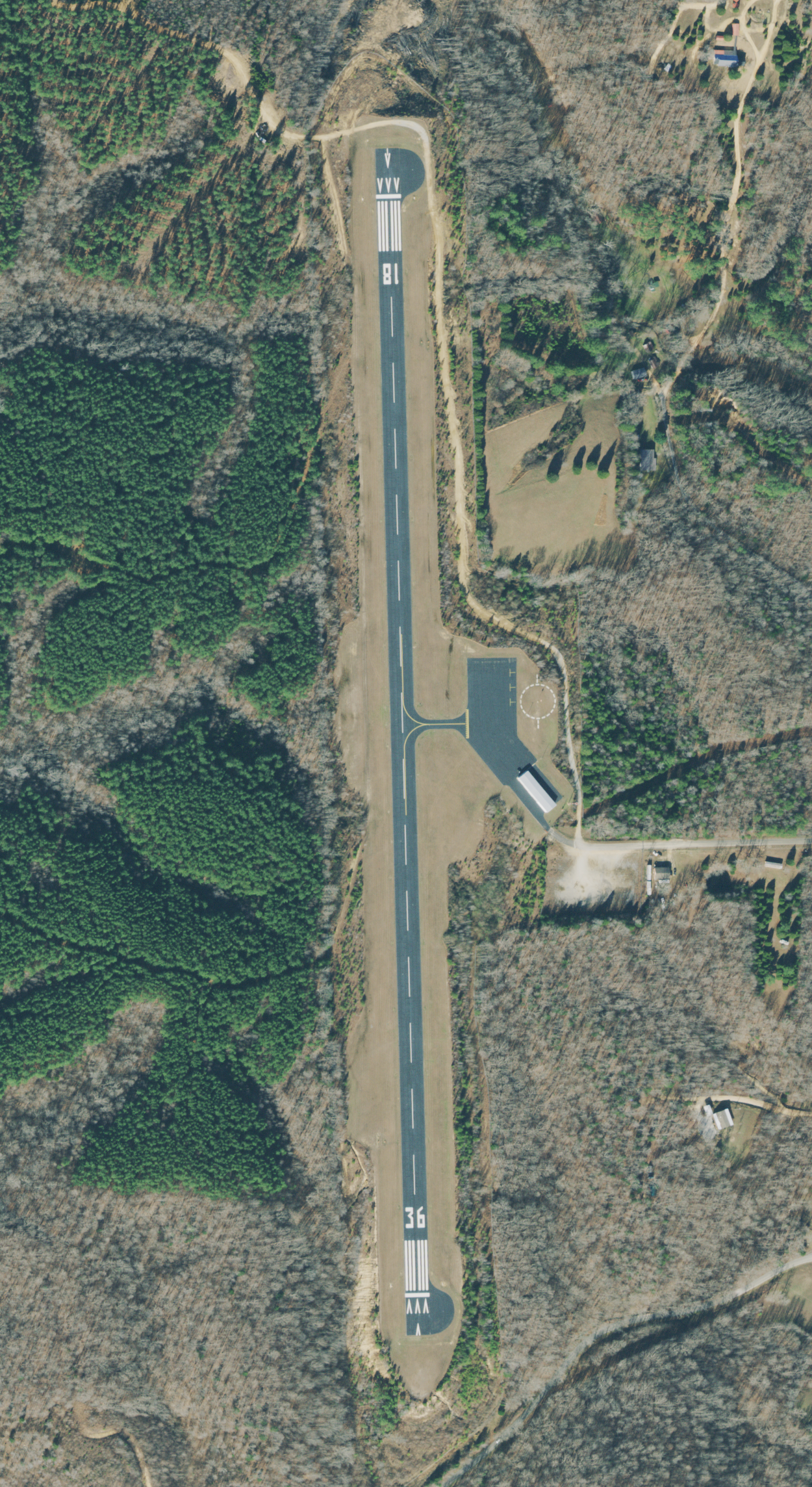
Aerial view of James Tucker Airport (M15)

Perry County is served by a small public general aviation airport, James Tucker Airport, constructed in 1962 south of Linden. Efforts to bring an airport to Perry County date back to 1946. A group of students from Lobelville High School petitioned the county to construct a public airport after having been introduced to aviation through the donation of a Link Trainer to the school. In addition to the public general aviation airport, a private-use helipad (FAA identifier 5TN8) is located at the now-closed Perry Community Hospital in Linden.

=== Pipelines ===
Tennessee Gas Pipeline operates a natural gas pipeline that bisects Perry County. A pumping station for the line is located in Lobelville, and was one of the largest pumping stations in the United States when it was constructed. This station and sections of the nearby pipeline are a listed EPA Superfund site. A lawsuit against the pipeline company concerning both the pipeline and the pumping station alleged the release of PCB contaminants into the local environment. As a result of this release, one study determined that those exposed suffered various neurological problems, including slowed reaction speeds and cognition problems.

=== Telecommunications and electric power ===
In 1900, Bell Telephone Company established service in the county. Lines were run from the north, diverging from the lines along the railroad in Waverly.

Typical of many rural counties, the rate of broadband internet adoption and availability remains low, with about 59% of households reporting access to broadband internet, compared to 78% statewide, as of 2020.

Electric power in the county is provided through Meriwether Lewis Electric Cooperative, a non-profit utility cooperative that distributes power purchased from the Tennessee Valley Authority. Many parts of the county did not have electric service until after the middle of the 20th century. Some population centers, such as the community of Flatwoods in southern Perry County, did not receive power until 1950.

== Education ==
Perry County has one unified school district, the Perry County School System. There are four schools in the district, including one high school (Perry County High School), and three primary schools (Linden Middle School, Linden Elementary School, and Lobelville School), overseen by the Perry County Board of Education. In addition to the four in-person facilities, the county also maintains the Perry County Virtual School, a public remote-learning system for students in grades 4 through 12.

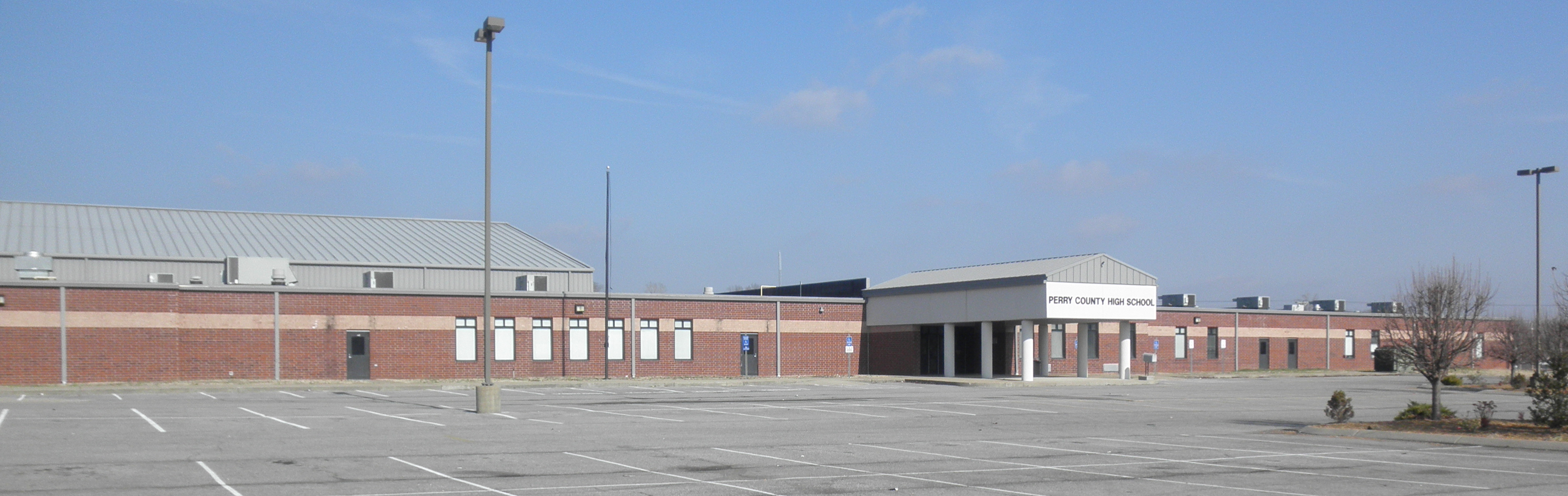
Perry County High School

The county's first high school was opened in Linden in 1922. Prior to that, all students wishing to have an education beyond the 8th grade had to attend school outside of the county. The county's current high school, Perry County High School, was established in 1963 in Linden with the consolidation of the high schools in Linden and Lobelville. A number of parents and school administrators in Lobelville resisted the consolidation due to the distance from Linden, as well as concerns that the new school would not be ready for the beginning of the 1963 school year. In response, a special school district was granted to Lobelville by the state legislature in 1963. However, in an effort to force the consolidation to proceed, the Tennessee Board of Education ruled that the district did not qualify for any funds and would not be accredited. A group of Lobelville parents sued to keep the school district open, with volunteer teachers filling in for the 1963 school year. The case went to the Tennessee Supreme Court, which affirmed in 1964 that the State Board of Education was within its rights to deny funding to the special school district, with the justification that there was an insufficient number of students in the proposed special district to justify expenditure of resources. The consolidation went forward, with the Lobelville school closing later that year.

Prior to the passage of the 1964 Civil Rights Act, the county exploited loopholes in state and federal laws to prevent black children from attending high school in the county. In 1954, the county hired a local black farmer and Korean War veteran, McDonald Craig, to drive a bus to transport black children to attend high school out of the county. Using a school bus he purchased from a local Chevrolet dealer, who also happened to be descended from Craig's enslaved grandparents' owners, Craig bussed black students to Montgomery High School in Lexington, Tennessee. This bussing program lasted until the fall of 1965, when the county's schools were integrated.

The county's high school graduation rate is very high, at 97.5%, versus a statewide average of 90.4%. Approximately 75% of the population over age 25 has a high school diploma or equivalent, while 12% have a bachelor's degree or higher. Both are significantly below the statewide averages of 87% and 27%, respectively.

In 1947, the county established a board and funding for a public library. By 1986 two public libraries had been established, one in Linden and another in Lobelville.

== Media and entertainment ==
Throughout its history, numerous radio stations and newspapers have existed in Perry County. As of 2022, the county is served by two radio stations, WOPC on the FM band and WMAK on the AM band. Six different newspapers are known to have been printed in the county, starting in 1880 with the Linden Times. Subsequent newspapers included the Linden Mail (1890s to 1910s), the New Age (1900s to 1920s), the Perry County News (1913 to late 1910s), and the Perry Countian (1924 to 1978). In 1976 the Buffalo River Review began publication. It merged with the Perry Countian in 1978, and continues publication weekly as the county's sole print newspaper.

=== Music and film ===
In 1928 the Weems String Band, a folk music group originating in the county, recorded with Columbia Records what is widely considered to be one of the best folk music recordings of the era. The two songs on the record are the only known works recorded by the group. The band was drawn by noted cartoonist Robert Crumb and featured in a series of trading cards done by the artist on musicians.

In 1957, the film Natchez Trace, starring Zachary Scott, Marcia Henderson, and William Campbell, and directed by Alan Crosland, Jr., was filmed in the southern part of the county near Flatwoods. Numerous locals appeared as extras in the lost film, which chronicled the life of John Murrell, a bandit who operated in the area in the early 19th century.

Perry County was featured in a 1992 episode of the television show Unsolved Mysteries that discussed the case of George Owens, an elderly man from Nolensville, Tennessee who disappeared on July 22, 1985. Owens was last seen in Lobelville, where he purchased ice cream and cigars from a shop. Six days after this sighting, his car was found on a wooded hilltop in a remote portion of the county. He was declared legally deceased by a court in 1993.

=== Sports and athletics ===
While Perry County does not currently host any professional or semi-professional athletics teams, historically at least two semi-professional baseball organizations operated in the county. From the 1920s to the late 1940s, both Lobelville and Linden fielded teams, and baseball was considered the prime pastime for residents of the county. It was of such popularity that rivalry games on holidays would be accompanied by noted musical acts, including at least one appearance by Bill Monroe, widely considered the father of bluegrass music. Linden's team, the Owls, won at least three state baseball championships.

Perry County high school athletic teams have achieved some notability in state-wide competitions, especially in basketball. In 1955, Linden High School began a three-year streak of winning the state high school boys' basketball championship. Following Linden High School's consolidation with Lobelville High School, Perry County High School again won boys' basketball state championships in 1976, 1977, and 1997.

== Health and healthcare ==
Perry County is served by a local health department that provides basic healthcare services, including vaccinations, disease testing, primary care, and pediatrics. In addition to services provided by the health department, a small clinic funded by a Rural Health Initiative Grant was constructed in 1979 to provide essential outpatient services in the county.

As of 2019, 14.5% of the county's population under the age of 65 lacked health insurance. Additionally, 15.6% of the population under the age of 65 was disabled.

In November 2020, the sole hospital in the county, Perry Community Hospital in Linden, announced it would be closing temporarily. Shortly prior to this, the hospital had announced cessation of all services except for the emergency room. The hospital did not reopen, however. Prior to its closure, the hospital had over $2 million in accounts payable due. In 2019, the hospital had come under investigation by insurance provider BlueCross BlueShield of Tennessee for over $4.5 million in overpayments due to improper billing practices.

In December, 2024, BradenHealth, a healthcare company specializing in operating struggling rural hospitals, announced that it had acquired Perry Community Hospital. The corporation then began a substantial overhaul and mold remediation in the facility to prep it for re-opening. The hospital was re-opened and began accepting patients in September, 2025.

=== COVID-19 pandemic ===
In June 2020, the first known COVID-19 hospitalization of a Perry County resident was recorded, with the first death reported in October of that year. By the end of 2024, when COVID-19 data reporting ceased, a total of 3,244 cases had been reported with 64 deaths and 68 hospitalizations. As of August 22, 2022, the latest date of available information, 42.8% of the county's population was fully vaccinated against COVID-19. This was nearly 15% below the state-wide vaccination rate.

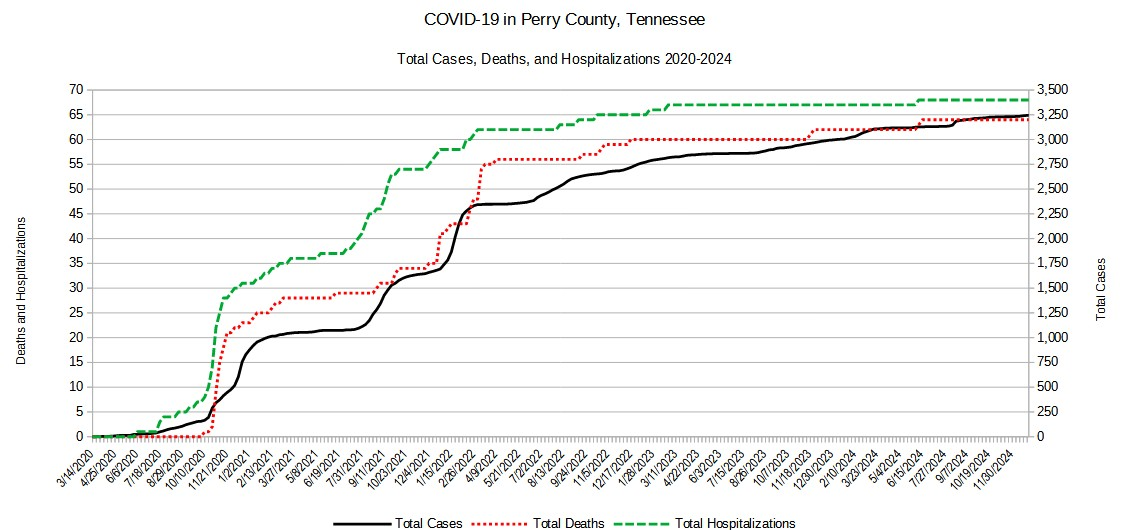
A graph plotting the total number of COVID-19 cases, hospitalizations, and death by week from 2020 to 2024 in Perry County

== Notable people ==
- William Morgan Conder – politician
- McDonald Craig – musician
- Pleas Doyle – politician
- John Allen Greer – politician
- Kelsie B. Harder – professor and onomastician (name scholar)
- Bob Harris – professional basketball player
- Kirk Haston – politician and former professional basketball player
- Paul Lancaster – artist
- Clyde Milan – professional baseball player, manager, and coach with the Washington Senators
- Obediah Pickard – musician
- David Rhodes – educator and athlete
- Thetus W. Sims – politician, member of the United States House of Representatives
- Helen Craig Smith – author and educator
- Andrew H. Wiggs – politician, judge, and newspaper publisher

== See also ==
- List of archaeological sites in Tennessee § Perry County
- List of counties in Tennessee
- National Register of Historic Places listings in Tennessee § Perry County
- Timeline of Perry County, Tennessee history
