= John Anderson =

John Anderson may refer to:

== Arts and entertainment ==
=== Music ===
- John Anderson (jazz trumpeter) (1921–1974), American musician
- Jon Anderson (John Roy Anderson, born 1944), lead singer of the British band Yes
- John Anderson (producer) (1948–2024), Northern Irish composer and producer
- John Anderson (singer) (1954–2026), American country musician
  - John Anderson (album), Anderson's 1980 debut album
- John Anderson, vocalist for the British rock band Charlie (founded 1971)

=== Theater, television and film ===
- John Murray Anderson (1886–1954), Newfoundland-American theater director
- John Anderson (actor) (1922–1992), American actor
- John Anderson (television personality) (1931–2024), Scottish referee on the series Gladiators
- John Anderson (sportscaster) (born 1964 or 1965), American ESPN television sports journalist and co-host of Wipeout
- John H. Anderson (set decorator) (1920–2008), American set decorator
- John Anderson (director) (born 1954), American documentary film director, producer, editor and writer

=== Writing ===
- J. Redwood Anderson (1883–1964), English poet
- John J. Anderson (1956–1989), writer and editor covering computers and technology
- John David Anderson (born 1975), American writer
- John Wesley Anderson (born 1954), American author, public speaker, and law enforcement officer

=== Other arts and entertainment ===
- John Henry Anderson (1814–1874), Scottish magician
- John Alvin Anderson (1869–1948), Swedish-American photographer
- John Cornbread Anderson (active since 1995), American folk artist

== Business ==
- John Anderson (Scottish businessman) (1747–1820), merchant and founder of Fermoy, Ireland
- John Byers Anderson (1817–1897), American educator, military officer and railroad executive, mentor of Andrew Carnegie
- John Macvicar Anderson (1835–1915), Scottish architect
- John Anderson (publisher) (1836–1910), Norwegian-American publisher
- John Anderson (merchant) (1852–1924), Scottish merchant, of Singapore and Eastcote
- John L. Anderson (shipbuilder) (1868–1941) Seattle steamboat pioneer
- Sir John Anderson, 1st Baronet, of Harrold Priory (1878–1963), Scottish haulage contractor
- John E. Anderson (1917–2011), American businessman, namesake of the UCLA Anderson School of Management
- John Anderson (New Zealand businessman, born 1938) (1938–2025), founder of Contiki Holidays and professional public speaker
- Jock R. Anderson (born 1941), Australian agricultural economist
- John Anderson (inventor) (1942–2012), founder, director and chief technology officer of HeartSine Technologies
- John Anderson (New Zealand businessman, born 1945) (1945–2018), chief executive of the ANZ National Bank

== Military ==
- John Wayne Anderson (1805–1866), captain in the Confederate States Army, father of John Wayne Anderson Jr.
- John Wayne Anderson Jr. (1843–1901), captain in the Confederate States Army, son of John Wayne Anderson
- John Byers Anderson (1817–1897), educator, railroad contractor and United States Army officer
- John F. Anderson (general) (1832–1902), American Civil War officer
- John B. Anderson (United States Army officer) (1891–1976), American general
- John W. Anderson (sailor) (1899–1976), Master Mariner and Commodore, United States Lines; Captain, SS United States
- Sir John Anderson (British Army officer, born 1908) (1908–1988), first commander of the Ulster Defence Regiment
- Sir John Anderson (British Army officer, born 1916) (1916–2007), British Army officer
- John Anderson (VC) (1918–1943), English Victoria Cross recipient
- John Rogers Anderson (born 1941), Canadian admiral and ambassador to NATO

== Politics ==
=== Australia ===
- John Gerard Anderson (1836–1911), Scottish-born educationalist and public servant in colonial Queensland
- John Anderson (Australian politician) (born 1956), deputy prime minister and leader of the National Party 1999–2005
- John Anderson (Victorian politician) (1840–1901), member of Victorian Parliament 1894–1901

=== Canada ===
- John Hawkins Anderson (1805–1870), member of the Canadian Senate
- John Anderson (Newfoundland politician) (1855–1930), businessman and politician
- John Anderson (Ontario politician), MPP from 1911 to 1914
- John Victor Anderson (1918–1982), politician in Alberta

=== New Zealand ===
- John Anderson (mayor) (1820–1897), mayor of Christchurch, blacksmith, engineer, businessman
- Crawford Anderson (John Crawford Anderson, c. 1848–1930), politician, MP for Bruce electorate

=== United Kingdom ===
- Sir John Anderson, 1st Baronet, of Mill Hill (c. 1736–1813), British politician, MP for City of London, 1793–1806
- John Anderson (diplomatic writer) (1795–1845), Scottish diplomatic writer
- John Anderson (colonial administrator) (1858–1918), British governor of Straits Settlements and later of Ceylon
- John Anderson, 1st Viscount Waverley (1882–1958), British civil servant and politician
- John Anderson, 3rd Viscount Waverley (born 1949), British peer
- John Anderson (trade unionist), British trade union leader
- John Anderson (civil servant) (1908–1965), Scottish civil servant

=== United States ===
- Jack Z. Anderson (1904–1981), US representative from California
- John Alexander Anderson (1834–1892), US representative from Kansas
- John Anderson (Maine politician) (1792–1853), US representative from Maine
- John Anderson (New Jersey politician) (1665–1736), colonel who served as acting governor of New Jersey in 1736
- John Anderson (Wisconsin politician, born 1870) (1870–1954), state senator
- John Anderson Jr. (1917–2014), governor of Kansas, 1961–1965
- John B. Anderson (1922–2017), US representative from Illinois and 1980 presidential candidate
- John C. Anderson (lawyer) (born 1975), US attorney for the District of New Mexico
- John C. Anderson (Wisconsin politician) (1862 – after 1918), state assemblyman
- John C. Anderson (Pennsylvania politician) (c. 1942–1983), member of Philadelphia city council
- John H. Anderson (Florida politician), state legislator
- John Hope Anderson (1912–2005), politician in Pennsylvania
- John N. Anderson (1864–1936), politician in California
- John T. Anderson (1804–1879), politician in Virginia
- John W. Anderson (politician) (1878–1972), politician in Tennessee
- Johnny Anderson (politician), member of the Utah House of Representatives 2009–2016

== Religion and philosophy ==
- John Anderson (theologian and controversialist) (1668–1721), Scottish theologian
- John Anderson (theologian) (1748–1830), founder of the first Presbyterian seminary in America
- John Anderson (missionary) (1805–1855), Scottish missionary
- John Hendry Anderson (1854–1913), Anglican rector and instigator of Tooting Bec Lido
- John Anderson (archbishop of Moosonee) (1866–1943), Anglican Church of Canada metropolitan bishop
- John Anderson (philosopher) (1893–1962), Scottish–Australian philosopher
- John Mueller Anderson (1914–1999), American philosopher
- John Anderson (bishop of British Columbia) (1912–1969), Anglican Church of Canada bishop
- John R. Anderson (minister) (1818–1863), American founder and minister of African Baptist Churches

== Science ==
- John Anderson (natural philosopher) (1726–1796), Scottish natural philosopher
- John Anderson (physician) (died 1804), English physician
- John Anderson (zoologist) (1833–1900), Scottish zoologist
- John Anderson (engineer, born 1849) (1849–1934), Scottish rugby union player and New Zealand engineer
- John Anderson (Scottish engineer) (1814–1886)
- John F. Anderson (scientist) (1873–1958), director of the United States Hygienic Laboratory
- John August Anderson (1876–1959), American physicist and astronomer
- John Edward Anderson (psychologist) (1893–1966), American psychologist
- John Stuart Anderson (1908–1990), British/Australian inorganic chemist
- John Anderson (pathologist) (1918–2011), British pathologist
- J. Edward Anderson (1927–2026), American engineer
- John Maxwell Anderson (1928–1982), Scottish surgeon and cancer specialist
- John Robert Anderson (chemist) (1928–2007), Australian chemist/materials scientist
- John D. Anderson (born 1937), American aerospace engineer
- John L. Anderson (born 1945), American chemical engineer
- John Robert Anderson (psychologist) (born 1947), Canadian-American psychologist and computer scientist
- John G. Anderson (born 1948), American seismologist

== Sports ==
=== American football ===
- John E. Anderson (American football), college player and coach
- John W. Anderson (American football) (1933–1998), coach
- John Anderson (American football) (born 1956), Green Bay Packers linebacker

=== Association football ===
- John Anderson (footballer, born 1878) (1878 – after 1903), English footballer born in County Durham
- John Anderson (footballer, born 1879) (1879 – after 1900), Scottish footballer born in Rothesay, Argyll and Bute
- John Anderson (footballer, born 1881) (1881–1942), Scottish footballer born in Fowlis Wester, Perthshire
- John Anderson (footballer, born 1915) (1915–1987), Scottish footballer born in Dundee
- John Anderson (footballer, born 1921) (1921–2006), English footballer born in Salford, Lancashire
- John Anderson (footballer, born 1928) (1928–2001), Scottish footballer born in Glasgow
- Johnny Anderson (footballer) (1929–2001), Scottish football goalkeeper born in Barrhead, East Renfrewshire
- John Anderson (footballer, born 1931) (1931–2003), English footballer born in Risdale, Northumberland
- John Anderson (soccer, born 1937) (1937–2021), Scottish-born Australian international footballer
- John Anderson (footballer, born 1959), Republic of Ireland international footballer
- John Anderson (footballer, born 1972), Scottish footballer born in Greenock, Inverclyde
- Jocko Anderson (1893–1960), Canadian soccer and ice hockey player

=== Baseball and cricket ===
- John Anderson (outfielder) (1873–1949), American baseball player
- John Anderson (pitcher) (1929–1998), American baseball player
- John Anderson (baseball coach) (1955–2026), American baseball coach
- John Anderson (cricketer, born 1955), Australian cricketer
- John Anderson (Irish cricketer) (born 1982)

=== Other sports ===
- John Anderson (Australian footballer) (1888–1957), Australian rules footballer
- John Anderson (discus thrower) (1907–1948), American Olympic discus thrower
- John Anderson (runner) (born 1936), British runner
- John Anderson (bowls) (1912 – after 1954), British-South African lawn bowler
- John Anderson (rugby league, born 1913) (1913–1984), New Zealand international
- John Anderson (rugby, born 1918), Scotland international rugby union player, later rugby league player
- John Anderson (canoeist) (1924–2001), American sprint canoer
- John Anderson (ice hockey general manager) (1934–2009), general manager of the Buffalo Sabres
- John Anderson (sailor) (born 1939), Australian sailor
- John Scott Anderson (sailor) (born 1954), Australian sailor
- John Anderson (racing driver) (1944–1986), American driver, known for a crash at Daytona in 1981
- John Anderson (ice hockey, born 1957), Canadian ice hockey player
- John Anderson (equestrian) (born 1966), Canadian Olympic equestrian
- John Anderson (hurler) (born 1978), Irish hurler
- John Anderson (water polo) (born 1962), Canadian water polo player

== Others ==
- John Anderson (carpenter) (1759–1832), Scottish friend of Robert Burns
- John Anderson (engraver) (1775 – before 1809), Scottish engraver
- John Anderson (genealogist, 1789–1832), Scottish genealogist
- John Anderson (genealogist, 1798–1839), Scottish genealogist
- John C. Anderson (judge) (1863–1940), associate justice and chief justice of the Alabama Supreme Court
- John W. Anderson (Iowa judge) (1871–1954), justice of the Iowa Supreme Court
- John Anderson (classicist) (1870–1952), Camden Professor of Ancient History at the University of Oxford
- John Kinloch Anderson (1924–2015), Scottish academic
- John Mathieson Anderson (born 1941), British linguist and Emeritus Professor of English Language at the University of Edinburgh
- John Anderson (escaped slave), American slave who escaped to Canada in the 1860s, leading to a famous extradition case
- John W. Anderson (slave trader) (1801?–1836), Kentucky farmer and interstate trafficker
- John Anderson (tailor), Scottish tailor working in Edinburgh in the 1540s and 1550s

== See also ==
- Jack Anderson (disambiguation)
- John Andersson, Swedish footballer
- John Anderton (disambiguation)
- Jon Anderson (disambiguation)
- Jonathan Anderson (disambiguation)
