= John R. Anderson =

John R. Anderson may refer to:

- John R. Anderson (minister) (1818–1863), founder and minister of African Baptist Churches
- John Robert Anderson (chemist) (1928–2007), Australian chemist/materials scientist
- John Robert Anderson (psychologist) (born 1947), Canadian psychologist and computer scientist
- John Rogers Anderson (born 1941), Canadian admiral and ambassador to NATO
- John Roy Anderson, known as Jon Anderson (born 1944), lead singer of the British band Yes

== See also ==
- John Anderson (disambiguation)
