= John A. Anderson =

John A. Anderson may refer to:

- John A. Anderson (American football) (1933–1998), college football coach
- John A. Anderson (Oregon politician), member of the Oregon Territorial Legislature, 1851
- John Alexander Anderson (1834–1892), Representative from Kansas
- John August Anderson (1876–1959), physicist/astronomer
- John Alvin Anderson (1869–1948), photographer and maker of Indian views

== See also ==
- John Anderson (disambiguation)
