= John T. Anderson =

American politician

Member of the Virginia House of Delegates from the Botetourt district
- In office December 3, 1827 – December 4, 1831 Serving with Fleming B. Miller, Thomas Shanks
- Preceded by: James L. Allen
- Succeeded by: William Anderson

Member of the Virginia Senate from the Allegheny, Bath, Botetourt, Pocahontas district
- In office December 1, 1834 – December 4, 1842
- Preceded by: Charles Beale
- Succeeded by: John McCauley

Member of the Virginia House of Delegates from the Botetourt and Craig district
- In office December 5, 1859 – March 15, 1865 Serving with James McDowell, Green James
- Preceded by: F.H. Mays
- Succeeded by: William Anderson

Personal details
- Born: 1804 Botetourt County, Virginia, U.S.
- Died: 1879 (aged 74–75) Virginia, U.S.
- Education: Washington College
- Occupation: Lawyer, industrialist

John Thomas Anderson (April 5, 1804 – August 27, 1879) was a nineteenth-century American lawyer, iron manufacturer and politician who served in both chambers of the Virginia General Assembly, representing Botetourt and nearby counties.

== Early life ==
Anderson was born in 1804 at Walnut Hill plantation in Botetourt County, Virginia to William Anderson and his wife, the former Anne Thomas. His father had moved into the Appalachian mountains from Delaware to mine and manufacture iron, and also operated the Walnut Hill plantation using enslaved labor. The family included ten children, including six sons, of which John and his brothers Gen. Joseph Reid Anderson and Judge Francis Thomas Anderson would become prominent. Like his father, John Anderson was active in the local Presbyterian church, serving on the vestry for more than 25 years, as well as on the board of the Fincastle Academy. He was educated at Washington College 1845-53.

Despite a fiery temper, Anderson married widow Cassandra Shanks Patton, and helped raise her three sons as well as at least two Shanks nephews. However, their only child to reach adulthood, Joseph Washington Anderson (1836-1863), enlisted in the Confederate States Army, became an artillery officer and died in Mississippi in May 1863, although not before he married Miss Anna Morris of Louisa County and sired children who would survive their grandparents.

== Career ==
The Virginia Capitol at Richmond VA where 19th century Conventions met

As an adult, Anderson began his law practice in Fincastle, the county seat of Botetourt County. It and the family's ironworks were successful, so that Anderson was able to purchase a plantation, Mt. Joy, near Buchanan, Virginia around 1840, shortly after their father's death. After his brother Joseph moved to Richmond in 1841 and introduced slave labor at the Tredegar Ironworks (buying the corporation several years later), John Anderson sent semi-processed iron ingots from Botetourt county to supply that early factory, which became the most important ironworks in the south. In the 1850 federal census, John T. Anderson owned 31 enslaved people in Botetourt County's Western District. Another brother, Francis Anderson, moved to Rockbridge County and likewise established an ironworks there circa 1850.

Botetourt County's voters several times selected John Anderson as one of their representatives. Despite losing some elections as well, he served in the Virginia House of Delegates and the Virginia Senate for more than two decades. In 1834, voters from Botetourt as well as nearby Allegheny, Bath and Pocahontas Counties elected him to the state senate, with Roanoke County being added to the list of included counties in 1839, as he won re-election. However, he failed to win re-election to the state Senate in 1843, but in 1850, Botetourt's voters (along with those of neighboring Roanoke, Alleghany and Bath Counties elected Anderson as one of their three delegates to the Virginia Constitutional Convention of 1850, alongside Fleming B. Miller and William Watts. He again won election to the House of Delegates representing Botetourt and Craig Counties in 1859, serving alongside James McDowell

In the months preceding the American Civil War, unlike his brother Francis, John Anderson became a prominent secessionist, and as a member of the Committee on Military Affairs from 1860 to 1861 prepared for hostilities. He also represented Botetourt and Craig Counties in the House of Delegates throughout the war, alongside Green James. Union General David Hunter raided Botetourt County in mid-1863 and burned this Anderson's manor house, Mt. Joy, to the ground, but allowed Anderson's wife an hour to gather her most important possessions and leave. Their only son Joseph would join the Confederate Army after graduating from the Virginia Military Institute, as would Francis' son William. Joseph Anderson died in Mississippi and William Anderson would be discharged because of his war wounds in 1863—but then studied at the University of Virginia, and became a lawyer who led efforts against Congressional Reconstruction in Lynchburg, Virginia, helped rebuild the Democratic party and would serve in the Virginia Constitutional Convention of 1901 which stripped African American and poor Virginians of many rights. Ironically, the son of the Mt. Joy overseer, William Nace, who enlisted in the 22nd Virginia Infantry and who missed the Battle of Gettysburg to attend to his dying father, would become one of the last surviving Confederate veterans in that area, and his modern descendants would revisit the rebuilt Mt. Joy estate.

== Death ==
John T. Anderson died in Virginia in August, 1879.

The University of Virginia library maintains the Anderson family papers in its special collections.

== Bibliography ==
- Pulliam, David Loyd (1901). The Constitutional Conventions of Virginia from the foundation of the Commonwealth to the present time. John T. West, Richmond. ISBN 978-1-2879-2059-5.
