= William M. Peyton =

American politician

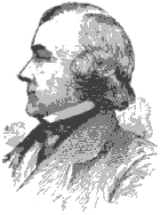

Member of the Virginia House of Delegates from the Botetourt district
- In office December 7, 1838 – December 1, 1839 Serving with Thomas Shanks
- Preceded by: George W. Wilson
- Succeeded by: Joseph Hannah

Personal details
- Born: September 4, 1804 Montgomery County, Virginia, U.S.
- Died: February 16, 1868 (aged 63) Montgomery County, Virginia, U.S.
- Resting place: Thornrose cemetery, Staunton, Virginia
- Party: Whig
- Spouse: Susan Taylor
- Education: Princeton University; Yale University
- Occupation: attorney, politician

Military service
- Allegiance: Confederate States of America

William Madison Peyton (September 4, 1804 – February 16, 1868) was a Virginia lawyer, politician and slave owner who began developing what would become the coal country of Virginia and West Virginia in the 1840s. Peyton sympathized with the Confederate States of America and died financially ruined shortly after the war's end.

== Early and family life ==
Born in Montgomery County where his mother, the former Susanna Strother Madison (1780-1830) was traveling and visiting relatives, William M. Peyton was descended on both sides to several of the First Families of Virginia. His father, John H. Peyton (1778-1847; the middle name various given as Howe, Howzee or Howson) of Montgomery Hall had married his wife in 18xx, but she would die while William was fifteen, and his sister Mary Preston Peyton Gray was three. Their father would remarry in 1824, to Anne Montgomery Lewis (daughter of Major John Lewis of Sweet Springs plantation), and their half-brother, lawyer John Lewis Peyton would represent the state of North Carolina in Europe during the American Civil War and eventually write a biography of his elder half-brother.

William M. Peyton's maternal grandfather was William Preston of Smithfield plantation in Montgomery County, and his mother was also related to President James Madison and Episcopal bishop James Madison. Peyton was also related to Senator John Brown of Kentucky, Vice President John C. Breckinridge, Virginia governors James McDowell and James Patton Preston, South Carolina's William Campbell Preston and Missouri governor Benjamin Howard, as well as numerous U.S. Congressmen and state legislators. His lawyer father, John H. Peyton, son of John R. Peyton, first practiced law in Fredericksburg, Virginia and Spotsylvania County, as he lived at the Stony Hill plantation where he had been raised, but in 1808, he became the prosecutor for Augusta County, Virginia, having moved his family to his wife's neighborhood (what was then the frontier). The elder Peyton then practiced law for the rest of his life in the Shenandoah Valley and Blue Ridge Mountain area of the Commonwealth, including representing former Virginia governor and U.S. President Thomas Jefferson in several lawsuits including concerning the Rivanna canal. His father also followed the example of several paternal relatives and volunteered for military service during the War of 1812, serving as an aide to Brig. Gen. Robert Porterfield.

William Peyton attended Staunton Academy beginning when he was 12, then Princeton University (his father's alma mater) beginning in 1822, but was forced to withdraw for health reasons (and refused to accept the degree later offered him). In 1823 he began studies at Yale University, and graduated the following year. While at Yale, he befriended E. Boyden, who would marry and settle in Staunton as the rector of historic Trinity Episcopal Church.

On March 6, 1826, William Peyton married Sally Anne Eliza Taylor (1807-1881), a friend since childhood and the heiress daughter of Chancellor Allen Taylor, with fellow lawyer (musician and occasional future delegate) Chapman Johnson as best man. The couple soon had daughters Elizabeth Thompson Peyton and Susan Madison Peyton, and would ultimately have ten children, most of whom predeceased their father.

== Career ==
Upon reaching legal age, Peyton inherited land and slaves in Virginia and Kentucky from his mother (that his father had managed during his minority), and became a wealthy man, and richer yet after his advantageous marriage. Despite his disinclination for legal practice and preference for traveling and the arts, Peyton followed his father's direction and began reading for the bar in 1824. He soon decided to make a grand tour of courts in the U.S. and Canada to study comparative legal practices. While in Tallahassee, Florida, he became sick with a fever and nearly died, and as a favor to the free black man who nursed him back to health, bought the man's sweetheart (whom he had feared would soon be sold westward) so they could marry.

Peyton returned home to his peripatetic legal practice, from which he would retire a number of years later because of continuing health problems. He moved from Staunton to Hot Springs in Bath County, Virginia after his marriage, because his wife had inherited that lucrative and health-promoting property (which he would sell for $300,000 in 1864). Nonetheless, Peyton continued his legal career. Admitted to the Virginia bar in 1826, he began a legal practice in Augusta, Bath, Pocahontas and surrounding counties. During his travels, Peyton met General Andrew Jackson, whom he would later support politically (and even stay as a guest in the White House in 1831), to his father's consternation. President Jackson wanted to appoint Peyton as U.S. Attorney for the Western District of Virginia in 1832, but Peyton declined for health reasons and instead supported his less-wealthy friend Harrison for the office. Peyton also declined appointment as secretary to the delegation to France led by William Cabell Rives, whom he would later support politically.

When the climate at the hot springs failed to improve his health after about three years, Peyton sold some property and bought an estate along the Roanoke River then in Botetourt County from Dr. Samuel Goode of Mecklenburg County. Peyton and his family would reside there until 1858 (except for a period developing coal properties as discussed below). He became known throughout the area for his kindness and hospitality, until he sold "Elmwood" in 1858 and moved to New York City.

Botetourt County voters elected Peyton to represent them (part-time) as one of Botetourt County's two representatives in the Virginia House of Delegates in 1836 on a ticket alongside Thomas Shanks, and he was re-elected once, although the following year a census realignment cut the county's representation to just one man, Joseph Hannah. In 1837, Peyton was elected to the vestry of St. Mark's Episcopal Church in Fincastle, the Botetourt County seat, but soon Roanoke County was created from Botetourt County, and Peyton's residence was in the new county. Peyton also served as a local magistrate and sought to improve agricultural practices and well as improve local roads and bring other internal improvements to the area. At the same time that Peyton ran to represent Botetourt County, his father John H. Peyton was elected to the Virginia state senate representing Augusta and Rockbridge Counties, after surrendering his position as that area's commonwealth's attorney (which he had held for nearly three decades).

As Botetourt's representative in the Virginia General Assembly, as well as an advocate for the interests of Western Virginia, Peyton offended Thomas Ritchie, originally from Tidewater Essex County, Virginia and who held considerable political clout as publisher of the Richmond Enquirer. Richie supported Fleming Bowyer Miller (much to the disgust of George Mayse of Bath County) and Prichard, who defeated Peyton and Shanks. Peyton thereafter declined his friends' entreaties that he run for higher political office, such as Congress or Governor of Virginia.

Instead, Peyton needed to adjust his finances after spending freely and entertaining considerably during the previous years. He bought 30,000 acres in Boone County which had coal deposits, and invested about $100,000 of his own funds trying to make the Coal River navigable. Peyton also accepted a gubernatorial appointment as the state's representative on the James River and Kanahwa Canal company, which could transport the coal to market once mines were developed. Peyton continued to promote internal improvements and other principles of the Whig Party and Sen. Henry Clay, whom he admired. In 1850, Peyton traveled to the Virginia Constitutional Convention to advocate for aid to education. Un that census year, he owned 59 enslaved people in Roanoke alone, and other slaves in Boone County (Virginia state census records not being available online). Upon moving to New York, the Peytons lived in a household with their children, a governess and several servants in the 3rd district of the 19th ward. He owned five enslaved black people in Boone County: a 72-year-old man, 55 and 30-year-old women an 11-year-old girl and 10-year-old boy.

After the election of President Abraham Lincoln, Peyton wrote his friend Rives on January 8, 1861, concerning the secession movement (which Rives had published), and Peyton ultimately supported the Southern cause. Federal spies kept watch on Peyton, who had been living and conducting coal-related business in New York City when Virginia seceded. Federal officials refused to let Peyton return to the South without giving a written promise that he would not aid the Confederate States of America, which he refused to give, instead writing and publishing another letter to Mr. Rives on May 15, 1861, which foresaw the damage to Virginia during the war but rallied to her side.

Although his plans to escape New York for first Europe and then Mexico were foiled, after the Confederate defeats at Philippi and Rich Mountain (which led to the creation of West Virginia), Peyton managed to escape to Montreal, Quebec, Canada, from which he made his way back through Toledo, Ohio and Indiana, thence to Kentucky, East Tennessee and ultimately home to Virginia, although his health had been shattered. He bought an estate, "Alta Vista", in Albemarle County where he resided during his final years. During the Civil War, Peyton tried to protect his family and estate, as well as assist the more destitute, but by war's end his health and finances were broken. After his death, his family had to sell his remaining properties. At war's end Peyton professed to prefer a course of "sullen, defiant obstinacy" to Congressional Reconstruction.

== Death ==
On January 25, 1868, Peyton arrived at the Montgomery County home of his brother in law Alexander P. Eskridge, having just witnessed the death of his son-in-law Walter Preston in Abingdon. Preston was the second of his sons-in-law to die, and Peyton had also lost a son, another son-in-law and three daughters during the war years, although William M. Peyton Jr. (1839-1901) would survive the war and marry in 1870. William M. Peyton suffered a stroke two days later and died on February 16, 1868, survived by his wife. Although initially interred at the Eskridge family cemetery, his remains were expected to be returned to a graveyard with more of his family. They currently rest at Staunton's Thornrose Cemetery.

During his lifetime, a town in Boone County was named Peytona for him, to honor his ownership and development of coal lands there. His former estate Elmwood, burned down in 1870, and ultimately became Roanoke's Elmwood Park, a concert venue although many of the elm and other trees Peyton planted still survived.
