= John Anderton =

John Anderton may refer to:

- John Anderton (footballer) (1933–2019), English footballer
- John Anderton (athlete) (1929–1991), South African sprinter
- John Anderton, known as Jack Anderton, English rugby union and rugby league player
- John C. Anderton, author of Birds of South Asia: The Ripley Guide
- John Anderton, the fictional lead character in the film Minority Report

== See also ==
- John Anderson (disambiguation)
