= Thomas Shanks (politician) =

American politician

Member of the Virginia House of Delegates from the Botetourt district
- In office December 7, 1829 – December 5, 1830 Serving with John T. Anderson
- Preceded by: Fleming B. Miller
- Succeeded by: Fleming B. Miller

Member of the Virginia House of Delegates from the Botetourt district
- In office January 1, 1838 – December 2, 1839 Serving with William M. Peyton
- Preceded by: Fleming B. Miller
- Succeeded by: Joseph Hannah
- Succeeded by: Fleming B. Miller

Personal details
- Born: July 15, 1796 Fincastle, Virginia, U.S.
- Died: May 7, 1849 (aged 52) Fincastle, Virginia, U.S.

Thomas Shanks (July 15, 1796 – May 7, 1849) was an American politician who won three elections to represent Botetourt County in the Virginia House of Delegates.

== Early and family life ==
Born near what would become Amsterdam, Virginia, Thomas Shanks was the son of the former Hannah Morrison and her husband David Shanks. Thomas Shanks survived two wives. He married Grace Metcalfe Thomas (1795–1833) in 1825, and she bore two daughters and a son who survived their parents. Five years after her death, Thomas Shanks married widow Mary T. Harvey Kyle (1797–1845) on June 16, 1838, but had no further children in the seven years before her death.

== Career ==
Botetourt County voters first elected Shanks to represent them (part-time) as one of Botetourt County's two representatives in the Virginia House of Delegates in 1829. He temporarily unseated veteran politician and lawyer Fleming B. Miller and served alongside lawyer and manufacturer John T. Anderson, who would become a veteran legislator. Nearly a decade later, in 1837, Botetourt County voters elected Shanks once again as one of their delegates, this time alongside Whig and fellow slaveowner William M. Peyton, and re-elected both men that fall, although the following year a census realignment cut the county's representation to just one man, Joseph Hannah.

== Death ==
Thomas Shanks died on May 7, 1849 (aged 52) and is buried at the Fincastle Presbyterian Church cemetery. His son, Rev. David William Shanks (1830–1894), would receive a degree from Washington College, become a minister in Rockbridge County and later in Danville, survive the American Civil War and likewise marry twice. Thomas Shanks' two daughters who survived him were: Grace Ellen Shanks Glasgow (1826–1897) (second wife of William A. Glasgow and both of whose sons would graduate from Washington and Lee University and become lawyers) and Eliza Cassandra Shanks McPheeters (1827–1872). Rev. D.W. Shanks neither owned slaves nor enlisted in the military, and in addition to his sons Lewis and David Shanks, had three long-lived but unmarried daughters: Margaret Cabell Shanks (1867–1935), Eliza McPheeters Shanks (1868–1938) and Juliet Irvine Shanks (1869–1958).
