= PS Comet =

First commercial steamboat in Europe

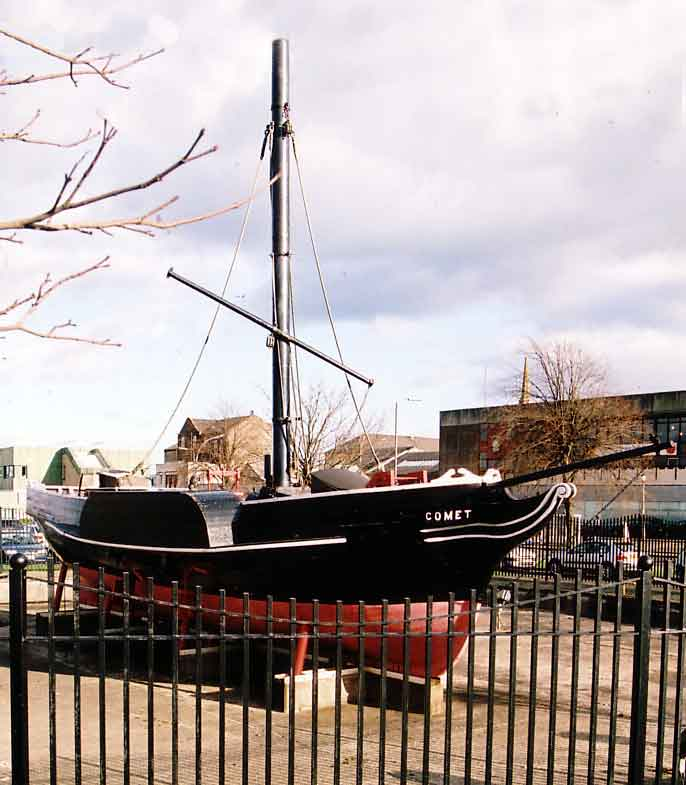
- Replica of PS Comet in Port Glasgow town centre, showing the elongated paddle boxes over the two paddle wheels on each side.

History

Scotland
- Name: Comet
- Owner: Henry Bell
- Launched: 24 July 1812
- Maiden voyage: August 1812
- Out of service: 21 December 1820
- Fate: Wrecked in strong currents at Craignish Point near Oban. Subsequently rebuilt as a schooner, sank February 1875

General characteristics
- Tonnage: 28 ton
- Length: 45 ft (14 m)
- Beam: 10 ft (3.0 m)
- Propulsion: Steam

PS (paddle steamer) Comet was built in 1812 for Henry Bell, a Scottish engineer who with his wife had become proprietor of the Baths Hotel offering sea bathing in Helensburgh. On 15 August 1812, Bell's ship began a passenger service on the River Clyde, connecting Helensburgh to Greenock and Glasgow. This was the first commercially successful steamboat service in Europe. Bell obtained the engine from John Robertson of Glasgow, and the ship was built for him by John and Charles Wood of Port Glasgow.

== History ==
Henry Bell had become interested in steam-propelled boats, and to learn from the Charlotte Dundas venture corresponded with Robert Fulton, who got the North River Steamboat (also known as the Clermont) into operation in 1807 as the first commercially successful steamboat.

In the winter of 1811/1812 Bell got John and Charles Wood of John Wood and Company, shipbuilders of Port Glasgow, to build a paddle steamer which was named Comet, named after the "Great Comet" of 1811. The 28 ton burthen craft had a deck 43.5 feet (13.3 m) long with a beam of 11.25 feet (3.43 m). It had two paddle wheels on each side, driven by a single-cylinder engine rated at 3 to 4 horsepower (2 to 3 kilowatts). The engine was made by John Robertson of Glasgow, and the boiler by David Napier, Camlachie, Glasgow (a story has it that they were evolved from an experimental little steam engine which Bell installed to pump sea water into the Helensburgh Baths). The funnel was tall and thin, serving as a mast, with a yard, allowing it to support a square sail when there was a following wind. A small cabin aft had wooden seats in front of concealed beds and a table. Comet was reported as "brightly painted, having for her figurehead a lady garbed in all the colours of the rainbow".

Comet was launched on 24 July 1812 with her trial run on 6 August from Port Glasgow to the Broomielaw in Glasgow, taking three and a half hours for the 20 miles (32 kilometres). (Note: Some sources have the launching in 1811 and 18 January 1812 for a trial trip) The double paddlewheels were found to be unsatisfactory and a pair of single wheels were substituted which increased her speed to almost 7 knots.

On 15 August 1812, Bell advertised in a local newspaper "The Greenock Advertiser", that the Comet would begin a regular passenger service from that day, a distance of 25 miles (40 kilometres) each way.

The Steamboat Comet Between Glasgow, Greenock and Helensburgh for Passengers Only
The subscriber, having at much expense, fitted up a handsome vessel to ply upon the River Clyde from Glasgow, to sail by the power of air, wind, and steam, intends that the vessel shall leave the Broomielaw on Tuesdays, Thursdays, and Saturdays about mid-day, or such hour thereafter as may answer from the state of the tide, and to leave Greenock on Mondays, Wednesdays, and Fridays in the morning to suit the tide.

On 15 August Comet made the first commercial sailing from Glasgow for Bowling, Helensburgh and Greenock, opening the era of the steamboat on the Clyde, and more widely in Britain and Europe. The fare was "four shillings for the best cabin, and three shillings for the second." As the vessel clearly had no cabins in the modern sense it is unclear what this meant.

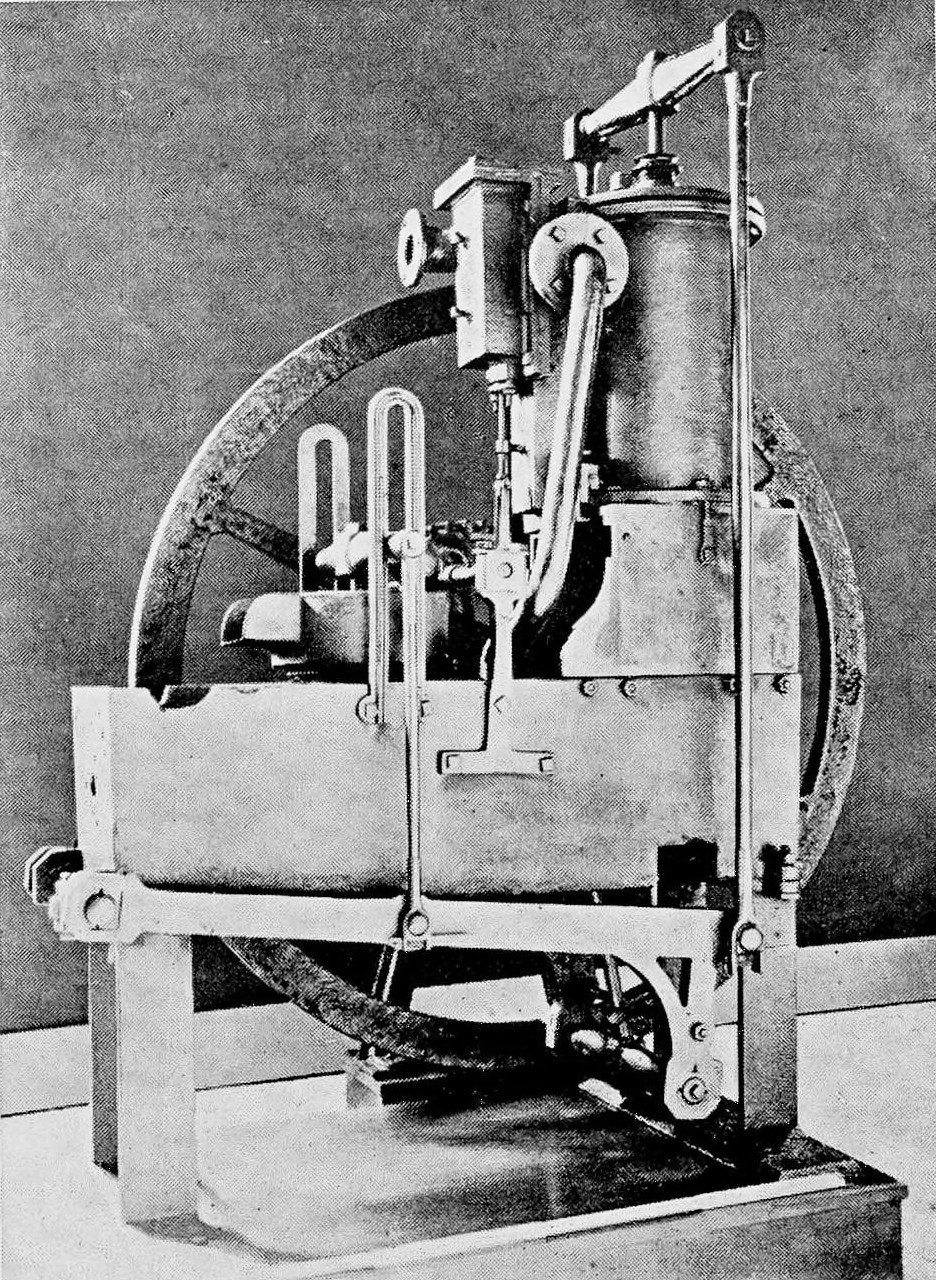
The original engine of Comet

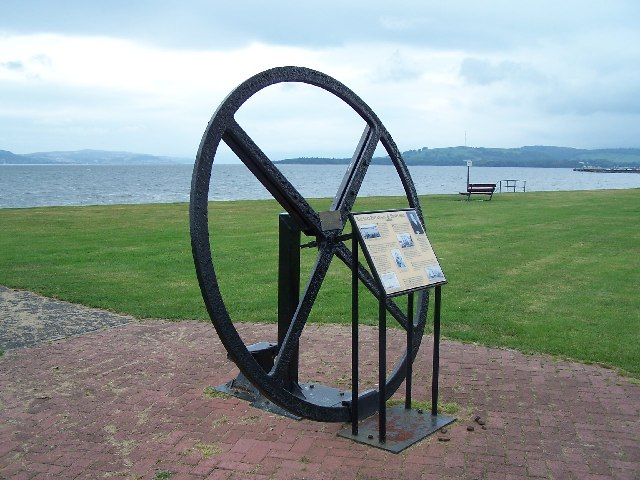
Flywheel from Comet on East Esplanade Helensburgh

The success of this service quickly inspired competition, with services down the Firth of Clyde and the sea lochs to Largs, Rothesay, Campbeltown and Inveraray within four years, and the Comet was outclassed by newer steamers. Bell briefly tried a service on the Firth of Forth.

== Famous passengers ==
- Sir Walter Scott
- James Watt (in 1816, visiting his home town of Greenock in old age) – by this date Bell offered a return trip from Glasgow to Rothesay on the same day which Watt undertook.

== Wreck ==
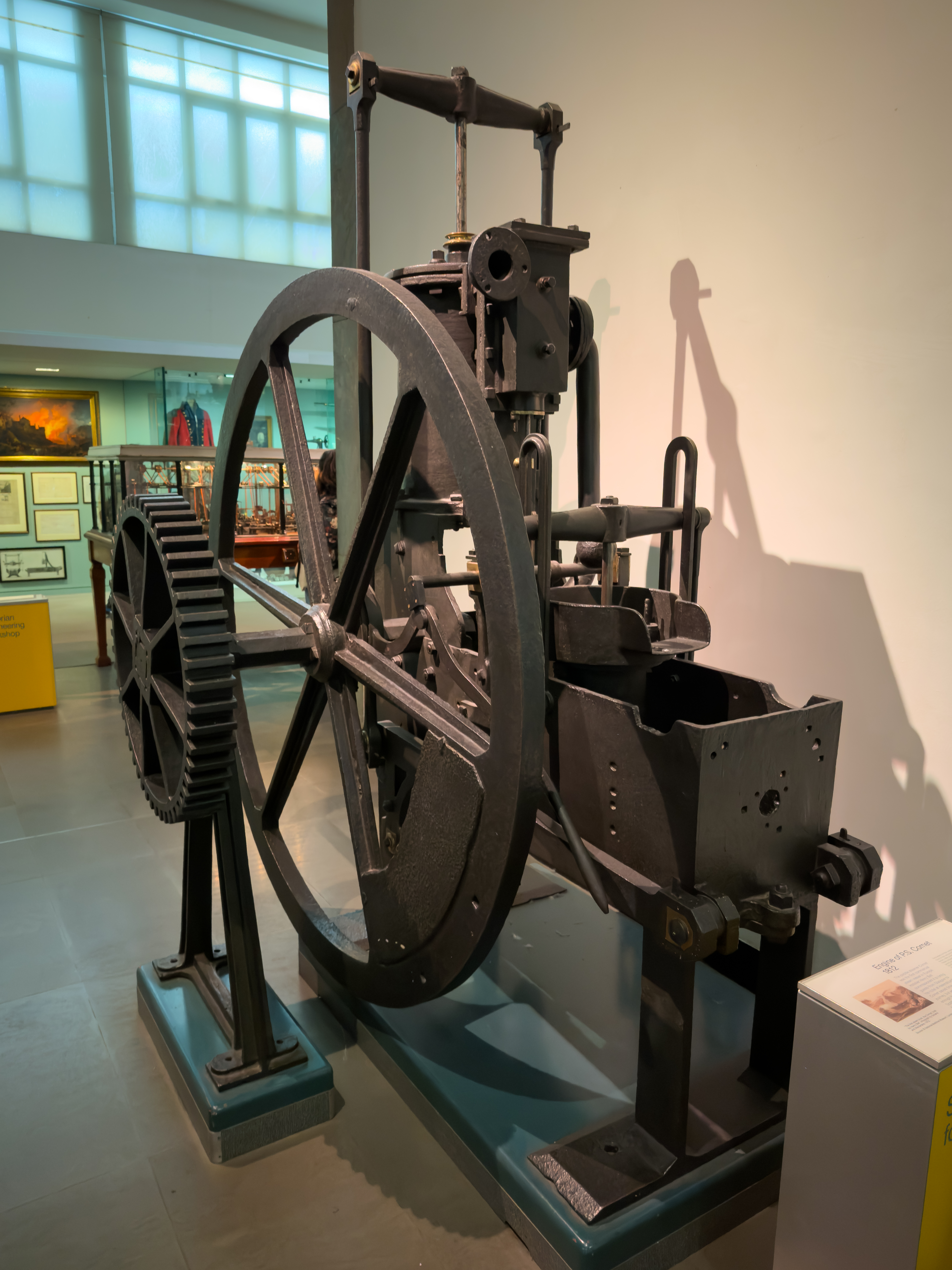
Engine at the Science Museum, London

Bell had the Comet lengthened and re-engined, and from September 1819 ran a service to Oban and Fort William (via the Crinan Canal), a trip which took four days. On 15 December 1820 the Comet was wrecked in strong currents at Craignish Point near Oban, with Bell on board. There were no deaths. One of the engines ended its working days in a Greenock brewery, and is now in The Science Museum in London.

== Fate ==
In 1875, the schooner Ann was driven against a steamship at Greenock, Renfrewshire and sank. The Glasgow Herald reported a piece from the Greenock Telegraph which stated "part of the hull of the Ann was all that was left of Henry Bell's old Comet, the first steam-vessel ever to sail in European waters. Some years ago she was bought up by Smillie, of Glasgow, and Bell's old engine taken out. She was lengthened, made a schooner, and was run on the Larne trade, where she was at great favourite, and was familiarly called the 'Long Ann'. Some time since she was burnt down to the waters edge, but her hull was so good, and she was such a favourite with her owners, that they hauled her into dock and fitted her. The curious thing is, that having been built at Port-Glasgow 63 years ago, and undergoing many vicissitudes, she should, like an old weather-beaten sailor, end her days almost at the threshold of her own home."

== Comet II ==
Bell built another vessel, Comet II, but on 21 October 1825 she collided with the steamer Ayr off Kempock Point, Gourock, Scotland.

The Ayr, we learn, had a light out upon her bow, but the Comet had none. As the night, however, was clear, it is obvious that a bad look out had been kept up, and most reprehensible neglect shown on both sides. At the moment the accident took place, those on the deck of the Comet were, it is said, engaged in dancing. The passengers who were below were in high spirits, amusing themselves telling and listening to diverting tales. The first stroke hit about the paddle of the Comet. The Captain and passengers immediately ran upon deck to see what was wrong; when – the next fatal stroke took place with such force, that the Comet filled, and in two minutes went down head foremost. The moment this look place, the Ayr, instead of lending any assistance, gave her paddles a back stroke, turned round, and went off to Greenock, leaving them to their fate.

— The Sydney Gazette and New South Wales Advertiser, 25 Mar 1826, p3

Comet II sank very quickly, killing 62 of the estimated 80 passengers on board, including the son-in-law of John Anderson, a friend of Robert Burns. Also drowned were recently married Captain Wemyss Erskine Sutherland of the 33rd Regiment and Sarah née Duff of Muirtown. After the loss of his second ship, Bell abandoned his work on steam navigation.

== Replicas ==
=== First replica ===
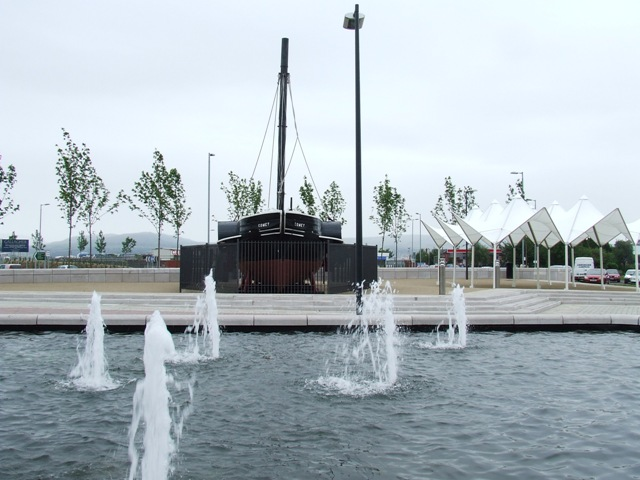
Replica at Port Glasgow

A replica of the Comet, situated in Port Glasgow, was built by Lithgows shipyard apprentices in 1962 for the 150th anniversary of the original. As part of the anniversary celebrations the replica sailed from Port Glasgow to Helensburgh and back, accompanied by a flotilla of small ships.

In 2011, just before the original's 200th anniversary, the replica was restored by a partnership of Inverclyde Council, Ferguson Shipbuilders and an organisation called The Trust. The restoration cost £180,000.

A survey and condition report was commissioned by Inverclyde Council and reported back in 2019. The survey found that the wooden hull of the replica is in such bad condition that it is beyond economic repair, and recommended that the machinery be removed and placed in a new hull.

In April 2023, the replica ship was dismantled and the woodwork scrapped by Inverclyde Council. No trace of the replica ship remains at the site.

=== Second replica ===
A new replica was unveiled in June 2026. Unlike its predecessor, which was a working vessel, the new version is designed to be a long-term static display. It has a stainless steel structure with drainage channels to prevent water damage, and is clad it with a modified timber that is resistant to rot.

== Notes ==
New replica in place now

== Bibliography ==
- Clyde Pleasure Steamers Ian McCrorie, Orr, Pollock & Co. Ltd., Greenock, ISBN 1-869850-00-9
