= Pleas Doyle =

American politician

Pleas Ethan Doyle

Member of the Tennessee House of Representatives from the 20th floterial district
- In office 1938–1940
- Preceded by: John W. Anderson
- Succeeded by: Hamilton H. Parks
- In office 1951–1951
- Preceded by: William Morgan Conder
- Succeeded by: Tom Larkin

Personal details
- Born: July 12, 1900 Perry County, Tennessee, U.S.
- Died: September 15, 1984 (aged 84) Linden, Tennessee, U.S.
- Resting place: Weems Cemetery, Perry County, Tennessee
- Party: Democratic Party (United States)
- Profession: Politician, businessman

Pleas Doyle (July 12, 1900 – September 15, 1984) was an American politician, member of the Tennessee House of Representatives, and businessman who lived in Linden, Tennessee. Doyle represented the 20th Floterial District comprising Perry County and Humphreys County during the 76th Tennessee General Assembly in 1951.
