= St Martin's Church, Ruislip =

Coordinates: 51°34′36″N 0°25′34″W

St Martin's Church
- Parish Church of St Martin
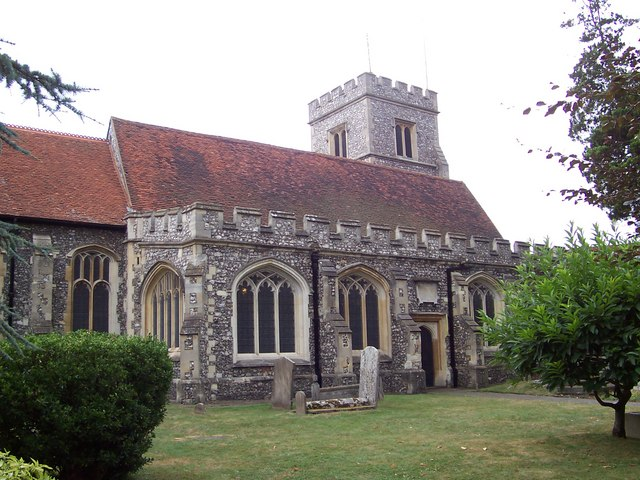
- View of the southern side of St Martin's Church
- St Martin's Church
- Country: England
- Denomination: Church of England
- Churchmanship: Anglo-Catholic
- Website: stmartins-ruislip.org

History
- Dedication: Saint Martin
- Consecrated: 1245

Architecture
- Heritage designation: Grade I - Listing 1285697
- Style: Norman
- Years built: 1245

Administration
- Diocese: Diocese of London
- Archdeaconry: Archdeaconry of Northolt
- Deanery: Deanery of Hillingdon
- Parish: Parish of Ruislip

Clergy
- Bishop: Bishop of Willesden
- Vicar: Rev Dr Robert Chapman

St Martin's Church is a church in the west London town of Ruislip, within the London Borough of Hillingdon. It has been designated since January 1950 by English Heritage as a Grade I listed building. The present chancel and nave date back to the 13th century. The church stands at the northern end of Ruislip High Street, near the Manor Farm site.

== History ==
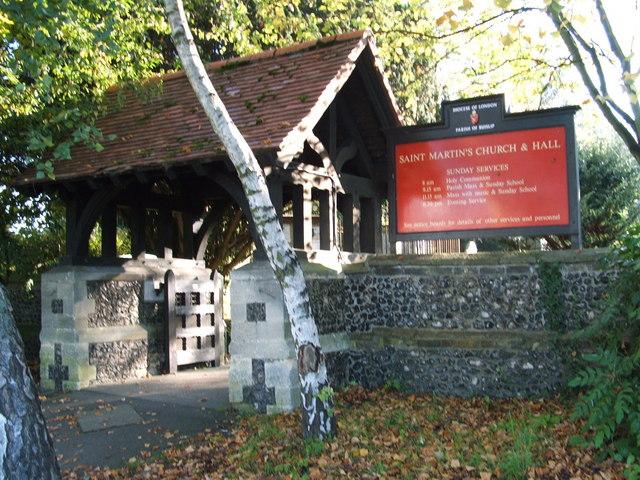
Entrance gate to St Martin's Church

A church for Ruislip appears in the 1086 Domesday Book but is believed to have been replaced by the present church in 1245, when an increase in the parish population called for a larger building. Stones with markings from the Norman period have been found in the grounds, believed to be from the original building.

While Ruislip was under the ownership of the Bec Abbey, the monks bestowed the name St. Martin upon the church, dedicating it to Saint Martin of Tours from Normandy.

The Proctor-General of the Bec Abbey, William de Guineville, is believed to have insisted upon the rebuilding of the church. He had held the position since 1242 and lived in the priory at Manor Farm. The first recorded vicar of the church was William de Berminton in 1327.

Between 1404 and 1414, the Bec Abbey lost its lands following heavy taxation during the Hundred Years War. By 1422, the condition of the building had deteriorated, at which point it was given to the Dean and Canons of Windsor. They had the chancel built later in the 15th century, while the parishioners themselves rebuilt the south aisle in 1440. The church tower was also built in the 15th century with a set of bells. Thomas Bettz left £26 13 4d in his will in 1463 to pay for the repair of the bells. An extension to the south aisle was added in 1500.

In 1870, the church building was substantially restored by the architect George Gilbert Scott.

In 1958, the rood beam was added as a memorial to the local Gower family.

The Ruislip war memorial dedicated to those killed in the First World War was moved from its original position in the church graveyard in 1976, to be near the entrance to Manor Farm.

On 29 June 2021, the PCC of St Martin’s passed a resolution under the House of Bishops' Declaration. The resolution was re-affirmed by a vote of the PCC on 23 November 2021 but rescinded on 27 April 2022.

== Notable memorials ==
- Lady Mary Bankes (or Banckes), defender of Corfe Castle against the Parliamentarians in the English Civil War, who was born in Ruislip
- John Anderson (1852–1924), Scottish merchant
- Elisabeth Schumann (1888–1952), German opera and lieder singer
- Jessie Matthews (1907–1981), British film and stage entertainer
