= William Morgan Conder =

American politician

Member of the Tennessee House of Representatives from the Humphreys County and Perry County floterial district
- In office November 5, 1946 – February 8, 1947
- Preceded by: John W. Anderson
- Succeeded by: Pleas Doyle

Personal details
- Born: February 1, 1897 Linden, Tennessee, U.S.
- Died: February 8, 1947 (aged 50) Linden, Tennessee, U.S.
- Resting place: Weems Cemetery, Perry County, Tennessee
- Party: Democratic Party (United States)
- Spouse: Alma Mae Starbuck
- Children: 3
- Profession: Politician, businessman

William Morgan "Morg" Conder (February 1, 1897 – February 8, 1947) was an American politician, member of the Tennessee House of Representatives, businessman, and amateur athlete from Perry County, Tennessee. Conder represented a floterial district comprising Perry County and Humphreys County for a partial term, dying while in office. Prior to holding office in the legislature, Conder served six years as Perry County trustee and a term as mayor of the town of Linden, Tennessee. Conder married Alma Mae Starbuck on May 6, 1917, and was the father of three daughters. In addition to his political activities, he operated a Chevrolet dealership in Linden.
