= Harry Smith (footballer, born 1932) =

English footballer

Personal information
- Full name: Harry Arthur Smith
- Date of birth: 10 October 1932
- Place of birth: Wolverhampton, England
- Date of death: 29 December 2016 (aged 84)
- Place of death: Torquay, Devon, England
- Position: Left back

Youth career
- –1953: West Bromwich Albion

Senior career*
Years	Team	Apps	(Gls)
1953–1961	Torquay United	188	(1)
1961	Bristol City	1	(0)
- * Club domestic league appearances and goals

Harry Arthur Smith (10 October 1932 – 29 December 2016) was an English professional footballer who played as a full back in the Football League for Torquay United and Bristol City. He was born in Wolverhampton.

== Career ==
Smith joined West Bromwich Albion as an amateur, but left to join Torquay United in 1953 without breaking into the Baggies' first team.

He made his Torquay debut in a 3–1 win away to Walsall on 5 December 1953, with the regular left-back Jimmy Drinkwater out of the side. He initially lost his place when Drinkwater returned, but after two games out of the side, regained his place, Drinkwater switching to right-back as the on-loan Harry Parfitt missed out. He began the following season as the regular left-back in the Torquay side, playing in the FA Cup 4th round tie at home to Huddersfield Town in front of a record crowd of 21,908, which Huddersfield won 1–0. He lost his place late in the season, with John Anderton taking his place and played just 14 times in the 1955–56 season.

He started the 1956–57 season out of the first team with Anderton and then regular centre-half John James playing at left-back. However, Smith soon regained his place and remained a regular for the remainder of the season as Torquay lost out on promotion to Division Two on goal average from Ipswich Town.

He played 188 league games for Torquay, scoring just once, before leaving in July 1961 to join Bristol City. He played just once for the Ashton Gate side before leaving league football to settle down in Torquay, where he became an avid pigeon racer. He died in 2016, with the club paying tribute to him on social media.
