= Jon Anderson (disambiguation) =

Jon Anderson (real name John Roy Anderson, born 1944) is a singer and musician with the rock band Yes.

Jon Anderson may also refer to:

- Jon Anderson (poet) (1940–2007), American poet and author
- Jon Anderson (athlete) (born 1949), American marathon runner
- Jon Lee Anderson (born 1957), biographer, author, reporter, and staff writer for The New Yorker
- Jon Anderson (journalist) (born 1958), Australian sports journalist
- Jon Anderson (publisher) (born 1963), American publisher and author who uses the pseudonym William Boniface
- Jon Anderson (wrestler) (born 1984), American sport wrestler
- Jon Anderson (American football), American football coach and former player
- Jon Anderson, long-time partner and model of Paul Cadmus

== See also ==
- Jonathan Anderson (disambiguation)
- Jon Andersen, American professional wrestler
- Jon Øyvind Andersen, Norwegian black metal guitarist
- John Anderson (disambiguation)
