= Jonathan Anderson =

Jonathan Anderson may refer to:

- Jonathan Anderson (American football) (born 1991), American football player
- Jonathan Anderson (fashion designer) (born 1984), Northern Irish fashion designer

== See also ==
- John Anderson (disambiguation)
- Jon Anderson (disambiguation)
