= Samuel Walker Williams =

American politician (1848–1920)

Samuel W. Williams

21st Attorney General of Virginia
- In office February 1910 – February 1914
- Preceded by: William A. Anderson
- Succeeded by: John Garland Pollard

Member of the Virginia Senate from the 5th district
- In office December 2, 1885 – December 3, 1889
- Preceded by: Samuel H. Newberry
- Succeeded by: G. W. Easley

Personal details
- Born: Samuel Walker Williams; January 24, 1848 Leatherwood, Virginia, U.S.
- Died: August 6, 1920 (aged 72) Roanoke, Virginia, U.S.
- Party: Democratic
- Spouses: Maggie Grayson; Lucy Henry Walker
- Relatives: Martin Williams (brother)
- Education: University of Virginia
- Occupation: Lawyer; judge; politician

Military service
- Allegiance: Confederate States
- Branch/service: Virginia Militia; Confederate States Army
- Rank: Private (CSA)
- Unit: 5th Virginia Cavalry
- Battles/wars: American Civil War

Samuel Walker Williams (January 24, 1848 – August 6, 1920) became a Virginia lawyer, Commonwealth attorney for Bland County and judge after serving as a Confederate soldier and before defeating fellow former Confederate but Readjuster Samuel H. Newberry to serve as a Democrat in the Virginia Senate and decades later as Attorney General of Virginia. Williams unsuccessfully ran for Congress in 1896. The library at Virginia Tech holds his papers.

Legal offices
Preceded by William A. Anderson	Attorney General of Virginia; 1910–1914	Succeeded by John Garland Pollard
