= Jack Anderson =

Jack Anderson may refer to one of the following people:

== Sports ==
- Jack Anderson (American football) (born 1998), American football player
- Jack Anderson (baseball, born 1994), American baseball player (Seattle Mariners organization)
- Jack Anderson (baseball, born 1999), American baseball player (Detroit Tigers and Boston Red Sox organizations)
- Jack Anderson (cyclist) (born 1987), Australian road racing cyclist
- Jack Anderson (footballer, born 1908) (1908–1960), Australian rules footballer for Richmond and North Melbourne
- Jack Anderson (footballer, born 1909) (1909–1982), Australian rules footballer for St Kilda
- Jack Anderson (racing driver), retired NASCAR Grand National Driver in 1964 Capital City 300

== Other ==
- Jack Anderson (columnist) (1922–2005), American newspaper columnist
- Jack Anderson (dance critic) (1935–2023), American poet, dance critic, and dance historian
- Jack E. Anderson (1929–1993), creator of oversized statues in the Midwestern United States
- Jack R. Anderson, director of bands at the University of Pittsburgh
- Jack Z. Anderson (1904–1981), United States Representative from California

== See also ==
- Black Jack Anderson (died 1837), African-American sealer and pirate active off Western Australia
- John Anderson (disambiguation)
