= Francis T. Anderson =

American judge

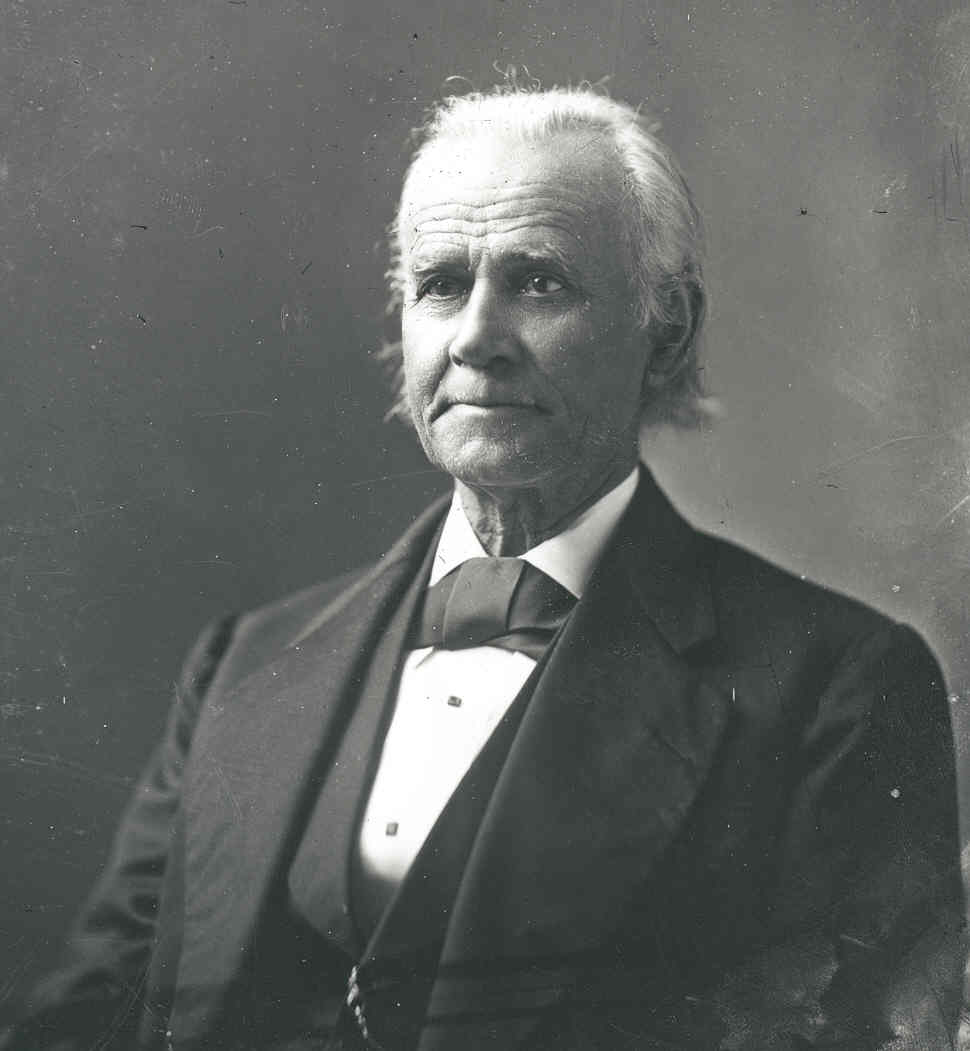

Justice of the Supreme Court of Virginia
- In office January 1, 1871 – January 1, 1883
- Preceded by: Westel Willoughby
- Succeeded by: Thomas T. Fauntleroy

Member of the Virginia House of Delegates from the Rockbrige County district
- In office December 2, 1861 – September 6, 1863 Serving with Samuel McD Reid
- Preceded by: W.H. Patterson
- Succeeded by: Robert J. White

Personal details
- Born: December 11, 1808 Botetourt County, Virginia, U.S.
- Died: November 30, 1887 (aged 78) Lexington, Virginia, U.S.
- Party: Democratic
- Education: Washington and Lee University

Military service
- Allegiance: Confederate States of America

Francis Thomas Anderson, Sr. (December 11, 1808 – November 30, 1887) was a 19th-century American lawyer, politician and slaveowner, who served in the Virginia House of Delegates during the American Civil War and later served on the Supreme Court of Appeals of Virginia.

== Early and family life ==
Born in Botetourt County, Virginia to farmer, soldier and one-term delegate William Anderson (1763-1834) and his wife, the former Anna Thomas (d. 1848), who had married in 1796. Taught first by his mother, Anderson later attended Curtis Alderson's school at Ben Salem in Rockbridge County, Virginia. Later Anderson attended the Fincastle Classical School in the Botetourt county seat for several years before enrolling in Washington College in Lexington, Rockbridge County, from which he graduated at the age of nineteen. He read law under Fleming B. Miller and lawyer, scholar and judge Chancellor Creed Taylor (1791-1873).

He married Mary Ann Alexander (1806-1881) on December 8, 1830 in Rockbridge County. Children included: Anna Aylett Anderson (1833-1911), Mary Evelyn Anderson (1835-1916), Frances "Margaret" Anderson (1836-1925), Josephine Reid Anderson (1838-1912), Katherine Anderson (1840-1840), William Alexander Anderson (1842-1931), Theodore Anderson (1844-1844), Belle Graham Anderson (1847-1927), Francis Thomas Anderson (1848-1911)

== Career ==
Admitted to the bar at the age of twenty-one, Anderson had a private legal practice, as well as taught a small class of law students, but stopped the latter because of the demands of his law practice. In the 1850 census, Anderson owned twelve enslaved individuals, ranging from a 50 year old Black man and 36 year old mulatto woman to 3, 4 and 6 year old boys. Nearby, John Anderson owned 31 enslaved individuals.

In 1855, Anderson moved to Rockbridge County where he lived until 1866. He continued to own slaves in Rockbridge County, their number increasing to 20 and age range from 58 and 52 year old Black men and 52 year old mulatto woman and a 46 year old Black woman to a one year old Black boy. although John T. Anderson continued to own 31.

According to a document in the archive of the Virginia Military Institute, "Judge F. T. Anderson was to give an oration and raise the US flag at the court house (April 1861), but when he learned that Virginia had seceded (17 April 1861) he announced that the flag now "was in the hands of the enemy and would not be raised in Lexington." His son William soon enlisted in the Liberty Hall volunteers and fought at the First Battle of Manassas, and in September was discharged because of his knee wound. By year's end Rockingham voters elected Francis Anderson to the Virginia House of Delegates, where he served part-time alongside veteran Samuel McD. Reid. He had succeeded Andrew Patterson, but owing to impaired health, declined re-election in 1863, so Robert J. White succeeded him. Anderson received a presidential pardon on July 21, 1865, agreeing to not again use enslaved labor, and by 1869, resumed his legal practice. In 1870, legislators elected him to a 12-year term on the Supreme Court of Appeals. Here, he remained until his term expired in 1883 when legislators refused to renew him nor the other justices, and completely changed that appellate court. After that forced retirement, Anderson returned to private practice. From 1879 until his death in 1888, he also served as rector of Washington and Lee University.

== Death and legacy ==
Anderson lived his final years with his wife and two unmarried daughters, who survived him. His son William continued his involvement in law and politics, serving in both houses of the Virginia General Assembly as well as the Virginia Constitutional Convention of 1901-1902, during which he won election as Virginia's attorney general. Like his father, William Anderson also became rector of Washington and Lee University.
