= John Anderson, My Jo =

Scottish folk song

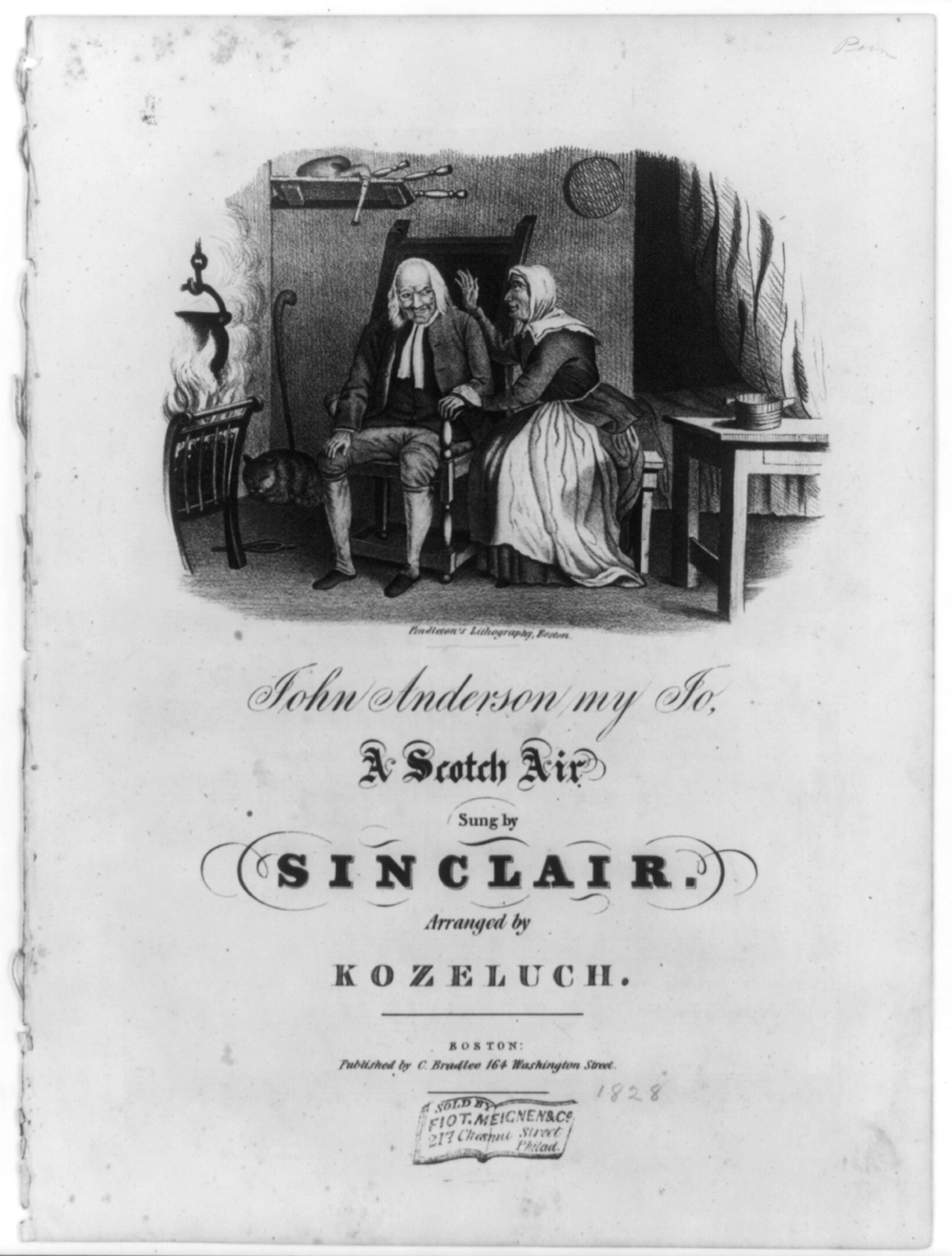
Cover of John Anderson my Jo printed as sheet music, Boston 1828

John Anderson, My Jo is a Scottish folk song best known in an adaptation by Robert Burns. Several sets of lyrics with the same opening line are known before Burns. The word "jo" in the title is often misconstrued as a pet-form of the name John, but in fact is a Scots word meaning a sweetheart or darling. So the title means "John Anderson, my love." It is not known whether a historical person is described in the poem, but Whitelaw records a tradition that the original John Anderson was a town piper in Kelso.

== Melody ==
The melody is of disputed origin, as there are several older Scots melodies that resemble it. It is recorded without a text but with the title "John Andersonne my Jo" in the Skene Manuscript (ca 1630) (Note: Edinburgh, National Library of Scotland, MS Adv.5.2.15), a collection of Scottish airs arranged for mandora. It is found in printed collections of fiddle music from the early 18th century onwards, and notation for a dance to the tune is found in the Agnes Hume Manuscript (Note: Edinburgh, National Library of Scotland, MS Adv.5.2.17) of 1704. This is believed to be the earliest description of any Scottish country dance. The Traditional Tune Archive notes that some forty variations of the tune are found throughout the British Isles. The London publisher William Napier commissioned an arrangement by Haydn for voice, violin and keyboard, (Note: Josef Haydn, Hob.XXXIa:2, part of the Schottische Volkslieder, Hob.XXXIa:1-150) first printed in 1792.

== Early Versions ==
The earliest known versions of the poem are bawdy rhymes, on the sexual prowess of John Anderson.

The 17th-century Percy Folio (Note: London, British Library, Add. MS. 27879) has a poem that begins: John Anderson, my jo, cum in as ye gae by, / And ye sall get a sheip's heid weel baken in a pye... The singer also offers John Anderson a haggis if he will enter the house, and reveals that she has five children, three of them conceived when her husband was away.

== Robert Burns ==
John Anderson my Jo in the Scots Musical Museum 1889, vol. 3 p.269

Burns' first version of the poem was made in 1789 for publication in the Scots Musical Museum. It changed the tone completely, making it a love song by an older woman who thinks of her husband as a young man and honours him now he has aged. The first strophe compares his earlier dark hair and smooth brow with the grey hair and receding hairline she sees now. The second remembers happy days on the mountain and ponders how they will soon be buried together in the valley.

John Anderson my jo, John,

When we were first acquent;

Your locks were like the raven,

Your bony brow was brent;

But now your brow is beld, John,

Your locks are like the snaw;

But blessings on your frosty pow,

John Anderson my jo.

John Anderson my jo, John,

We clamb the hill the gither;

And mony a canty day, John

We've had wi' ane anither:

Now we maun totter down, John,

And hand in hand we'll go;

And sleep the gither at the foot,

John Anderson my jo.

jo, "darling"; bony, "fair"; brent, "unwrinkled"; beld, "bald"; pow, "head"; clamb, "climbed"; the gither, "together"; canty, "pleasant".

Despite the acknowledgement of decline and death, this is not a lament, but rather, a celebration of a good life shared in its entirety.

== Later versions ==
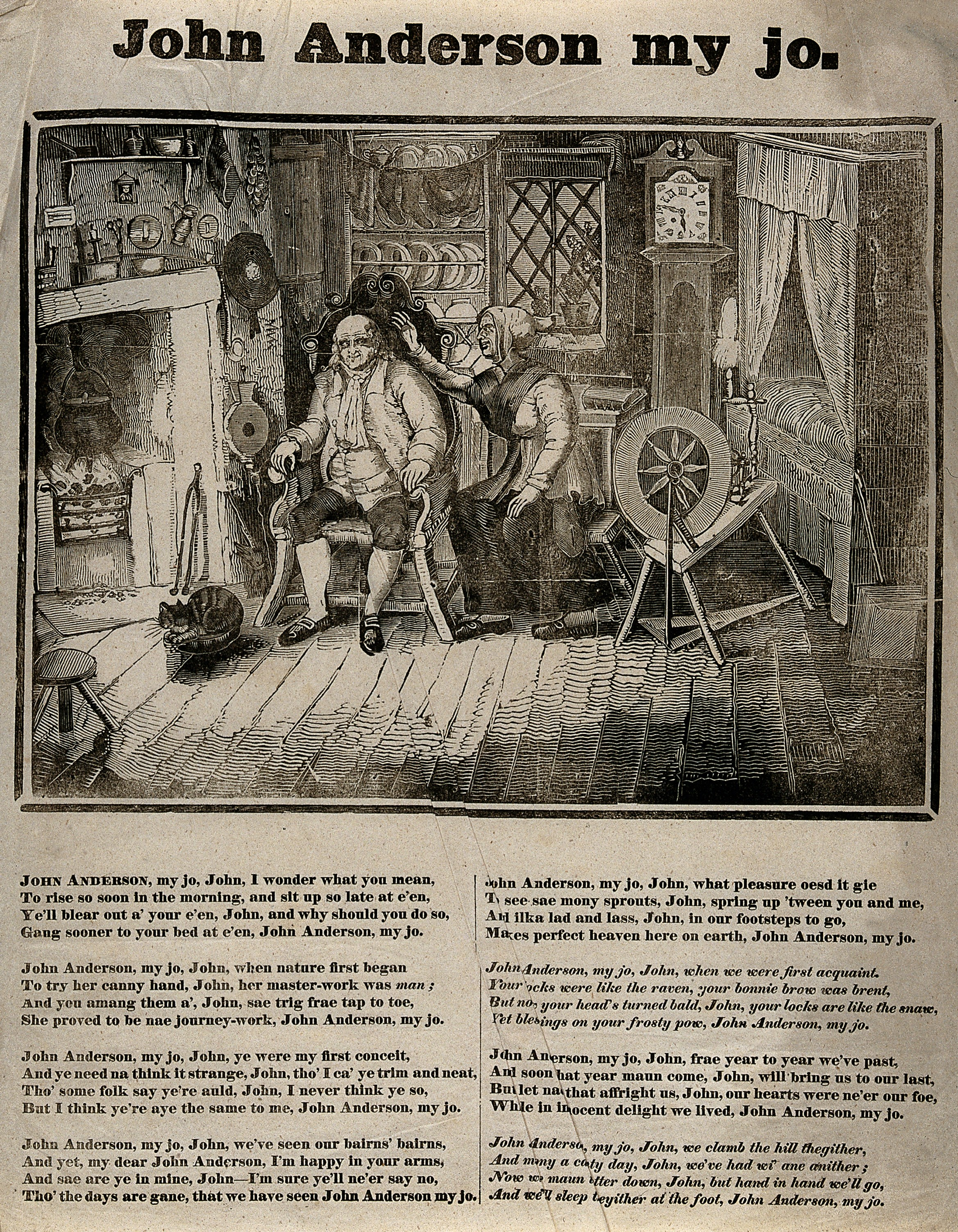
The Reid version in a woodcut dated 1820

Whitelaw prints a nine-stanza version attributed to the Glasgow publisher William Reid, which echoes Burns' style and sentiments.

== Reception ==
Political parodies of the song appeared in the 19th century. In 1849, a version mocking the Prime Minister, Lord John Russell, appeared in The People's Advocate, Sydney: John Minister, my jo, John, when we were first acquaint, / Ye were a bold Reformer, on liberal measures bent; / But now ye’re growing cold, John, ye’re getting slack and slow; / I wonder what has come to ye, John Minister, my jo. Similar political parodies are found in New Zealand and Canada.

During the American election of 1860, the Republican campaign used a version of the song that began: John Anderson, my Jo, John, / When we were first acquent, / The farms of Uncle Sam, John, / For Freedom's sons were meant. Here the youthful John represents the hopes of the young republic, and the decline of old age signifies the damage done by slavery; but the song names "Old Honest Abe" as the man who has the remedy.

== Translations ==
There are a number of celebrated translations of Burns' 1798 version. A German translation by Wilhelm Gerhard, John Anderson, mein Lieb, John! / Wir haben uns gesehn, was twice arranged for choir with entirely new melodies by Schumann. (Note: Robert Schuman, Romanzen und Balladen für Chor, op. 67 no.5 & op. 145 no. 14) Of the several known Gaelic translations, the most interesting is an anonymous one from 1894, which changes Anderson's name to Campbell and integrates the setting into highland culture: Iain Chaimbeul, tùs ar n-eòlais, / Bu bhòidheach, deas, do chruth. The song has been translated into Russian at least twelve times, the first by Mikhail Mikhailov in 1856. There is a Hungarian translation by Lőrinc Szabó entitled "John Anderson, szivem, John".

== Bibliography ==
- Bowan, Kate (2013). "The travels of 'John Anderson, my jo'". Humanities Research. 19 (3): 57–70.
- Drew, Thomas (1860). Republican Songs for the People (PDF). Boston: Thayer & Eldredge.
- Fleet, J.F.; Fleet, T.M. (1967). "The Scottish Country Dance: It's Origins and Development I". Scottish Studies. 11 (1): 1–11.
- Gerhard, Wilhelm (1840). Robert Burns’ Gedichte. Leipzig: Verlag Johann Ambrosius Barth.
- McGregor, Angus (2020). "Agnes Hume Manuscript". Historical Music of Scotland.
- McLure, J. Derrick (2004). "Gaelic Translations of Burns". Studies in Scottish Literature. 33 (1): 253–280.
- Robinson, Mairi (1985). The Concise Scots Dictionary. Aberdeen University Press.
- Scholes, Percy A. (1970). The Oxford Companion to Music (10th ed.). OUP.
- Szerb, Antal (1944). Száz vers [A hundred poems] (in Hungarian). Magvető Kiadó.
- Whitelaw, Alexander (1844). The Book of Scottish Song, Collected and Illustrated with Historical and Critical Notices.
- Wood, John Muir (1900). "Skene Manuscript". In Grove, George (ed.). A Dictionary of Music and Musicians.
- Zhatkin, Dmitry N.; Ryabova, Anna A. (2019). "Russian translation reception of Robert Burns's poem 'John Anderson my Jo'". Religación: Revista de Ciencias Sociales y Humanidades. 419: 137–144. ISSN 2477-9083.
