= John Anderson (carpenter) =

Scottish carpenter (1748–1832)

John Anderson (1748 in Ayrshire – May 4, 1832 in Invergarry) was a Scottish carpenter by trade. He was a close friend of Robert Burns and is reputed to have built his coffin in 1796. There appears to be a tradition that he was the subject of a famous poem by Burns called "John Anderson, My Jo, John." However, Burns's poem is in fact a reworking of a folk song.

John Anderson was buried in Kilchuimen Burial Ground, Fort Augustus with a Scottish Heritage plaque. It mentions that his son in law was killed in the wreck of an early British passenger steamship, PS Comet II, near Gourock in 1825.

The heritage plaque reads:

"John Anderson. My Jo.
Friend of Robert Burns
Character of one of the most touching of Burns Songs. Gifted by the family of the late Norman Watters
Past President of Bowhill People's Burns Club"

The stone reads:

"Sacred to the memory of
John Anderson who died at Invergarry
the 4 May 1832 Aged 84 years
also his daughter Catherine who died at Invergarry the 20 December 1832 aged 52 years
Relict of the late
James Grierson who was lost in the "Comet" off Gourack Point the 20 Oct 1825
This stone is erected by their affectionate children."
