= Fool Bull =

Brulé Sioux medicine man

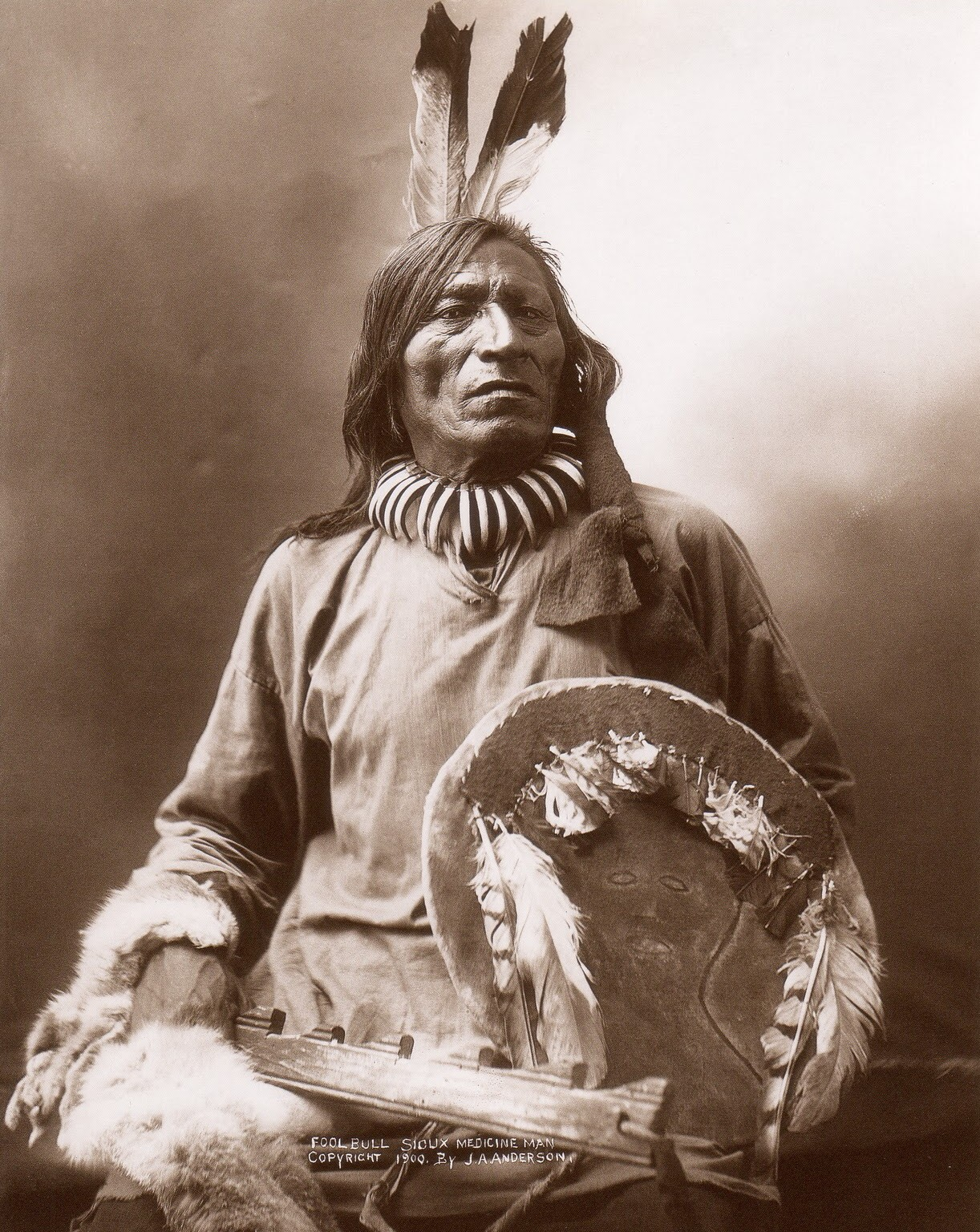
Fool Bull in a photo from 1900

Fool Bull (c. 1849 – 1909), also known as Tatanka Witko, was a Brulé Sioux medicine man.

Photographer John Alvin Anderson's famous photo of Fool Bull taken in 1900 at the Rosebud Indian Reservation is at display in the Nebraska State Historical Society.
