= John Anderson (Australian footballer) =

Australian rules footballer

Personal information
- Full name: John Anderson
- Born: 31 May 1888; Essendon, Victoria
- Died: 3 August 1957 (aged 69)
- Original team: Essendon District

Playing career^{1}
Years	Club	Games (Goals)
1907	Essendon	3 (0)
- ^{1} Playing statistics correct to the end of 1907.

John Anderson (31 May 1888 – 3 August 1957) was an Australian rules footballer who played with Essendon in the Victorian Football League (VFL).

== Family ==
The son of John Anderson, and Jane Anderson, née Taylor, John Anderson was born at Essendon, Victoria on 31 May 1888.

== Football ==
Recruited from Essendon Juniors, he played his first match for Essendon, against Geelong, on 27 April 1907.
