= John Anderton (footballer) =

English footballer (1933–2019)

Personal information
- Date of birth: 7 February 1933
- Place of birth: Skelmersdale, England
- Date of death: February 2019 (aged 85–86)
- Place of death: Lancashire, England
- Position: Defender

Youth career
- Everton

Senior career*
| Years | Team | Apps | (Gls) |
| 1951–1954 | Everton | 0 | (0) |
| 1954–1958 | Torquay United | 40 | (2) |
| 1958–1960 | Dover F.C. | ? | (?) |
| ?-? | Hastings United | ? | (?) |
- * Club domestic league appearances and goals

John Anderton (7 February 1933 – February 2019) was an English professional footballer who played in the Football League for Torquay United in the 1950s.

Anderton was born in Skelmersdale. He began his career as a junior with Everton, turning professional in March 1951. Over the next three seasons, after suffering several injuries, he failed to make the first team at Goodison Park, and in July 1954 moved to Torquay United. His league debut came at right back on 22 September 1954 against Shrewsbury Town at Plainmoor, but he finally got his break towards the end of the season when he replaced Harry Smith at left back, playing the final 11 games of the season.

Anderton began the following season as first choice, but had to share the spot with Bill Towers and Smith, making 24 appearances as the Gulls finished in fifth place. He scored on the opening day of the following season, netting the first in a 4–1 home win against Ipswich Town on 18 August 1956, but suffered a serious injury in the same game, and this proved to be his only appearance of the season as Torquay went on to lose out in the final table to Ipswich on goal average, Smith regaining his place in the side as regular left-back. Returning the following season from injury he made just three more appearances for Torquay before leaving league football in 1959 to join Dover FC helping them to victory in the Kent Senior Cup that season. He subsequently played for Hastings United.

Anderton died in Lancashire in February 2019.
