= John Anderson (genealogist, 1789–1832) =

Scottish surgeon and genealogist (1789–1832)

John Anderson (6 June 1789 – 24 December 1832) was a Scottish surgeon and genealogist, of Hamilton, Lanarkshire.

He was born on 6 June 1789, at Gilmerton House, Midlothian, and became a licentiate of the Royal College of Surgeons of Edinburgh, and while passing the college examinations was appointed by the Duke of Hamilton (then Marquis of Douglas) first surgeon to the Lanarkshire Militia, and afterwards his own medical adviser, positions which he held to the time of his death. He was very unassuming, of social disposition, and noted for his benevolence. He died 24 December 1832 of inflammation of the brain. His large work, 'Historical and Genealogical Memoirs of the House of Hamilton,’ in quarto, was published at Edinburgh in 1825; a supplement was issued in 1827. For twenty-nine years before his death Anderson was engaged upon a 'Statistical History of Lanarkshire,’ and also upon a 'Genealogical History of the Robertsons of Struan,’ but neither of these works appears to have been printed.

== See also ==
- John Anderson (genealogist, fl. 1825)
