= John Wesley Anderson =

American author, public speaker, and retired law enforcement officer

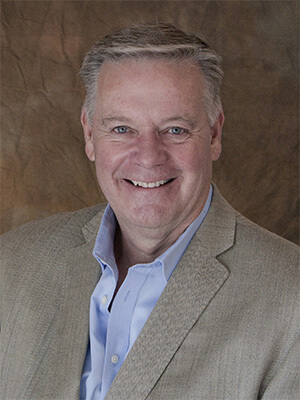
- Citizenship: American
- Occupations: Author, Public speaker, Retired sheriff
- Years active: 1972–present
- Known for: Retired Sheriff of El Paso County, Colorado
- Notable work: LOU AND JONBENÉT: A Legendary Lawman's Quest To Solve A Child Beauty Queen's Murder
- Website: www.jwander.com

John Wesley Anderson (born January 20, 1954) is an American author, public speaker, and retired law enforcement officer. He served as the elected sheriff of El Paso County, Colorado. Anderson is also known as a TEDx speaker and published author focusing on Colorado history and law enforcement.

== Career ==
In 1972, Anderson began his law enforcement career with the Colorado Springs Police Department where he served for 22 years, retiring at the rank of sergeant. In 1995, he was elected sheriff of El Paso County and in 2003, he was term-limited.

Anderson's work has been published in the Canadian Society of Forensic Science Journal (Volume 25, Number 2, June 1992).

Anderson served as an advisor for the 2024 Netflix documentary Cold Case: Who Killed JonBenét Ramsey.

== Bibliography ==
=== Historical Non-fiction ===
#	Title	Publication Date
1	Ute Indian Prayer Trees of the Pikes Peak Region	2015
2	Rankin Scott Kelly, First Sheriff El Paso County, Colorado Territory	2017
3	Native American Prayer Trees of Colorado	2018
4	A to Z Colorado's Nearly Forgotten History 1776–1876	2021

=== Fiction and Narrative ===
#	Title	Publication Date
1	R.S. Kelly: A Man of the Territory	2019
2	Sherlock Holmes in Little London, 1896: The Missing Year	2020
3	ZacBox and the Pearls of Pleiades	2020

=== True Crime ===
#	Title	Publication Date
1	Lou and JonBenét: A Legendary Lawman's Quest	2023
