= William Alexander Anderson =

American politician (1842–1930)

William A. Anderson

20th Attorney General of Virginia
- In office January 1, 1901 – February 1910
- Governor: Andrew Jackson Montague; Claude A. Swanson
- Preceded by: Andrew Jackson Montague
- Succeeded by: Samuel Walker Williams

Member of the Virginia House of Delegates from Rockbridge County
- In office January 9, 1918 – January 13, 1920
- Preceded by: Hugh A. White
- Succeeded by: William M. McNutt
- In office December 8, 1887 – December 4, 1889 Serving with John T. McKee
- Preceded by: Charles F. Jordan
- Succeeded by: Greenlee D. Letcher
- In office December 5, 1883 – December 1, 1885 Serving with Matthew W. Paxton
- Preceded by: Robert K. Dunlap or James A Frazier
- Succeeded by: Charles F. Jordan

Member of the Virginia Senate from the Rockbridge, Alleghany and Botetourt Counties, Virginia district
- In office October 5, 1869 – December 31, 1873
- Preceded by: David S.G. Cabell
- Succeeded by: John L. Eubank

Personal details
- Born: May 11, 1842 Fincastle, Botetourt County, Virginia
- Died: June 21, 1930 (aged 88) Lexington, Rockbridge County, Virginia
- Party: Democratic
- Spouse: Mary Louisa "Maza" Blair
- Children: 4
- Education: Washington & Lee University
- Profession: Lawyer, politician

Military service
- Allegiance: Confederate States
- Branch/service: Virginia Militia; Confederate States Army
- Rank: First Sergeant (CSA)
- Unit: 4th Virginia Infantry
- Battles/wars: First Battle of Bull Run

William Alexander Anderson (May 11, 1842 – June 21, 1930) was a Virginia lawyer, Confederate soldier and Democratic politician, who served in both houses of the Virginia General Assembly, twice won election as Attorney General of Virginia, and also served as rector of his alma mater, Washington & Lee University.

== Early and family life ==
Born in Botetourt County, Virginia, in 1842, Anderson was the son of lawyer Francis T. Anderson, who by 1855 had moved his family to Lexington in Rockbridge County, Virginia, to become rector of his alma mater, Washington College (that became Washington & Lee University in his lifetime). He was named for his paternal grandfather, who had represented Botetourt County in the 1831-1832 legislative session. His maternal grandfather was Andrew Alexander, whose ancestor Archibald Alexander emigrated from County Antrim, Ireland, and settled near Augusta in Rockbridge County in 1747. Young William Anderson received a private education suitable to his class. He was enrolled at Washington College in Lexington when Virginia seceded in May 1861.

He married twice and had five children. His first wife, Ellen. G. Anderson of Richmond, died in 1872. His second wife was Mary Louisa Blair of Lexington.

== Confederate soldier and aftermath ==
By the following month, Anderson had enlisted in the Confederate Army, having joined the "Liberty Hall Volunteers," a group of Washington College students and alumni, who became part of the Fourth Virginia Infantry Regiment under the command of former Virginia Military Institute professor Stonewall Jackson. A bullet shattered Anderson's kneecap at the Battle of First Manassas on July 21, and he was mustered out for disability by September 13, 1861. However, he joined a temporary artillery company in Albemarle County, composed of other disabled veterans, and briefly returned to fight against Union General David Hunter.

Meanwhile, his father had been elected to the Virginia House of Delegates in 1861, but ill-health caused F.T. Anderson to decline a re-election campaign, though a decade later he had recovered enough to accept a position on the Virginia Supreme Court. During the war, the disabled younger Anderson completed his education, and continued in his father's career path following the conflict, by attending the University of Virginia Law School and graduating in 1866.

== Lawyer and politician ==
A member of the state executive committee of the Democratic Party for many years, Anderson first won election to the Senate of Virginia, representing Rockbridge, Bath and Alleghany counties (part-time) for single term, from 1869 to 1873. "In 1870, Anderson was credited with introducing the bill establishing the public school system of Virginia as put forth by Dr. William Henry Ruffner."

Nearly a decade later, Rockbridge County voters elected Anderson one of their representatives (also part-time), in the Virginia House of Delegates, so from 1883 to 1885 he served alongside Matthew W. Paxton (of a family which had previously sent other members to the House of Delegates), but voters refused to re-elect either man, replacing them with Charles F. Jordan and Jacob W. Arnold in 1885, whose terms also proved solitary. Rockbridge voters again elected Anderson (this time alongside John T. McKee) to serve in the 1887 assembly, before again refusing to re-elect either man, but instead replacing them with Greenlee D. Letcher and James M. Johnston (only the former winning re-election). Anderson became one of the principal authors of the Anderson-McCormick Election Act (allowing the General Assembly to elect 3-member boards of election in each county) that in combination with the Walton Act (which required use of the secret ballot as well as that voters cross out three fourths of the name of every candidate the voter voted against), reduced the number of Black Virginians eligible to vote, as well as the number of Black officeholders.

In 1899, Anderson became president of the Virginia Bar Association, and made disenfranchisement of African Americans the subject of his presidential address. He soon had an opportunity to place his ideas into practice, as Rockbridge and Buena Vista County voters elected Anderson and J.W. Gilmore to represent them in the Virginia Constitutional Convention of 1901-1902. Anderson became one of the convention's key members, in part because he came prepared with methods used by other Southern states to circumvent the Fifteenth Amendment's prohibition against denying men the right to vote based on their race or previous condition of servitude. Anderson served as chairman of the convention's revision committee, as well as president pro tempore of the convention as a whole (in the absence of its President, fellow lawyer, former Confederate and Congressman John Goode Jr.)], and also won election as the Commonwealth's Attorney General during the convention.

Despite pre-convention promises that voters would have a choice of ratifying the final document, a 47 to 38 majority of the convention's delegates voted to proclaim it as in effect as of July 10, 1902, and never submitted it to voters. When a man convicted of housebreaking in Augusta County complained that his trial for a felony without a jury was defective, Attorney General Anderson defended the conviction before the Virginia Supreme Court, and Justice George Moffett Harrison pronounced the new constitution valid, since it was accepted by the governor and legislature and all judges took oaths to support it. Federal appellate judges also refused to invalidate that new constitution. They relied upon a South Carolina constitutional convention case, Mills v. Green, 159 U.S. 651 (1895) and U.S. Supreme Court justice David Josiah Brewer took judicial notice that the U.S. House of Representatives had seated the congressmen elected by Virginia voters that year and "the thing sought to be prohibited has been done and cannot be undone by order of court". The underlying federal case in the U.S. District Court for the Eastern District of Virginia had been brought on behalf of voters in Virginia's 3rd congressional district by lawyer John S. Wise, likewise a former Confederate as well as former U.S. Congressman (but aligned with the Readjuster Party rather than the Democrats), against Virginia's Governor Andrew Jackson Montague as well as the Secretary of the Commonwealth and the Auditor of Public Accounts, and had sought a writ of prohibition against counting the November 1902 election returns and also complained that the party in power sought to disenfranchise colored voters. By the 1904 election, fifty percent fewer white, and ninety percent fewer black men voted.

Virginia voters re-elected Anderson Attorney General of Virginia in 1905. He and other lawyers also represented Virginia in its suit against West Virginia in the United States Supreme Court, to recover a share of Virginia's public debt as of 1861. When the case ended in 1920, the special commissioner recommended awarding attorneys fees to Anderson of $75,000.

Anderson also served on the state board of education after finishing his term as attorney general. He would win his final election to the House of Delegates in 1917, and represented part of Rockbridge county as well and neighboring Buena Vista county in the 1918 and 1919 sessions (John W. Stephenson representing the rest of Rockbridge and Buena Vista counties, together with Bath and Highland counties).

Anderson served on the Board of Trustees of his alma mater, Washington & Lee from 1885 to 1930, and also followed his father's path by serving as its rector from 1913 to 1924.

== Death and legacy ==
Anderson was buried in the Stonewall Jackson Cemetery in Lexington, Virginia. The trousers he was wearing at the First Battle of Manassas, with the hole in the knee, are on display in the museum at Washington & Lee University. His family's papers are held at the University of Virginia Library.

Legal offices
Preceded by Andrew J. Montague	Attorney General of Virginia; 1902–1910	Succeeded by Samuel Walker Williams
