= John Anderson (cricketer, born 1955) =

Australian cricketer (born 1955)

Personal information
- Born: 15 February 1955 (age 71); Melbourne, Australia

Domestic team information
- Years: Team
- 1976-1977: Victoria
- Source: Cricinfo, 5 December 2015

John Anderson (born 15 February 1955) is an Australian former cricketer. He played four first-class cricket matches for Victoria between 1976 and 1977.

== See also ==
- List of Victoria first-class cricketers
