= John Anderson (physician) =

English physician

John Anderson (died June 1804) was an English physician.

He practised as a physician at Kingston, Surrey, and subsequently, for several years before his death, was physician to, and a director of, the General Sea-bathing Infirmary at Margate, where he died in June 1804 at an advanced age. He wrote for his doctor's degree, which he took at the University of Edinburgh, a dissertation 'De Scorbuto,’ published in 1772. He was also author of 'Medical Remarks on Natural Spontaneous and Artificial Evacuations,’ London, 1788; and of 'A Practical Essay on the good and bad Effects of Sea-water and Sea-bathing.' He was a fellow of the Society of Antiquaries.

== See also ==
- English Medical Doctors
