= John C. Anderson (Pennsylvania politician) =

American politician

Member of the Philadelphia City Council
- In office 1979–1983

Personal details
- Born: c. 1942 Grand Rapids, Michigan, U.S.
- Died: October 3, 1983 (aged 41) Wynnefield, Philadelphia, U.S.

John C. Anderson (c. 1942 – October 3, 1983) was a member of the Philadelphia City Council from 1979 to 1983. Although it was not widely known at the time, Anderson, a Black gay man, was the first person from the LGBTQ community to serve on the council. In 2023, Rue Landau became the first openly LGBT person elected to the Philadelphia City Council.

== Early life and education ==
Anderson was born in Grand Rapids, Michigan to Elizabeth Anderson Monteiro, a teacher, and the Rev. Jesse Anderson, Sr (d. 1975), a civil rights activist. His brother was Rev. Jesse Anderson, Jr, one of the founders of Washington DC's Statehood Party. They grew up in Philadelphia where their father was pastor at St. Thomas Episcopal Church.

Anderson graduated from Overbrook High School in 1959. He received his BA from Lincoln University in 1963 and his law degree from Howard University School of Law in 1969.

== Career ==
He worked as an assistant district attorney and then as a partner at Bloom, Ocks, Fisher, and Anderson. Before being elected to city council, Anderson served as counsel to the City Council president.

== City Council ==
In 1979, Anderson was elected as an at-large member to the Philadelphia City Council. Anderson lived in Wynnefield. He was known as “a liberal lion of the time." He helped pass the Housing Opportunities Bill, a move against housing discrimination. In 1981, Anderson and John White Jr., also a council member, visited Israel.

In May 1983, Anderson was the top vote-getter in the primary for at-large city council seats.

== Death ==
On October 3, 1983, he died of AIDS at the age of 41, though it was reported as he died from sarcoidosis. At the time, he was running for re-election to the council. Michael Nutter, who later served as mayor of Philadelphia, was Anderson's campaign manager in 1983. The funeral was held at St. Thomas Episcopal Church in West Philadelphia. Then Mayor William J. Green III called Anderson "a vital force in City Council." The Philadelphia Daily News editorialized that he had been "remarkably talented" as a legislator and added "his loss is a loss for the entire city."

== Legacy ==
In 2014, the John C. Anderson Apartments opened on Spruce Street in Philadelphia as a place for LGBTQ seniors. A portrait of Anderson, painted by William Thomas Whiting, is in the lobby. The John C. Anderson Cultural Center is located at 5301 Overbrook Avenue in Philadelphia. Anderson's papers are held at Temple University.
