= John Anderson (footballer, born 1879) =

Scottish footballer

Personal information
- Full name: John Anderson
- Date of birth: 19 September 1879
- Place of birth: Rothesay, Scotland
- Position: Centre half

Senior career*
Years	Team	Apps	(Gls)
- Morton
- Rothesay Royal Victoria
1901	Chesterfield Town	2	(0)
- * Club domestic league appearances and goals

John Anderson (19 September 1879 in Rothesay, Argyll and Bute, Scotland – after 1900) was a Scottish professional football centre half who played in the English Football League for Chesterfield Town.
