= The Traditional Tune Archive =

Searchable digital library of traditional music

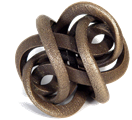
- Predecessor: The Fiddler's Companion
- Founded: 2010
- Founder: A. Kuntz & V. Pelliccioni
- Country of origin: United States
- Headquarters location: Wappingers Falls
- Distribution: Worldwide
- Key people: A. Kuntz, V. Pelliccioni
- Publication types: Annotated tunes database
- Official website: tunearch.org

The Traditional Tune Archive (TTA) is a searchable digital library dedicated to traditional music from Ireland, Great Britain, and North America. It provides music in standard notation and ABC notation, annotations on historical and cultural context, and extensive bibliographic and discographic references.

The archive is structured as a Semantic Web Index, which organizes information to facilitate semantic queries and complex musicological research. The TTA contains over 50,000 annotated tunes and is licensed under a Creative Commons Attribution-NonCommercial-ShareAlike 3.0 Unported License.

== History ==
The Traditional Tune Archive originated from The Fiddler's Companion, an extensive project created by Andrew Kuntz between 1996 and 2010. This earlier project cataloged traditional melodies alphabetically and included descriptive and anecdotal information without discriminating rigorously between fact and speculation.

As the project evolved, Kuntz, in collaboration with Valerio Pelliccioni, transitioned it into the more structured and analytical TTA, emphasizing accuracy, reliable sourcing, and clear distinction between factual information and cultural anecdotes.

== Recognition and Usage ==
The Traditional Tune Archive is a resource for musicological research and by communities dedicated to traditional music.

- The Irish Music research guide at Boston College Libraries includes the Traditional Tune Archive among the freely available sites for finding notated versions of tunes.
- An article in the Nineteenth‑Century Music Review published by Cambridge University Press on the value of digital collections of vernacular music manuscripts highlights the importance of digital archives such as the Traditional Tune Archive for contemporary musicological research.
- TTA's integration with Semantic MediaWiki has been noted for effectively structuring historical information, ABC notation, and cultural annotations, facilitating research and exploration of traditional tunes.

=== Organization and content ===
The archive contains over 80,000 tunes. Each entry has:

- Music: meter, rhythm, time signature, key, and tune structure.
- Description: region, genre/style.
- Context: composer/source, historical and geographical information, alternate titles.
- Bibliography and Discography: earliest known print or manuscript sources and recordings.
- Theme Code Index: a system derived from Charles Gore's The Scottish Fiddle Music Index, based on Breandán Breathnach’s methodology, facilitating tune identification and comparative research.

=== Search ===
The TTA database allows searches through keywords, alphabetical listings, and semantic queries via its "Query the Archive" function.

=== Featured tunes ===
Selected tunes highlighted by editors exemplify quality annotations and serve as models for contributors.

=== Mobile access ===
The archive provides a simplified mobile interface optimized for smartphones and tablets.

=== Licensing ===
The Traditional Tune Archive is licensed under a Creative Commons Attribution-NonCommercial-ShareAlike 3.0 License.
