= John Anderson (footballer, born 1931) =

English footballer

Personal information
- Full name: John Ephraim Anderson
- Date of birth: 7 June 1931
- Place of birth: Ridsdale, Northumberland, England
- Date of death: 2003 (aged 71–72)
- Position: Full-back

Senior career*
Years	Team	Apps	(Gls)
1953–1954	Langold Colliery Welfare		
1954–1958	Grimsby Town	3	(0)
1958–1959	Crystal Palace	0	(0)
- * Club domestic league appearances and goals

John Ephraim Anderson (7 June 1931 – 2003) was an English professional footballer who played as a full-back for Grimsby Town.
