= John Anderson (genealogist, 1798–1839) =

Scottish genealogist and antiquarian; Writer to the Signet (1798–1839)

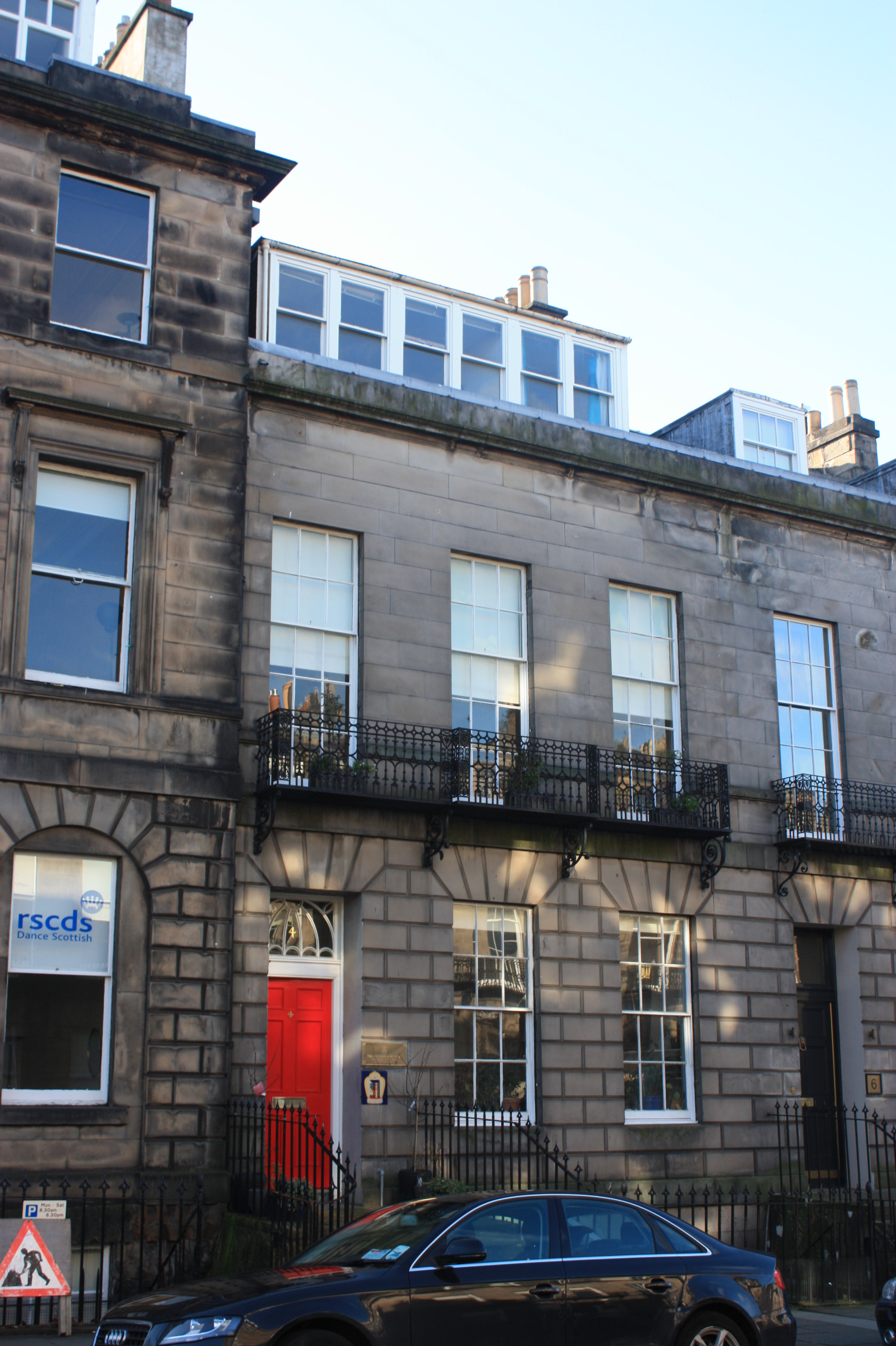
Anderson's house at 4 Walker Street, Edinburgh

John Anderson WS (16 August 1798 – 21 September 1839) was a Scottish genealogist, Writer to the Signet, and secretary to the Scottish Society of Antiquaries, an institute founded at Inverness in March 1825. He wrote a History of the Family of Frisel or Fraser, particularly Fraser of Lovat, embracing various notices illustrative of National Customs and Manners, with original correspondence of Simon Lord Lovat (1825, 4to, pp. 208). He also wrote the prize essay on the "State of Science and Knowledge in the Highlands of Scotland … at the period of the Rebellion in 1745, and of their progress up to the establishment of the Northern Institute for the Promotion of Science and Literature in 1825" which was published in 1827, and obtained the gold medal offered to competitors by Sir George Stewart Mackenzie.

He resided at 4 Walker Street, near the east end of Coates Crescent, Edinburgh, in 1825, but the dates of his birth and death are not on record. He is presumably the same "John Anderson WS" who is listed as living at 18 Moray Place in 1835.

== See also ==
- John Anderson (genealogist, 1789–1832)
