= John W. Anderson (politician) =

American politician

John Wright Anderson

Member of the Tennessee House of Representatives from the Humphreys County and Perry County floterial district
- In office 1936–1937
- Preceded by: J. T. DePriest
- Succeeded by: Pleas Doyle
- In office 1945–1946
- Preceded by: Hamilton H. Parks
- Succeeded by: William Morgan Conder

Personal details
- Born: February 1, 1897 Humphreys County, Tennessee, U.S.
- Party: Democratic Party (United States)
- Profession: Politician

John Wright Anderson (April 18, 1878 – October 21, 1972) was an American politician and member of the Tennessee House of Representatives and Tennessee State Senate. Anderson represented a floterial district comprising Perry County and Humphreys County
