= John Anderson (merchant) =

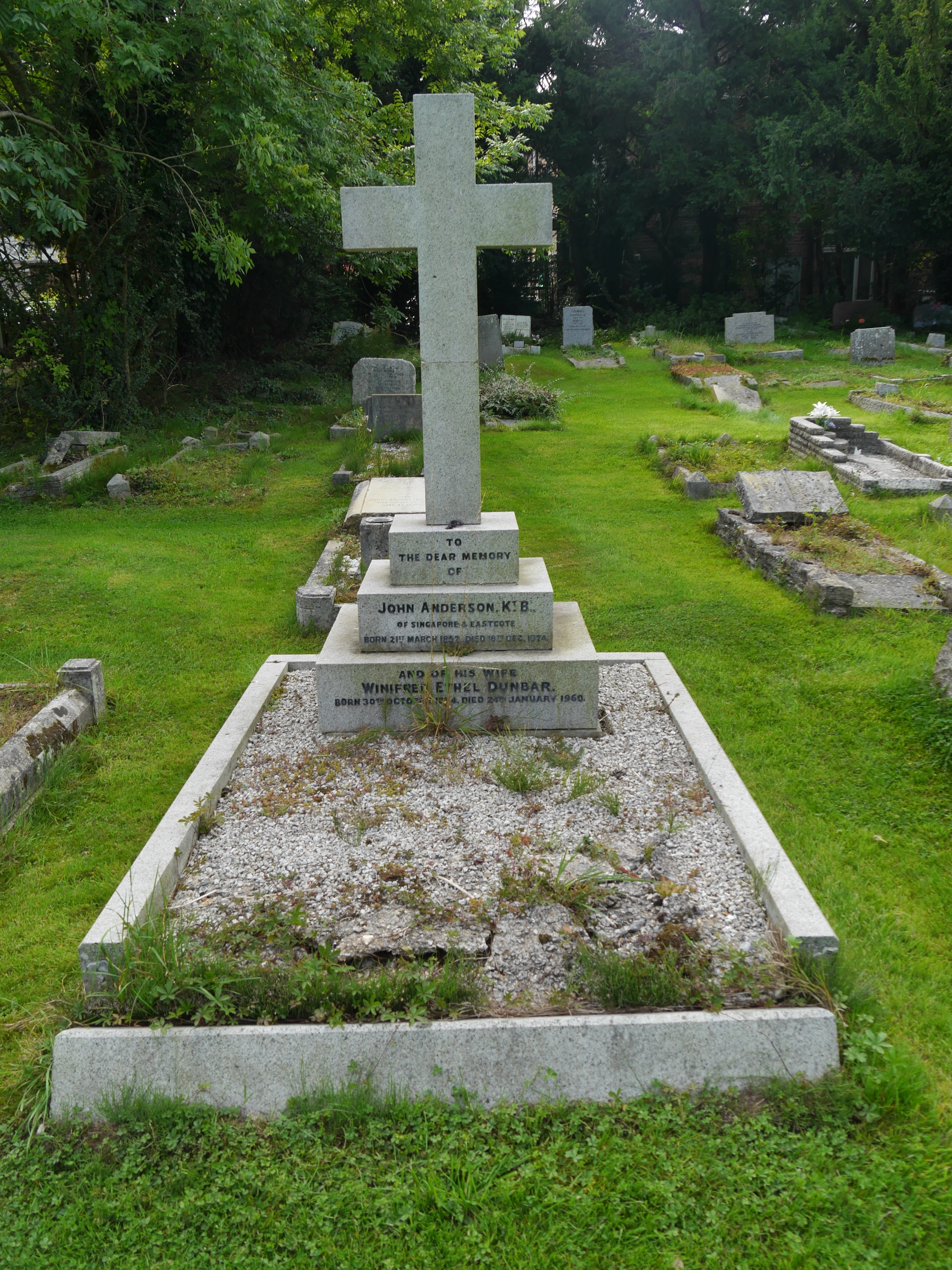
Anderson's grave, St Martin's Church, Ruislip

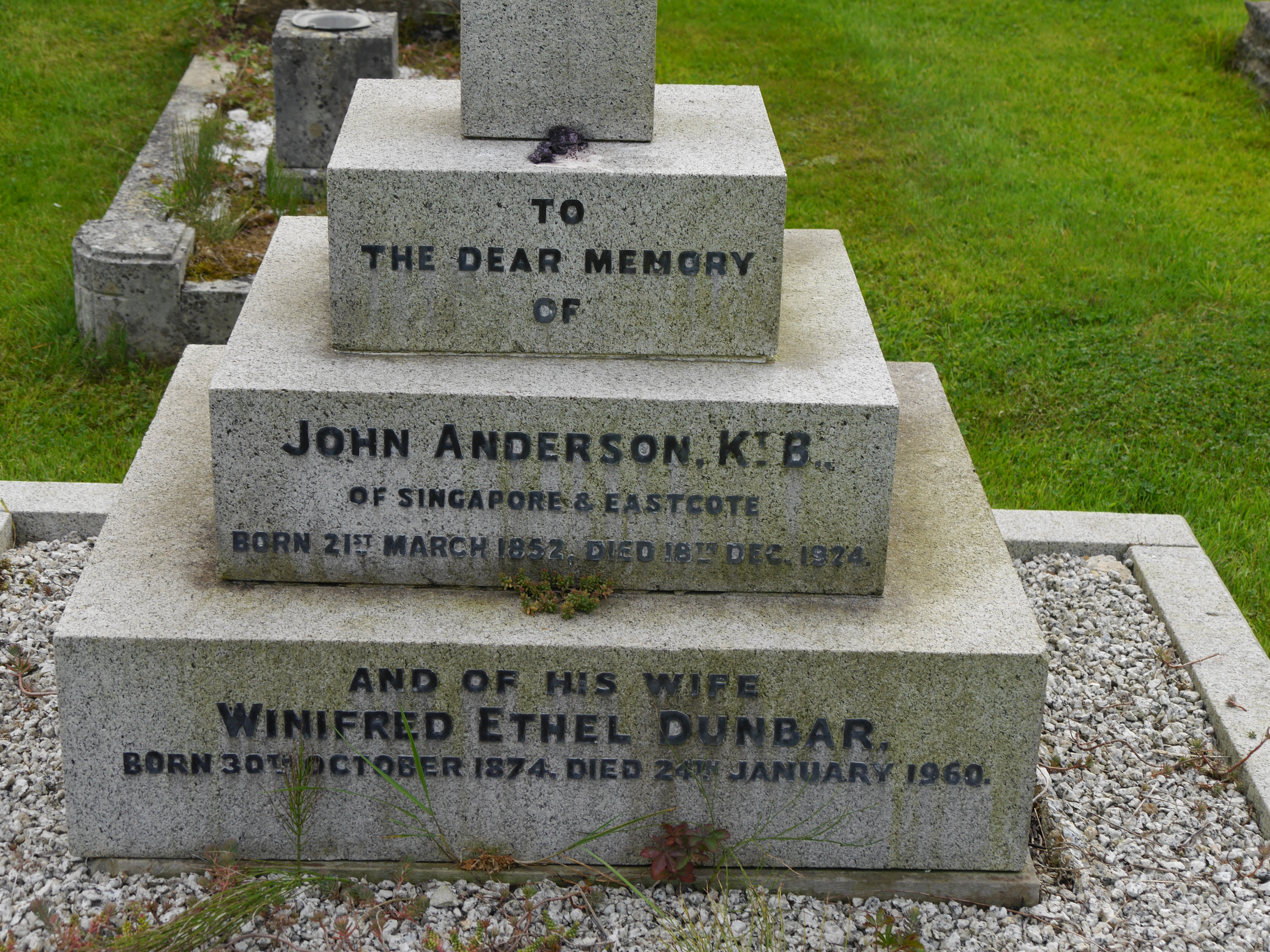
Grave detail

Sir John Anderson (1852–1924), was Scottish merchant, of Singapore and Eastcote.

He became sole owner of the trading firm of Guthrie & Co, and his "dominating role in rubber production made Anderson the most influential businessman of his generation in Malaya and especially in Singapore."

Anderson died at his house, Eastcote Place, near Pinner, Middlesex, on 18 December 1924. His second wife became sole owner of Guthries and its chairman. His third son, Keith became an important figure in the management of Guthries.

He is buried at St Martin's Church, Ruislip.
