= John Robert Anderson (chemist) =

Australian chemist

John Robert Anderson (5 March 1928 – 26 February 2007) was an Australian chemist whose research specialised on materials science. Anderson served as Chief of the Division of Material Sciences at the Commonwealth Scientific and Industrial Research Organisation from 1970 to 1978. He attended Sydney Boys High School from 1940 to 1944.
