= John Alvin Anderson =

Swedish-American photographer

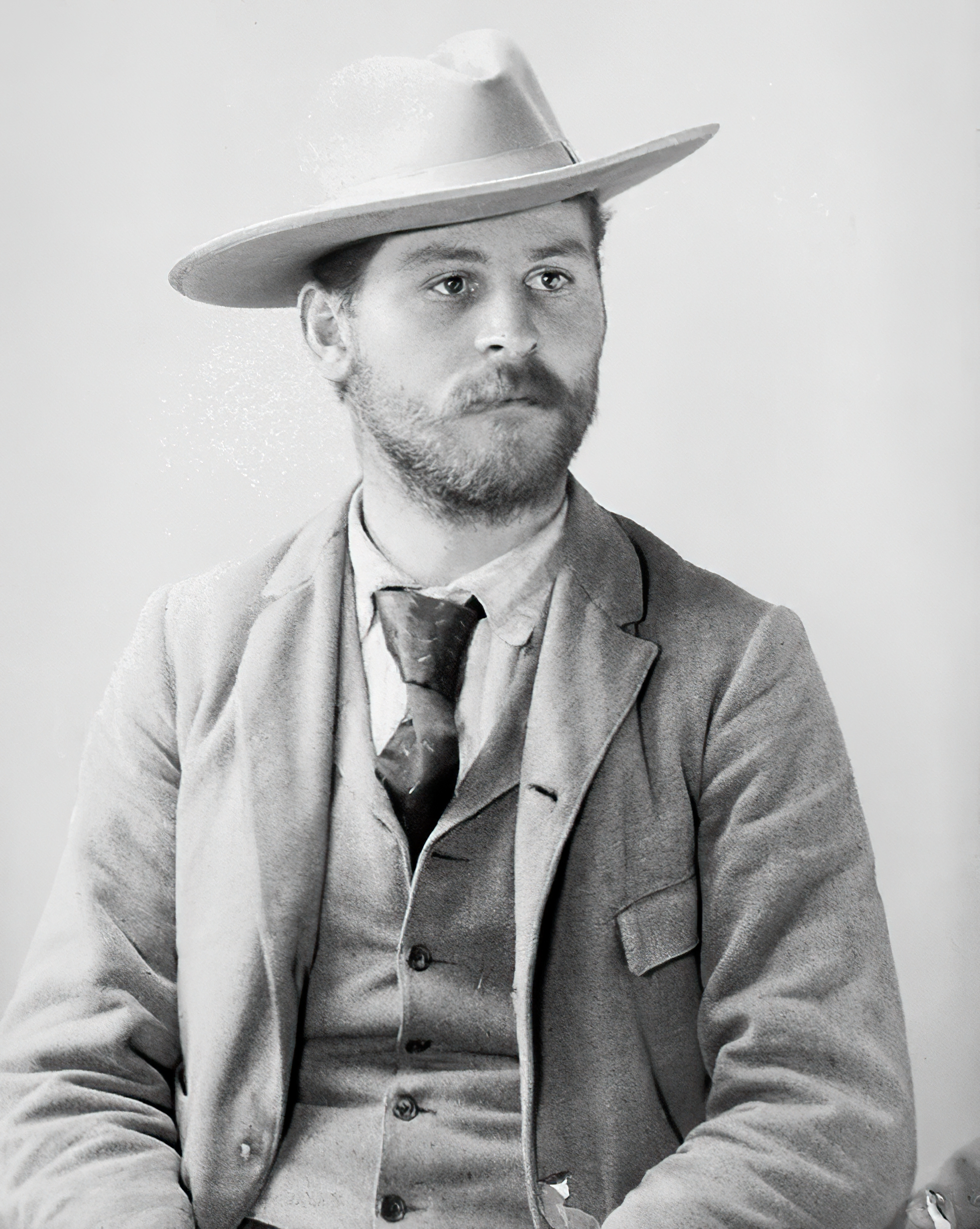
John A. Anderson (1890)

John Alvin Anderson (March 25, 1869 – June 26, 1948) was a Swedish-American photographer who spent most of his life in the United States. He is known for photographing Sioux people at the Rosebud Indian Reservation in South Dakota from 1885 until 1930. Many of his works are displayed at the Nebraska State Historical Society in Lincoln, Nebraska.

== Early life ==
Anderson was the sixth child born to Anders Salomon Gabrielsson and Anna-Beata Magnusdotter. The family farmed in present-day Vinberg-Ljungby, near Falkenberg, in Halland, Sweden. Gabrielsson spent time in the United States in 1869, earning money to send home, and in May of the following year, shortly after Anderson was born, the entire family emigrated to Pennsylvania. Magnusdotter died in 1876, and her widowed husband moved the family an area of Nebraska with a large Scandinavian immigrant population in 1883.

== Life and work ==
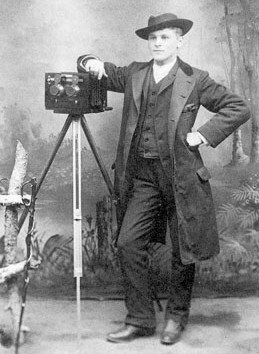
Anderson with a camera

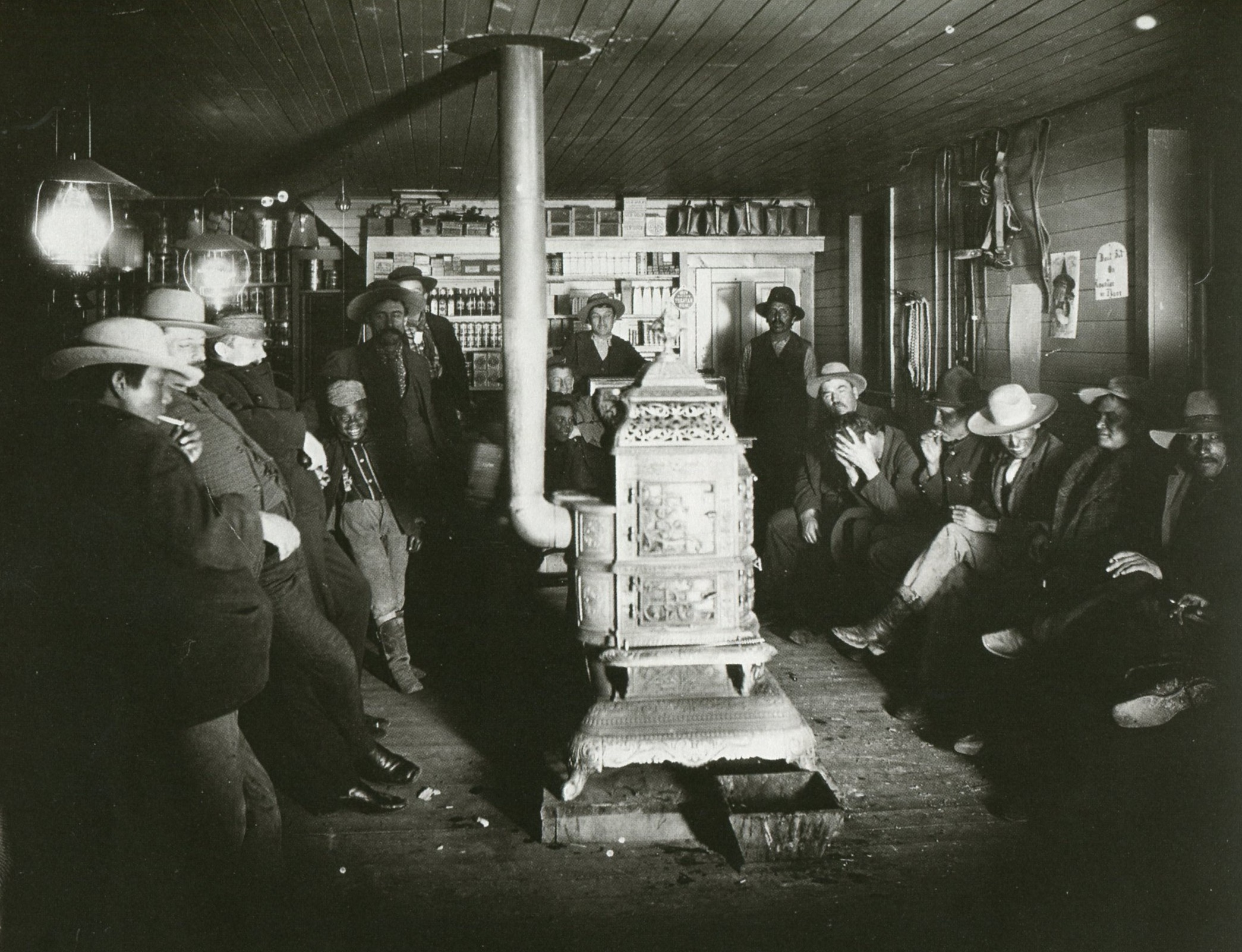
Charles Jordan's trading station, 1893

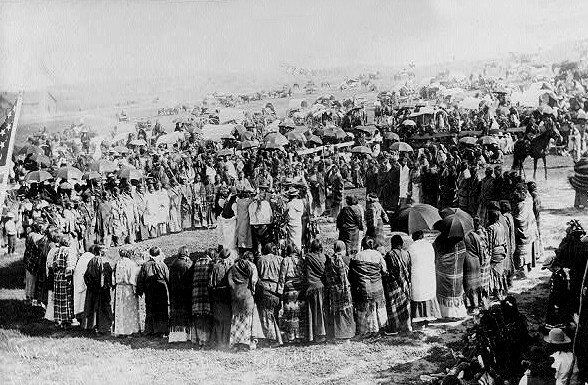
"Squaw dance at Rosebud Agency"

Anderson worked as a carpenter and spent some of his income on a Premo View camera, a high-quality brand at the time. His earliest photographs date back to about 1880. He assisted established photographer William Richard Cross (1839–1907) in taking photographs of soldiers at Fort Niobrara.

Anderson became close with members of the Sioux tribes during his time in Nebraska and nearby South Dakota, and so in 1889, General George Crook asked him to work as an official photographer during negotiations between the State and the Native Americans. These talks resulted in the creation of the Rosebud Indian Reservation. The following year, Anderson released his first book of photographs, Among the Sioux.

Outside of his role as a photographer, Anderson worked as a mediator between the State and the Sioux. During his time, he amassed various Indian arts and crafts, including vases, weapons, and jewelry. During the 1890s, he became part owner and postalier of the trading station operated by Indian agent Charles Philander Jordan (1856–1924) at the Rosebud Reservation. Anderson documented and photographed the Sioux, including members of the most influential tribal families, over the 45-year period between 1885 and 1930. Anderson's photographs included images of He Dog, Fool Bull, Iron Shell, and Crow Dog.

A 1928 fire partially destroyed Anderson's photographs, but that year also saw the release of his second book of photographs, Sioux Memory Gems, on which he was helped by his wife, Myrtle. He and his wife moved to Rapid City in 1937, for several years, he was a curator of the Sioux Indian Museum. After Anderson's death, his wife sold his photographs to a private collector for one hundred dollars. They were eventually donated to the Nebraska State Historical Society. Some of Anderson's photographs are also on display at the Sioux Indian Museum in Rapid City.

== Personal life ==
He married Myrtle Miller (1870–1961) in 1895, and their son, Harold, was born in 1897.

== Bibliography ==
- Among the Sioux (1890)
- Sioux Memory Gems (1929)

== Selected photographs ==
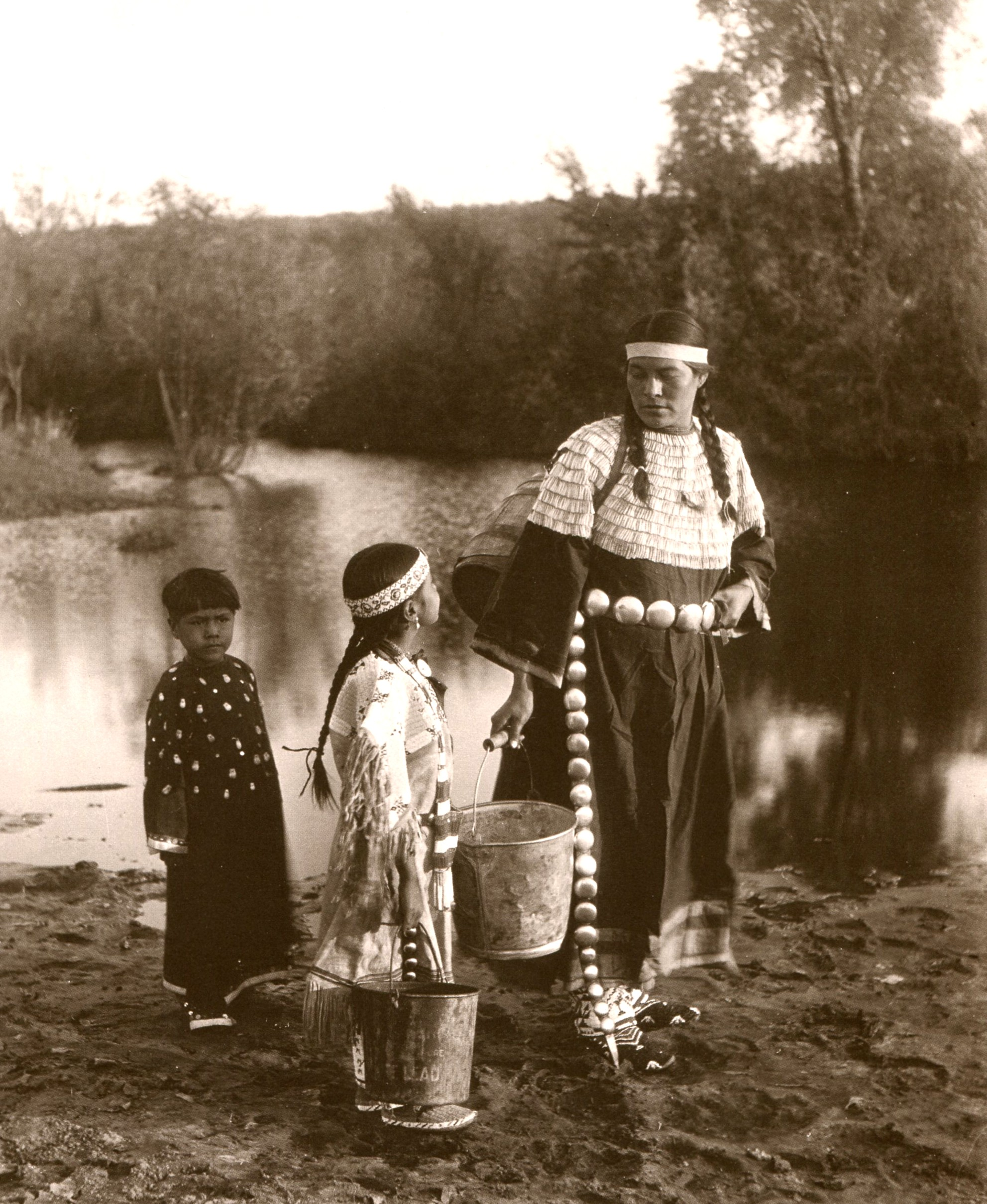
Sioux-women and children, 1900

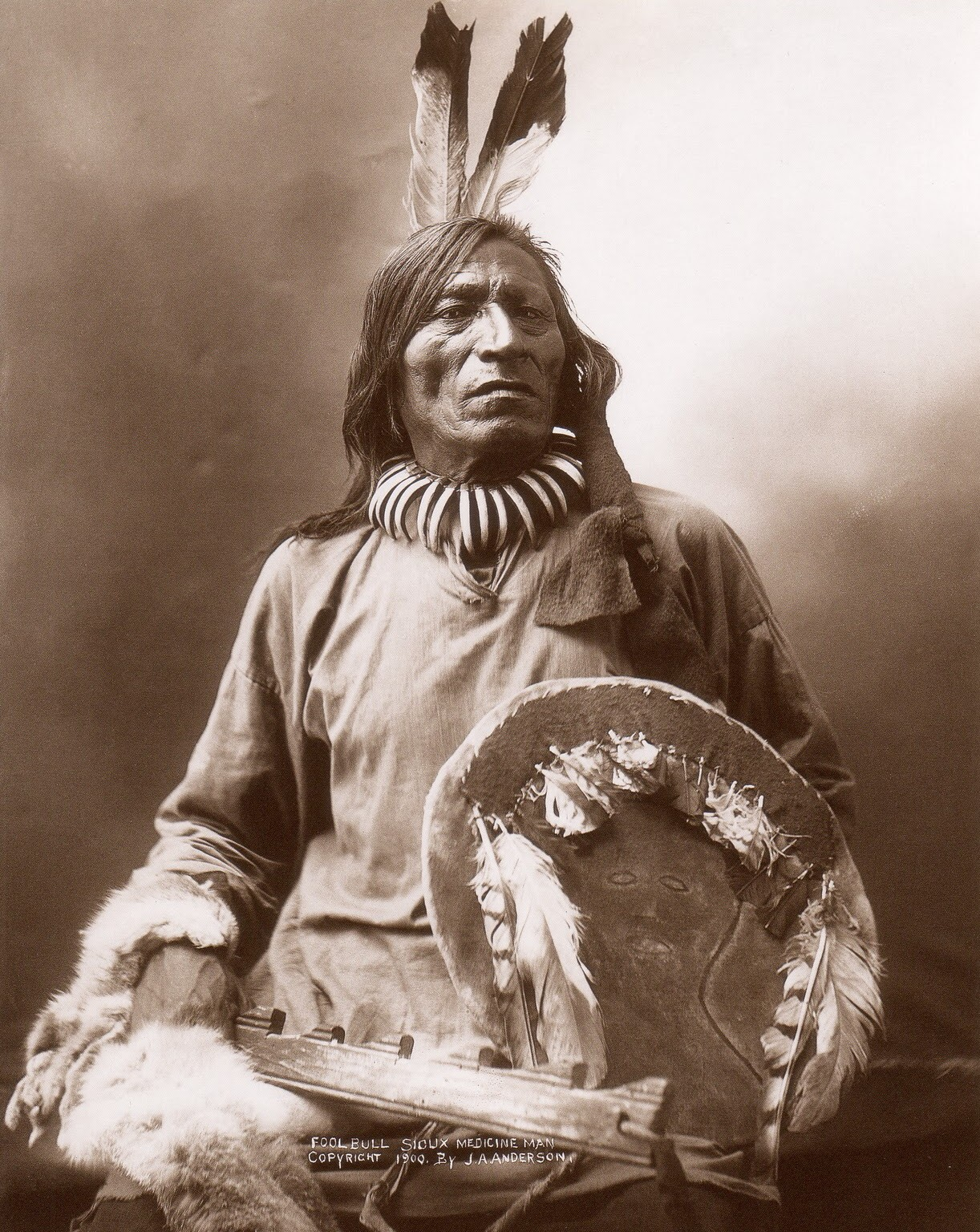
Fool Bull (1844–1909)

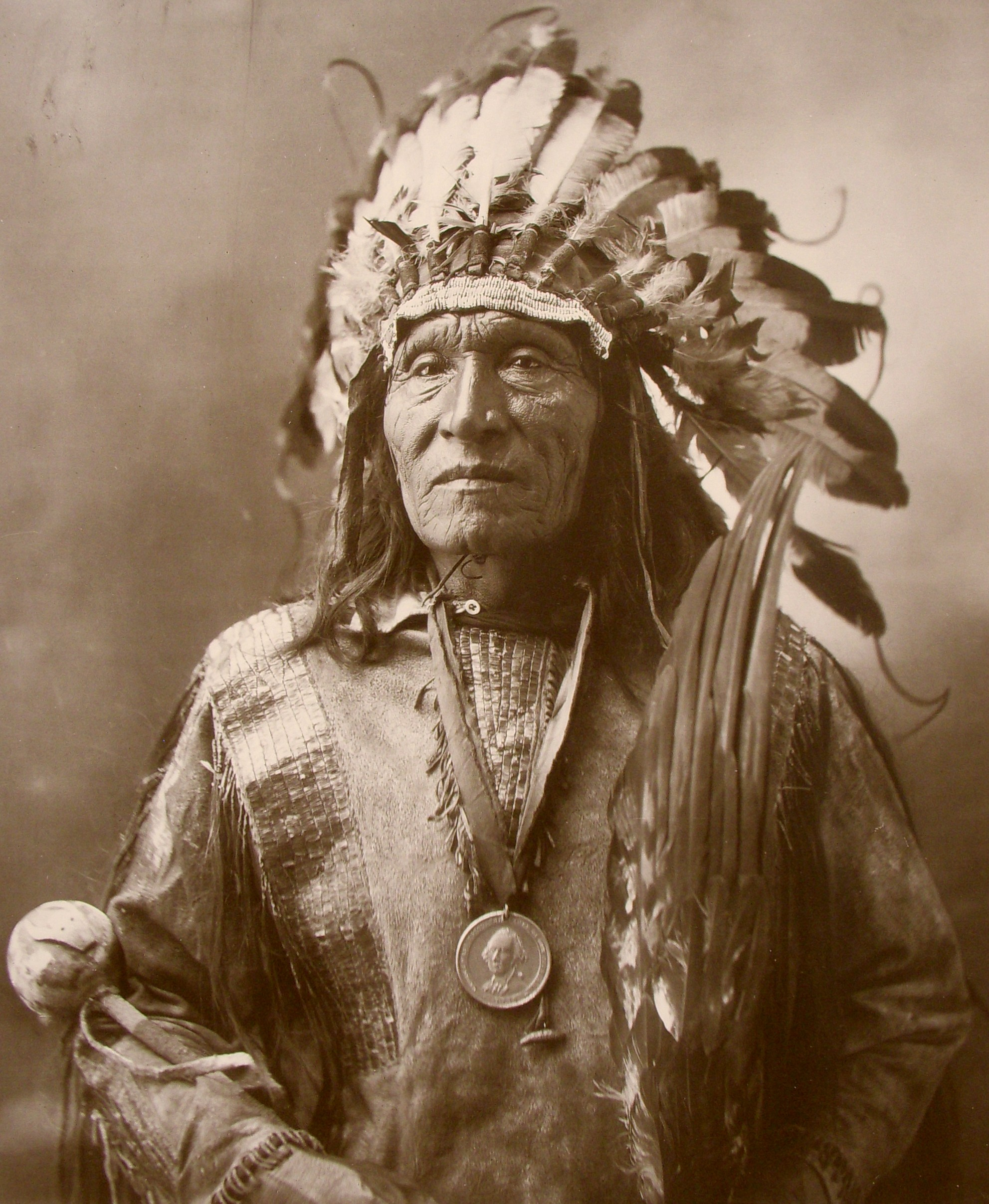
He Dog, Brulé (1836–1927)

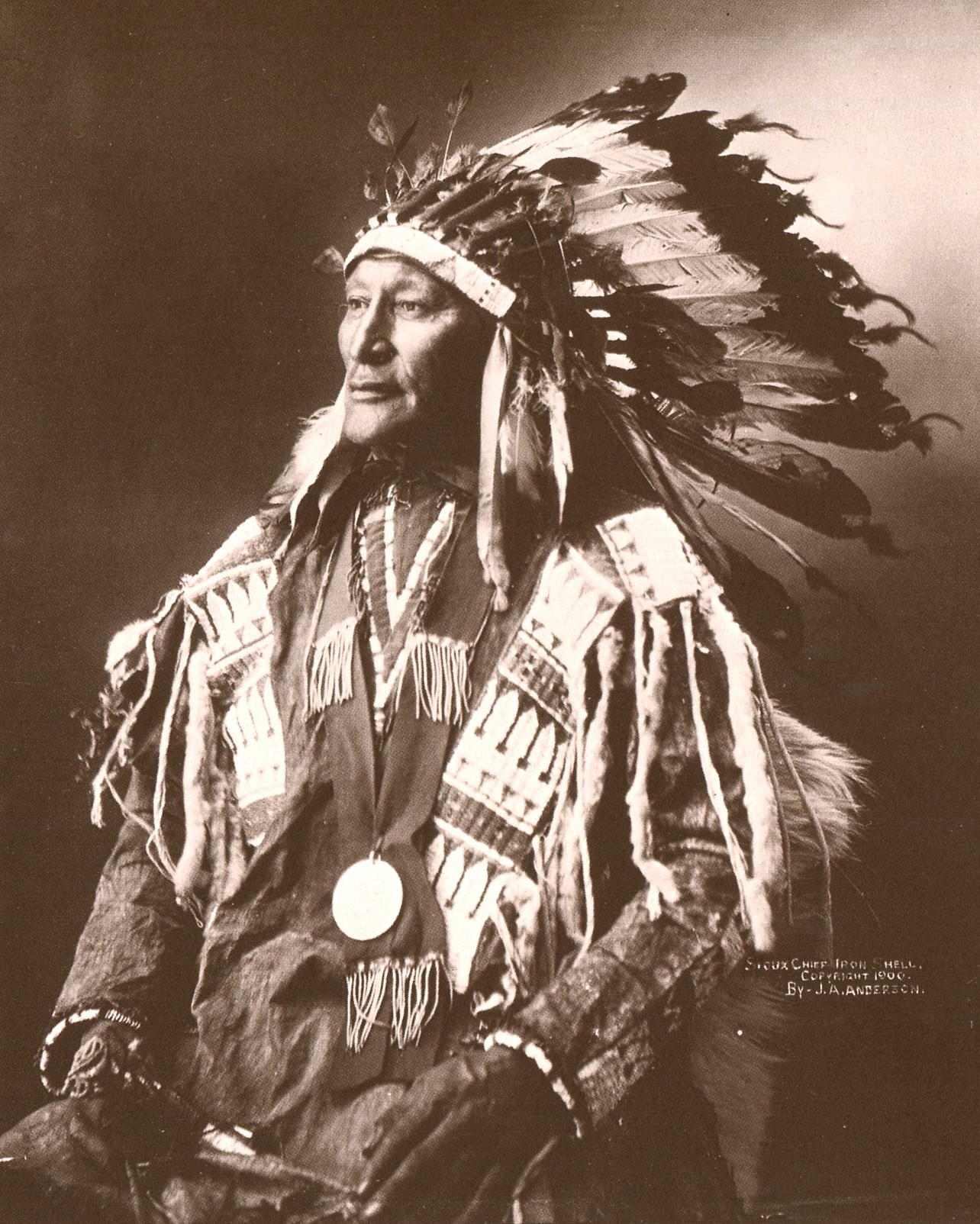
Iron Shell (1816–1896)
