= Rhodes (surname) =

Rhodes (also spelled Rhoades, Rhoads, Roads, Roades, and Rodes) is an English surname deriving from the Old English word "rod", meaning "a clearing in the woods". It arose as a locational surname for a person who either lived near woodland clearings, or was originally from one of many locations with the name, and is not connected to the Greek island of the same name. Topographical features provided intuitive and convenient means of identification in small medieval communities, and former inhabitants of a given location who moved to another town or area would often be identified using the name of their birthplace.

== Notable people with this surname ==
=== A–D ===
- Alan Rhodes (disambiguation), several people, including:
  - Alan Rhodes (rugby league), English rugby league footballer who played in the 1960s, 1970s and 1980s, and coached in the 1980s
  - Alan Rhodes (rugby league, born in Bradford), English rugby league footballer who played in the 1960s and 1970s, and coached in the 1980s
- Albert Rhodes (diplomat) (1840–1904), American diplomat and author
- Alex Rhodes (cyclist) (born 1984), female Australian racing cyclist
- Alex Rhodes (footballer), English footballer
- Alexandre de Rhodes, French Jesuit missionary
- Alexis Rhodes, fictional character in Yu-Gi-Oh! GX
- Amelia Atwater-Rhodes, American author
- Andy Rhodes, retired English football goalkeeper
- Anthony Rhodes, journalist and author of The Vatican in the Age of the Dictators
- April Rhodes, fictional character in Glee
- Arthur Rhodes (born 1969), Major League Baseball relief pitcher
- Arthur Rhodes (1859–1922), New Zealand Member of Parliament and Mayor of Christchurch
- Atticus Rhodes, fictional character in Yu-Gi-Oh! GX
- Augustus Rhodes (1821–1918), American judge in California
- Austin Rhodes, English rugby league footballer who played in the 1950s, 1960s and 1970s and coached in the 1970s
- Ben Rhodes (racing driver) (born 1997), American NASCAR driver
- Bernard Rhodes, former manager of The Clash
- Billy Rhodes (English rugby league), English rugby league footballer who played in the 1910s and 1920s, and coached in the 1920s through to the 1950s
- Carol Rhodes (1959–2018) Scottish painter
- CeCe Rhodes, fictional character in Gossip Girl
- Cecil Rhodes (disambiguation), several people, including:
  - Cecil Rhodes (1853–1902), British businessman after whom Rhodesia was named, theorist of imperialism, creator of the Rhodes Scholarship
- Christopher Rhodes, former British film and television actor
- Cody Rhodes (born 1985; birth name Cody Runnels), American professional wrestler and son of wrestler Dusty Rhodes
- Cynthia Rhodes, American actress, singer and dancer
- Damian Rhodes (born 1969), retired NHL goaltender
- Dan Rhodes, English writer
- David Rhodes (disambiguation), several people, including:
  - Dave Rhodes, purported author of the electronic chain letter "Make.Money.Fast"
  - David Rhodes (author), American novelist
  - David Rhodes (cricketer), English-born New Zealand cricketer
  - David Rhodes (footballer), former Australian rules footballer
  - David Rhodes (kayaker), Australian sprint canoeist
- Dominic Rhodes, running back in the National Football League
- Donnelly Rhodes, Canadian television actor
- Doralee Rhodes, fictional character in Nine to Five
- Doris Rhodes (1898–1982), British bridge player
- Doris Lindsey Holland Rhodes (1909–1997), American politician
- Doug Rhodes, multi-instrumentalist
- Dustin Rhodes (born 1969; real name Dustin Runnels), American professional wrestler also known as Goldust; son of wrestler Dusty Rhodes
- Dusty Rhodes (baseball coach) (born 1946), American college baseball coach
- Dusty Rhodes (cricketer) (1916–1983), English cricket player and umpire
- Dusty Rhodes (footballer) (1882–1960), English footballer and manager
- Dusty Rhodes (outfielder) (1927–2009), American baseball player
- Dusty Rhodes (1945–2015; real name Virgil Runnels Jr.), American professional wrestler and father of Cody and Dustin Rhodes

=== E–J ===
- E. C. Rhodes, statistician and economist who worked with Arthur Bowley and Karl Pearson
- Edgar Nelson Rhodes, Canadian parliamentarian and premier of Nova Scotia
- Elisha Hunt Rhodes, Brigadier General in the Union Army
- Emitt Rhodes (1950–2020), American singer/songwriter
- Erica Rhodes, American actress and comedian
- Erik Rhodes (actor, born 1906), American actor
- Erik Rhodes (pornographic actor), American pornographic actor
- Ernie Rhodes, English footballer
- Esther Biddle Rhoads (1896–1979), American educator, relief worker
- Frank Rhodes (British Army officer) (1851–1905), brother of Cecil, 19th century British Army Colonel in Africa
- Frank H. T. Rhodes, president of Cornell University
- Gary Rhodes (1960–2019), English celebrity chef and restaurateur
- George Rhodes (farmer) (1816–1864), New Zealand pastoralist
- George Rhodes (musician), American arranger, conductor, pianist, and music director
- Happy Rhodes, American singer, songwriter, instrumentalist and electronic musician
- Hari Rhodes, American actor
- Harold Rhodes (disambiguation), several people
- Heaton Rhodes (1861–1956), New Zealand politician and lawyer
- Captain Henry Rhodes, fictional character in Day of the Dead
- Herbert Rhodes, English cricketer
- Herbert W. Rhodes, American architect
- Hervey Rhodes, Baron Rhodes (1895–1987), British Labour Party politician
- Ida Rhodes, mathematician
- Izora Rhodes, Izora Armstead; one half of the pop group the Weather Girls
- James Rhodes (disambiguation), several people
  - James Rhodes (cricketer), English cricketer
  - James Rhodes (pianist) (born 1975), English pianist
  - James Ford Rhodes, American industrialist and historian
- Jane Rhodes (1929–2011), French opera singer
- Jay B. Rhodes, American inventor
- Jean Rhodes, American academic psychologist and author
- Jennifer Rhodes, American actress
- Jewell Parker Rhodes, American novelist
- Jim Rhodes, four-term governor of Ohio
- John Harold Rhodes, English recipient of the Victoria Cross
- John Jacob Rhodes III, former Republican representative
- John Jacob Rhodes, American politician and lawyer
- John Rhodes (racing driver), British former racing driver
- John W. Rhodes, former Republican member of the North Carolina General Assembly
- Jonty Rhodes, former South African cricketer
- Jordan Rhodes, Scottish footballer

=== K–Z ===
- Kay Rhodes, American bridge player
- Kerry Rhodes, American football safety
- Kim Rhode, American double trap and skeet shooter
- Kim Rhodes, American actress
- Kristin Rhodes, Professional Strongwoman, Worlds Strongest Woman
- La Mott W. Rhodes (1843–1890), American lawyer and politician
- Lancelot Barrie Rhodes, (1934–2021) New Zealand musician
- Leah Rhodes, former American costume designer
- Lou Rhodes, English singer and songwriter
- Lucinda Rhodes-Flaherty, British television and film actress
- Luke Rhodes (born 1992), American football player
- The Honourable Margaret Rhodes, first cousin and close friend of Queen Elizabeth II
- Marjorie Rhodes (1897–1979), British actress of motion pictures and television
- Mark Rhodes (disambiguation), several people
- Mary Louise Rhodes (1916–1987), American petroleum geologist,
- Mel Rhodes, creativity researcher and originator of the 4 P of creativity
- Michael Rhodes (disambiguation), several people
- Nick Rhodes, the English keyboardist for Duran Duran
- P. J. Rhodes (1940–2021), British academic and ancient historian
- Pam Rhodes, British television presenter
- Paul Rhodes, Canadian political strategist
- Pauline Rhodes (born 1937), New Zealand artist
- Peter Rhodes, former American journalist
- Peyton Nelle Rhodes, 15th president and namesake of Rhodes College in Memphis, Tennessee
- Philip Rhodes, prolific boat designer who designed the 1962 America's Cup winner, Weatherly
- Phillip Rhodes (drummer), drummer for the Gin Blossoms
- Quincy Rhodes Jr. (born 2004), American football player
- Randi Rhodes, talk radio host
- Ray Rhodes, former American football head coach
- Richard Rhodes (born 1937), American author, notably of Deadly Feasts about prion diseases, and of The Making of the Atomic Bomb
- Robert Heaton Rhodes (1815–1884), New Zealand politician
- Rufus N. Rhodes, founder of the Birmingham News, and vice-president of the Associated Press
- Rufus R. Rhodes, Chief Clerk of the Confederate Patent Office, 1861–1865
- Sarah Rhodes (1787–1862), illustrator
- Stephen Rhodes (radio presenter), former weekday daytime presenter on BBC Three Counties Radio
- Steve Rhodes, former English cricketer
- Teddy Tahu Rhodes (born 1966), New Zealand bass-baritone
- Thomas L. Rhodes (1939–2018), American political editor and president of National Review magazine
- Trevante Rhodes (born 1990), American sportsman in track and fields and film and television actor
- Trevor Rhodes (disambiguation), several people
- Tuffy Rhodes (born 1968), American professional baseball player
- Walter Rhodes (musician), American blues musician
- Wilfred Rhodes, former English cricketer
- William Rhodes (disambiguation), several people
- Xavier Rhodes, American Football Cornerback for the Indianapolis Colts
- Zandra Rhodes, English fashion designer

== See also ==
- Rhoades (surname)
- Rhoads (surname)
- Roads (surname)
- Justice Rhodes (disambiguation)
- Rhodes (disambiguation)
- Rhode (disambiguation)
- Robert E. Rodes, Confederate general in the American Civil War
- Istok Rodeš, Croatian alpine ski racer
- Rohde
