= Rhodes (disambiguation) =

Rhodes is the Greek Dodecanese island where the Colossus of Rhodes stood.

Rhodes may also refer to:

== Places and jurisdictions ==
=== Europe ===
- Rhodes (regional unit), Greece
  - Rhodes (city), the main settlement on the island of Rhodes, Dodecanese, Greece
- Rhodes, Moselle, a commune of the Moselle department, France
- Rhodes, Greater Manchester, a village in England
- Appenzell Ausserrhoden, a canton in Switzerland also known as Appenzell Outer Rhodes
- Appenzell Innerrhoden, a canton in Switzerland also known as Appenzell Inner Rhodes

=== United States ===
- Rhode Island, a state
- Rhodes, Indiana, an unincorporated community
- Rhodes, Iowa, a city
- Rhodes Hill, a summit of Savage Mountain, Maryland
- Rhodes, Michigan, an unincorporated community
- Rhodes, Montana, a census-designated place

=== Elsewhere ===
- Rhodes Memorial, a monument in Cape Town, South Africa, for Cecil John Rhodes built on his former estate
- Rhodes, South Africa, a small tourist town in Eastern Cape
- Rhodes, New South Wales, suburb in Sydney, Australia

== People ==
- Rhodes (surname)
- Rhodes (singer), stagename of David Rhodes, a British musician, singer and songwriter
- Cecil John Rhodes, important 19th century English and South African politician, founder of the monopolistic De Beers diamond company
  - Rhodes of Africa, a 1936 film about his life

== Arts, entertainment, and media ==
- Fender Rhodes piano, an electric piano invented by Harold Rhodes
- Mr. Rhodes, an American television sitcom
- Rhodes (TV series), a 1996 British television series about the life of Cecil Rhodes
- Rhodes Singers, concert choir of Rhodes College in Memphis, Tennessee
- Rhodes, a fictional town in the video game Red Dead Redemption 2
- Rhodes Island, a fictional organization in the video game Arknights

== Brands and enterprises ==
- Rhodes Brothers, a department store in Tacoma, WA
- Rhodes Furniture, defunct American furniture retailer
- Rhodes Fruit Farms, founded by Cecil John Rhodes in 1902

== Education ==
- Rhodes College, a college in Memphis, Tennessee
- Rhodes Preparatory School, formerly in Manhattan, New York City
- Rhodes Scholarship, an international postgraduate award for students to study at the University of Oxford
- Rhodes State College, a college in Lima, Ohio named after James A. Rhodes
- Rhodes University, a college in Grahamstown, South Africa

== Grapes ==
- Rhodes (grape), a synonym for the Athiri grape used to make Retsina on the Island of Rhodes
- Rhoditis, a pink-skinned Greek wine grape often blended into Retsina

== Other ==
- Metropolis of Rhode, the Greek Orthodox metropolitan see covering the island of Rhodes
- Rhodes Framework, a framework for developing smartphone applications
- Rhodes Trail Run, a 52 km trail run that takes place in the southern Drakensberg of South Africa
- Rhodes grass (Chloris gayana), a species of grass native to Africa but found throughout the tropical and subtropical world
- USS Rhodes (1943–1963), a U.S. Navy destroyer escort

== See also ==
- Rhodesia (disambiguation)
- Justice Rhodes (disambiguation)
- Rhoades, a surname
- Rodès, a commune in Pyrénées-Orientales department, France
- Rhoads, a surname
- Road (disambiguation)
- Rhode (disambiguation)
- Rhode Island (disambiguation)
- Rode (disambiguation)
- Rodos (disambiguation)
