= James Rhodes =

James or Jim Rhodes is the name of:

- James Rhodes (pianist) (born 1975), English-Spanish pianist
- James Rhodes, a comic book superhero also known as War Machine
  - James Rhodes (Marvel Cinematic Universe), the film version of the character
- James Ford Rhodes (1848–1927), American historian and industrialist
- James Rhodes (cricketer) (1866–1939), English cricketer
- James Henry Rhodes (born 1930), print shop owner and political figure in British Columbia
- James Melvin Rhodes (1916–1976), American educational scientist
- Jim Rhodes (1909–2001), American politician, governor of Ohio
- Jim Rhodes (developer) (born 1958), American real estate developer
- Jim Rhodes (golfer) (1946–2015), English golfer
- Dusty Rhodes (outfielder) (James Rhodes, 1927–2009), American baseball player

== See also ==
- James A. Rhodes Arena, Akron, Ohio, United States
- James A. Rhodes State College, Lima, Allen County, Ohio, United States
- James Ford Rhodes High School, Cleveland, Ohio, United States
