= The Road (disambiguation) =

The Road is a 2006 novel by the American author Cormac McCarthy.

The Road may also refer to:

== Film and television ==
- The Road, a 1959 Hong Kong film directed by Ng Wui
- The Road (1967 film), a Taiwanese film and winner of the Golden Horse Award for Best Feature Film
- The Road (TV play), a 1963 BBC TV play by Nigel Kneale
  - The Road (1964 TV play), an Australian remake of Kneale's play
  - The Road, a 2018 BBC radio version of Kneale's play, adapted by Toby Hadoke
- The Road (2001 film), a Kazakh film
- The Road (2009 film), an adaptation of the McCarthy novel, directed by John Hillcoat
- The Road (2011 film), a Filipino film
- The Road (2015 film), a Lebanese film
- The Road (2023 film), an Indian Tamil-language film
- The Road (TV series), a music reality show on CBS
- La Strada, literally The Road, a 1954 film by Federico Fellini

== Literature ==
- The Road (London book), a 1907 memoir by Jack London
- The Road, or The Ten Commandments, a 1931 novel by Warwick Deeping
- The Road (Anand novel), a 1961 novel by Mulk Raj Anand
- The Road, a 1965 play by Wole Soyinka
- The Road: Stories, Journalism, and Essays, a 1987 book by Vasily Grossman
- The Road, a 2010 novel in the Being Human series by Simon Guerrier
- The Road: A Graphic Novel Adaptation, a 2024 comic book by Manu Larcenet, based on McCarthy's novel

== Music ==
- The Road (group), a late 60s group from Buffalo, New York

=== Albums ===
- The Road (Mike + The Mechanics album), 2011
- The Road (Tricia Brock album), 2011
- The Road (Aaron Lewis album), 2012
- The Road (Unkle album), 2017
- The Road (Super Junior album), 2022

=== Songs ===
- "The Road" (The Kinks song), 1988
- "The Road" (Auktyon song), 1993
- "The Road", a 1977 song by Jackson Browne from Running on Empty
- "The Road", a 1980 song by Jon and Vangelis from Short Stories
- "The Road", a 1984 song by Mark Knopfler from Cal
- "The Road", a 1991 song by the Levellers from Levelling the Land
- "The Road", a 2001 song by Tenacious D from Tenacious D
- "The Road", a 2004 song by Matt Costa from A Brokedown Melody
- "The Road", a 2004 song by Superheist
- "The Road", a 2009 song by Frank Turner from Poetry of the Deed
- "The Road", a 2014 song by Alistair Griffin from From Nowhere
- "The Road", a 2020 song by Faouzia

== Roads ==
- The Road (Saba), a road on the Caribbean island of Saba

== See also ==
- On the Road (disambiguation)
- Road (disambiguation)
- Roud (disambiguation)
