= Rhoads (surname) =

Rhoads is a surname, and may refer to:

- Ann Fowler Rhoads (born 1938), American botanist
- Bob Rhoads (1879–1967), American baseball pitcher
- Cornelius P. Rhoads (1898–1959), American pathologist and oncologist
- Daniel Rhoads (1821–1895), American pioneer and rancher
- David Rhoads (1932–2017), American Olympic cyclist
- Dean Rhoads (born 1935), American politician from Nevada
- Dorothy Rhoads (1895–1986), American writer of children's literature
- Esther Biddle Rhoads (1896–1979), American educator and relief worker
- Fred Rhoads (1921–2000), American cartoonist
- George Rhoads (1926–2021), American artist, designer of rolling ball sculptures
- James Rhoads (1828—1895), American educator and college president
- James B. Rhoads (1928–2015), American archivist
- Jence Ann Rhoads (born 1988), American handball player
- Jerry Rhoads (born 1941), American politician from Kentucky
- Jonathan Rhoads (1907–2002), American surgeon
- Kait Rhoads (born 1968), American glass artist
- Karl Rhoads (born 1963), American politician and lawyer from Hawaii
- K.S. Rhoads (born 1976), American musician
- Loren Rhoads (born 1963), American author
- Paul Rhoads (born 1967), American football coach
- Rhonda Rhoads (born 1950), American politician from Indiana
- Ronald Rhoads (born 1933), American Olympic cyclist
- Ross Rhoads (1932–2017), American pastor
- Randy Rhoads (1956–1982), American rock guitarist
- Samuel Rhoads (1711–1784), American architect, Mayor of Philadelphia
- Sara Jane Rhoads (1920–1993), American chemist
- Shawn Rhoads (born 1977), American politician from Missouri
- Steven Rhoads, American politician from New York State
- Terry Rhoads (1951–2013), American television actor
- Thomas Rhoads (1796–1869), American frontiersman
- William Rhoads (born 1995), American ski jumper

== See also ==
- Rhoades (surname)
- Roads (surname)
- Rhodes (surname)
- Thomas Rhoad Jr. (1923–2013), American farmer and politician
