= Rode =

Rode may refer to:

== People ==
- Ajmer Rode, Canadian writer
- Bernd Michael Rode (1946–2022), Austrian chemistry professor
- Bernhard Rode (1725–1797), German painter
- Ebbe Rode (1910–1998), Danish stage and film actor
- Franc Rode (born 1934), Slovenian cardinal
- Gautam Rode (born 1977), Indian actor
- Srishty Rode (born 1991), Indian actress
- Hans Henrik Rode (1767–1830), Norwegian military officer
- Helge Rode (1870–1973), Danish writer, critic and journalist
- Hermen Rode (before 1465 – after 1504), German painter
- Nina Pens Rode (1929–1992), Danish actress
- Ove Rode (1867–1933), Danish politician
- Pierre Rode (1774–1830), French violinist
- Sebastian Rode (born 1990), German footballer

== Places ==
- Rode, Somerset, England
- Rode Heath, Cheshire, England
- Carleton Rode, Norfolk, England
- North Rode, Cheshire, England
- Odd Rode, Cheshire, England
- Sint-Genesius-Rode, Flanders, Belgium
- Rode, a village near Moga, Punjab, India

== Structures ==
- Rode Hall, Cheshire, England

== Companies ==
- Røde Microphones, manufacturer of audio equipment based in Australia

== Other ==
- Marquess of Rode, a former noble title in Belgium
- Rode, a cable, chain or rope, especially one attached to the anchor of a small boat.

== See also ==
- Road (disambiguation)
- Roder (disambiguation), placename and surname
- Rhode (disambiguation)
- Rhodes (disambiguation)
- Rhode Island (disambiguation)
