= Rhode =

Rhode may refer to:

== Greek mythology and literature ==
- Rhodos, goddess and personification of the island of Rhodes
- Rhode, one of the fifty daughters of Danaus
- Rhode (Hermas), a central character in The Shepherd of Hermas

== Places ==
- Rhode, a suburb of Olpe, Germany
- Rhode, County Offaly, Ireland, a town
- Rhode, now Roses, Girona, Spain
- Rhode River, Maryland, United States

== Other uses ==
- Rhode (brand), a skincare brand founded by Hailey Bieber
- Rhode (surname)
- Rhode (spider), a genus of spiders

== See also ==
- Rhode Island, the smallest U.S. state by area
- Road (disambiguation)
- Rode (disambiguation)
- Rhodes (disambiguation)
- Rhode Island (disambiguation)
- Rohde
