= Rodos =

Rodos or Ródos may refer to:

- Rhodes, an island in Greece
  - Rhodes (city)
- Rodos (operating system), a real-time operating system
- Rodos Colossi RFC, a rugby union club based in Rhodes, Greece
- Rodos F.C., a football club based in Rhodes, Greece
- HS Ródos (L157), an American-built landing craft, transferred to the Royal Hellenic Navy in 1960
- MV Ródos, a Greek cruise ship which formerly served in the United States Navy as USS Timbalier

== See also ==
- Rhodes (disambiguation)
