= Rhoades (surname) =

Rhoades is a surname, and may refer to:

- Barbara Rhoades (born 1947), American actress
- Cornelius Rhoades (1892–?), American baseball player
- Crystal Rhoades (born 1978), American politician
- Darryl Rhoades (born 1950), American musician and comedian
- Elijah Rhoades (1791–1858), New York politician
- Elizabeth Rhoades, American biophysicist
- Galena K. Rhoades, American clinical psychologist and academic
- Geoffrey Rhoades (1898–1980), British painter
- James Rhoades (1841–1923), Anglo-Irish poet, translator and author
- James J. Rhoades (1941–2008), American politician from Pennsylvania
- Jason Rhoades (1965–2006), American installation artist
- Jessica Rhoades, American television producer
- John Rhoades, 17th-century fur trader from New England
- John Skylstead Rhoades Sr. (1925–2007), American judge
- Katharine Rhoades, (1885–1964), American painter
- Kevin C. Rhoades (born 1957), American Catholic bishop
- Kitty Rhoades (1951–2016), American politician from Wisconsin
- Lana Rhoades, American pornographic film actress
- Lisa Rhoades (born 1963), American poet
- Mack Rhoades (born 1965), American college athletics administrator
- Marc Rhoades (born 1961), American politician from Kansas
- Marcus Morton Rhoades (1903–1991), American cytogeneticist
- Matt Rhoades (born 1975), American political and public affairs consultant
- Mike Rhoades (born 1972), American basketball coach
- Paul Ezra Rhoades (1957–2011), American spree killer executed in Idaho
- Peter Rhoades-Brown (born 1962), English footballer
- Rick Rhoades (born 1947), American football coach
- Rion Rhoades (born 1975), American college football coach
- Robert Ben Rhoades (born 1945), American serial killer also known as "The Truck Stop Killer"
- Sarah Rhoades from America's Next Top Model, Cycle 5
- Shirrel Rhoades (born 1942), American writer, filmmaker and academic
- Stephanie Rhoades, American judge in Alaska

== See also ==
- Rhodes (surname)
- Rhoads (surname)
- Roads (surname)
