= Jay Rhodes =

Jay Rhodes may refer to:

- Jay B. Rhodes, American inventor
- Jay Rhodes (politician), American politician from Arizona
