= Janet Brown Guernsey =

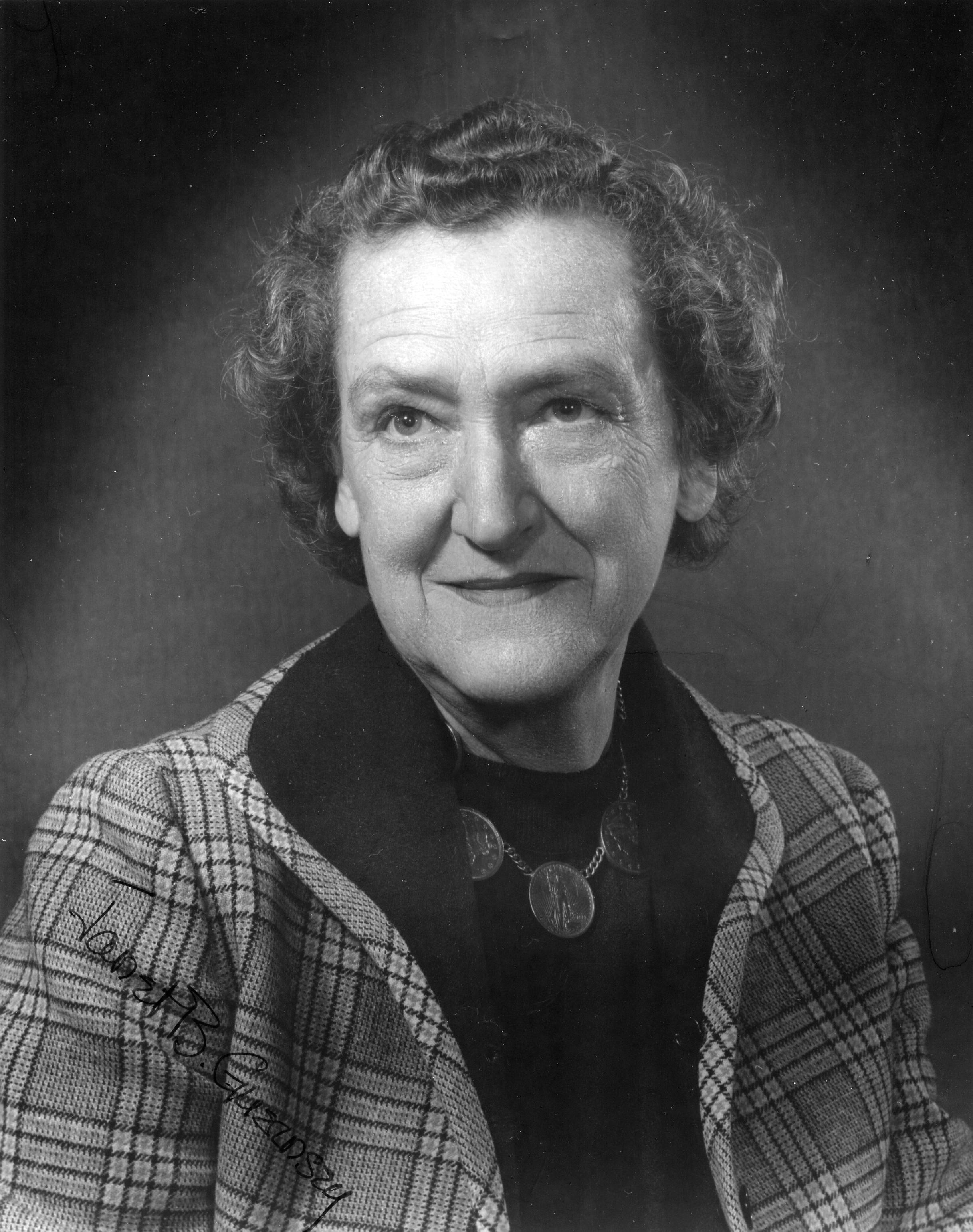
- Born: March 2, 1913; Philadelphia, Pennsylvania, U.S.
- Died: August 26, 2001 (aged 88)
- Education: Wellesley College, B.A. 1935; Harvard University, M.A. 1948; Massachusetts Institute of Technology, Ph.D. 1955
- Scientific career
- Fields: Nuclear Physics
- Workplaces: Wellesley College

Janet Brown Guernsey, born Janet Brown (March 2, 1913 – August 26, 2001), was a professor of physics at Wellesley College. She was active in the American Association of Physics Teachers and served as President from 1975 to 1976.

== Early life and education ==
Janet Brown Guernsey was born in Philadelphia, Pennsylvania, in 1913. She attended the coeducational Germantown Friends School from kindergarten through high school. She fell in love with physics after reading a science article in 8th grade about how the telephone worked. Guernsey decided to go to Wellesley College, inspired by her sister who had attended the same school.

At Wellesley College, Guernsey majored in physics, receiving her B.A. in 1935. After graduation she became an apprentice teacher at Baldwin School in Bryn Mawr, Pennsylvania, where she taught labs, but decided not to take the job permanently as she did not think she would work after marriage. She married William Guernsey, in 1936. He was working at a law firm in Boston, and had graduated from Harvard Law School. They had children, and Guernsey did not work outside the home until she got bored.

== Career ==
In 1942 she took a "radio" (electronics) course at Wellesley, since she was living there and she thought it would give her a part-time job at Wellesley. She was told that she needed at least one more degree if she wanted to stay as faculty. So she took a Physics class at Harvard and got her master's degree in 1948 in Engineering and Applied Physics, while continuing her teaching at Wellesley. She wanted to do her PhD at Harvard; however in 1948 Harvard professor Theodore Hunt told Guernsey, mother of five and teacher at Wellesley, to become a full-time student if she wanted to continue beyond her master's degree. Recognizing this infeasibility, she went to MIT, where the physics department let her be a part-time student for several years. By working on her dissertation at night, she finally finished in 1955, just in time to get tenure at Wellesley.

Before the 1950s, most women faculty members at the women's colleges were required to resign their positions upon marriage. Janet Guernsey was perhaps the first assistant professor at Wellesley who was married and also a mother of five. Andrea Kundsin Dupree, later president of the American Astronomical Society, recalled Guernsey as "a marvelous physics teacher" and a particular influence from her undergraduate years.

Guernsey was active in the American Association of Physics Teachers. In 1973 she was elected vice president of the association, a position which would be followed by a year as president-elect and then a year as president. Guernsey succeeded Sherwood K. Haynes of Michigan State University as president in 1975-76. She was the second female president of the Association following Melba Phillips. Guernsey was also instrumental in restarting the New England Section of the Association, which has named an award for an outstanding high school or college physics teacher in her honor.
