= Mark Rhodes (disambiguation) =

Mark Rhodes may refer to:

- Mark Rhodes, British pop singer and television presenter
- Mark Rhodes (artist), American artist, associate professor of Sculpture/Ceramics at University of Richmond
- Mark Rhodes (footballer), English former professional footballer
