= Germantown Friends School =

Private prep school in Pennsylvania, US

Coordinates: 40.03278°N 75.17167°W

- 31 West Coulter Street; Germantown, Philadelphia, Pennsylvania

Information
- Type: Private, day, college preparatory
- Motto: Behold, I have set before thee an open door.
- Religious affiliation: Christianity
- Denomination: Quakers
- Established: 1845; 181 years ago
- Head of school: Dana Weeks
- Faculty: 87 full-time 24 part-time
- Grades: Pre-Kindergarten-12
- Gender: Co-educational
- Enrollment: 1021
- Student to teacher ratio: 5:1
- Campus type: Urban
- Colors: Navy, White, Orange
- Athletics: 65 Athletic teams
- Athletics conference: Friends School League
- Mascot: Tiger
- Nickname: Tigers
- Tuition: $25,750–$48,850 (2025-26)
- Website: germantownfriends.org

Germantown Friends School (GFS) is a private, coeducational Preschool–12 school, founded in 1845. Its campus is located in the Germantown neighborhood of Philadelphia, Pennsylvania. The school is under the care of the Germantown Monthly Meeting of the Religious Society of Friends (Quakers) and is governed by a School Committee whose members are drawn from the Meeting membership, the school's alumni, and parents of current students and alums. The head of school is Dana Weeks.

== History ==
Germantown Friends School was founded in 1845 by Germantown Monthly Meeting in response to a request from the Philadelphia Yearly Meeting. Until the early 20th century, Germantown Friends was a "select" school, meaning that only the children of Quaker parents were admitted. Germantown Monthly Meeting was an Orthodox meeting and valued classical education. Athletics and the arts were considered a diversion from the essentials young people needed.

== Notable alumni ==
This list includes graduates and non-graduate former students. (Note: See also Category:Germantown Friends School alumni)

- Emily Bazelon, 1989, journalist
- Eric Bazilian, 1971, musician and songwriter
- Jesse Biddle, 2010, baseball player
- Sandra Boynton, 1970, cartoonist and songwriter
- Sarah Chang, violinist
- Owen Chamberlain, 1937, physicist
- Walter Cope, architect
- Erica Armstrong Dunbar, 1990, historian and author, National Book Award Finalist
- Garrett Dutton III, aka G. Love, 1991, musician and front man of the band G. Love & Special Sauce
- Jennifer Fox (born 1959), film producer, director, cinematographer
- Michael Friedman, 1993, composer
- Janet Brown Guernsey, 1931, physicist
- Nathaniel Kahn, 1981, filmmaker, writer and director of My Architect, a film about his father, Louis Kahn
- Rob Monster, Dutch-American technology executive.
- Tom Myers, 1976, sound engineer nominated for two Academy Awards.
- Saul Perlmutter, 1977, astrophysicist; winner of the 2011 Nobel Prize in Physics for his work on the accelerating universe
- Edmund R. Purves, 1914, architect and executive director of the American Institute of Architects.
- Esther Biddle Rhoads, educator, relief worker
- Merrie Spaeth, Political public relations consultant; appeared in the film The World of Henry Orient while a sophomore at GFS.
- Daniel Spielman, 1988, Sterling Professor of Computer Science at Yale, MacArthur Fellow
- Makiko Tanaka, 1963, Japanese Foreign Minister, 2001–2002
- Rebecca Traister, 1993, Journalist (New York Magazine, Elle)
- Olivia Weaver (née Fiechter, class of 2014), professional squash player ranked in the top 3 globally.
- Kristen Welker, 1994. NBC News journalist
- Santigold (Santi White, class of 1993), musician, singer, songwriter, and producer.
- John Fabian Witt (class of 1990), author, historian, and professor at Yale Law School; finalist for the Pulitzer Prize in History.
- Dan Wolf, 1975, Massachusetts state senator, founder of Cape Air

== Notable staff ==
- Shari Heck, former musician, member of Cyberbully Mom Club.

== Entertainment ==
- The main character from the TV series Twin Peaks, FBI Agent Dale Cooper, supposedly grew up in Germantown and attended Germantown Friends School (as created by director David Lynch, who spent many years in Philadelphia). They were also referenced in The Goldbergs' spinoff show, Schooled, in the fifth episode of the first season, "Money for RENT".
