= Cecil Rhodes (disambiguation) =

Cecil Rhodes (1853–1902) was a British mining magnate and politician.

Cecil Rhodes may also refer to:

- Cecil Rhodes (rugby league) (1901–1966), Australian rugby league player
- Cecil Rhodes (cricketer) (1906–1990), English cricketer

== See also ==
- Cecil E. Rhode (1902–1979), American writer and journalist
