= Rhode aspinifera =

Scientific classification
- Kingdom: Animalia
- Phylum: Arthropoda
- Subphylum: Chelicerata
- Class: Arachnida
- Order: Araneae
- Infraorder: Araneomorphae
- Family: Dysderidae
- Genus: Rhode
- Species: R. aspinifera

Binomial name
- Rhode aspinifera (Nikolic, 1963)

Synonyms
- Typhlorhode aspinifera Nikolic, 1963

Species of spider

Rhode aspinifera is a species of Slovenian woodlouse spider, found primarily within caves.

== Description ==
Mature males have a total length of 3.3–3.4 mm, and females a total length of 3.8–4.6 mm. The carapace and sternum are reddish-brown in colour. A dorsal and a ventral scutum cover almost all of the abdomen. The promargin of the chelicerae has three teeth, and the retromargin has a single denticle. The eyes are completely absent, as their primary habitat is inside caves. The legs are covered in hair, especially on the ventral side of the metatarsi.
