= Rhode Island (disambiguation) =

Rhode Island is a constituent state of the United States.

Rhode Island may also refer to:

- Aquidneck Island, officially named Rhode Island, part of the US state and the source of its name
- Colony of Rhode Island and Providence Plantations, the former British colony which became the US state
- University of Rhode Island
  - Rhode Island Rams, the athletic program of the above university
- Rhode Island (California), an island in the San Joaquin River, United States

== See also ==
- Rhodes, the Greek island
- Rhoda Island, Nile, Cairo, Egypt
- Road Island (album), by Ambrosia
- Rhode (disambiguation)
- Rhodes (disambiguation)
- Rode (disambiguation)
- Road (disambiguation)
