= Rhode (surname) =

Rhode is a surname. Notable people with the surname include:

- Franz Rhode (died 1559), German printer of the 16th century
- Kim Rhode (born 1979), American three-time Olympic shooting champion
- Paul Peter Rhode (1871–1945), German-born American Roman Catholic bishop
- Robin Rhode, (born 1976), South-African artist

== See also ==
- Rhodes (surname)
