= Roads (surname) =

Roads is a surname, and may refer to:

- Barbara Roads (1928–2023), American labor activist
- Curtis Roads (born 1951), American composer, author and programmer
- Elizabeth Roads (born 1951), Scottish herald
- Franc Roads (1852–1924), American artist and feminist
- Michael J. Roads (1937–2024), British-Australian author

== See also ==
- Rhodes (surname)
- Rhoades (surname)
- Rhoads (surname)
