= Hryhorii Skovoroda =

Ukrainian philosopher (1722–1794)

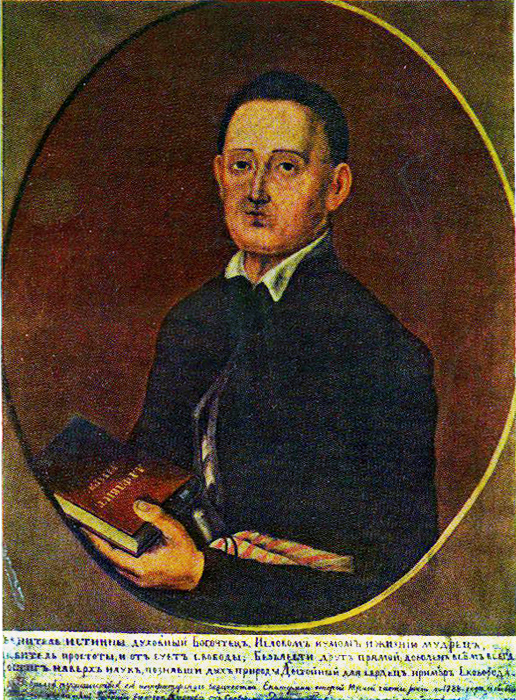
- Born: 3 December 1722; Chernukhi, Lubny Regiment, Cossack Hetmanate, Russian Empire (now Chornukhy, Ukraine)
- Died: 9 November 1794 (age 71); Pan-Ivanovka, Kharkov Governorate, Russian Empire (now Skovorodynivka, Kharkiv Oblast, Ukraine)
- Occupations: Writer; composer; teacher
- Writing career
- Language: Latin, Greek; a mixture of Church Slavonic, Ukrainian, and Russian

Hryhorii Skovoroda, also Gregory Skovoroda or Grigory Skovoroda (Latin: Gregorius Scovoroda; Ukrainian: Григорій Савич Сковорода, Hryhorii Savych Skovoroda; Russian: Григорий Саввич Сковорода, Grigory Savvich Skovoroda; 3 December 1722 – 9 November 1794), was a philosopher of Ukrainian Cossack origin who lived and worked in the Russian Empire. He was a poet, a teacher and a composer of liturgical music. His significant influence on his contemporaries and succeeding generations and his way of life were universally regarded as Socratic, and he was often called a "Socrates".

Skovoroda, whose native tongue was vernacular Ukrainian, wrote his texts in a mixture of three languages: Church Slavonic, Ukrainian, and Russian, with some elements from Latin and Greek and a large number of Western-Europeanisms. Different views exist about how to characterize the base language upon which he developed his highly individual idiom. One scholar has identified this base language as the variety of Russian spoken by the upper classes in Kharkiv and the surrounding Sloboda Ukraine region; this version of Russian contained many Ukrainianisms. According to another view, he wrote some of his works in the Ukrainian variety of Church Slavonic and others in the old Ukrainian literary language. The majority of his surviving letters are written in Latin and Greek.

He received his education at the Academia Mohileana in Kiev (now Kyiv, Ukraine). He led the life of an itinerant thinker-beggar. In his tracts and dialogs, biblical problems overlap with those examined earlier by Plato and the Stoics. Skovoroda's first book was issued after his death in 1798 in Saint Petersburg. Skovoroda's complete works were published for the first time in Saint Petersburg in 1861. Many of his works existed only in manuscript form before this edition.

== Life ==
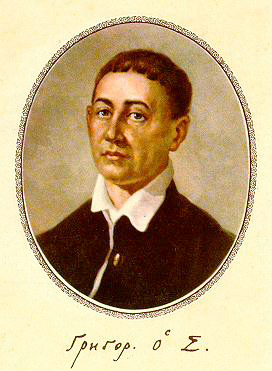
Portrait of Skovoroda with his signature; his first name is written in Cyrillic (in abbreviated form) and his last name is represented by the Greek letter sigma (Σ)

Skovoroda was born into a small-holder Ukrainian Registered Cossack family in the village of Chornukhy in Lubny Regiment, Cossack Hetmante (In 1708 the territory of Cossack Hetmanate was incorporated into the Kiev Governorate, though the Cossack Hetmanate was not liquidated), Russian Empire (modern-day Poltava Oblast, Ukraine), in 1722. His mother, Pelageya Stepanovna Shang-Giray, was directly related to Şahin Giray and was of partial Crimean Tatar ancestry. He was a student at the Kiev-Mohyla Academy (1734–1741, 1744–1745, 1751–1753) but did not graduate.

In 1741, at the age of 19, due to his uncle Ignatiy Poltavtsev he was taken from Kiev to sing in the imperial choir in Moscow and St. Petersburg, returning to Kiev in 1744. He spent the period from 1745 to 1750 in the kingdom of Hungary and is thought to have traveled elsewhere in Europe during this period as well. In 1750 he returned to Kiev. From 1750 to 1751, he taught poetics in Pereiaslav. For most of the period from 1753 to 1759, Skovoroda was a tutor in the family of a landowner in Kovrai. From 1759 to 1769, with interruptions, he taught such subjects as poetry, syntax, Greek, and ethics at the Kharkоv Collegium (also called Kharkiv Collegium). After an attack on his course on ethics in 1769 he decided to abandon teaching.

Skovoroda's travels in Central Europe represent a formative period in his intellectual biography. In late 1745, having completed his philosophical studies at the Kiev-Mohyla Academy, he joined the "Tokaj Commission for the Procurement of Wines for the Imperial Court," headed by Major General Fyodor Vishnevsky (1682 - 1749), a Serb from Transylvania in Russian service since 1715. During his years abroad, Skovoroda visited Pressburg (modern Bratislava), Ofen (Buda), Vienna, and other cities, engaging with local scholars. After Vishnevsky's death in January 1749 and the appointment of his son Gavriil as successor, Skovoroda returned to Ukraine, arriving in Kiev in 10 October 1750.

1750 Bishop Nikodim Skrebnitsky invited Skovoroda to teach poetics at the newly founded Pereiaslav collegium. Within several months, a dispute arose over his pedagogical methods and his refusal to conform to established methodology. Skrebnitsky subsequently dismissed him in 1751. After the scandal Skovoroda resumed his Studies at Kiev-Mohyla Academy enrolling in Theology taught by George (Konissky), but quit the faculty after 2 of 4 years required for graduation.

In the summer of 1753, on the recommendation of Kiev Metropolitan (senior hierarch of the Orthodox Church), he entered the service of the cossack noble Stepan Tomara (1719-1794) as tutor to his elder son Vasily (1746-1819) at the family estate in Kavrai Pereiaslav regiment. He remained in Tomara's household for approximately six years, during which time he began composing poetry, including several pieces for his collection The Garden of Divine Songs. In ealry 1755 he briefly traveled to Moscow and the Trinity-Sergius Lavra, where he declined a teaching position at the Lavra seminary. Skovoroda left Kavrai in the summer of 1759, when Vasily Tamara departed to study abroad in Zamość and then Vienna.

In summer 1759, Skovoroda accepted an invitation from Joasaf Mitkevich, Bishop of Belgorod and Oboian, to teach poetics at the Kharkov Collegium - one of the most advanced Sloboda-Ukrainian educational institutions of that time, distinguished from the Kiev-Mohyla Academy by its emphasis on natural sciences and modern languages. He briefly stepped down in summer 1760 after refusing Mitkevich's attempts to pressure him to take monastic vows. Skovoroda returned to the Collegium in September 1762 to teach Syntax and Greek, largely motivated by his encounter with the young student Mikhail Kovalensky, who would become his closest disciple, first biographer and the scholar behind first publications of Skovoroda's manuscripts in St. Petersburg after his death. A circle of devoted students formed around him, but facing increasing hostility from the newly appointed bishop, Porfiry Kraisky, Skovoroda left the Collegium a second time in July 1764 amid accusations of moral corruption and heresy.

After several years without a formal position, Skovoroda was invited by the governor of Sloboda Ukraine, Yevdokim Shcherbinin, to teach in the Collegium's newly established "Supplementary Classes" for the nobility. He composed the treatise Entrance Door to Christian Morality for this purpose and began teaching catechism in 1768. However, the newly appointed bishop, Samuil Mislavsky - a former classmate of Skovoroda from the Kiev-Mohyla Academy - objected to an unordained scholar, teaching catechism, and critiqued parts of Skovoroda's treatise. Skovoroda resigned April 1769, this time permanently to never again hold another institutional position.

Following his final departure from the Kharkov Collegium, Skovoroda adopted the life of a wandering philosopher. He settled initially at an apiary in the Huzhvynsky forest near Kharkov, where he began composing philosophical fables (later collected as Kharkov Fables, the first fable collection in Ukrainain literature) and philosophical dialogues, including Narcissus and the Symphony Called the Book of Askhan. From 1770, he frequently stayed with Aleksey Soshalsky, a squire land owner in Gusinka, and in 1772 spent several months at the estate of the retired colonel Stepan Teviashov in Ostrogozhsk, where he composed six philosophical dialogues.

Throughout these years, Skovoroda traveled extensively across Sloboda Ukraine, visiting Kharkov, Babai, Balky, Izium, Kupyansk, Akhtyrka, and other towns, forming a circle of admirers among clergy, minor gentry, and educated laypeople. He maintained a lifelong correspondence with Mikhail Kovalensky, who later wrote his foundational biography.

In his final year, Skovoroda walked from Sloboda Ukraine to visit Kovalensky near Oryol, entrusted him with his collected works, and returned to Sloboda Ukraine.

Skovoroda was also known as a composer of liturgical music, as well as a number of songs to his own texts. Of the latter, several have passed into the realm of Ukrainian folk music. Many of his philosophical songs known as Skovorodskie psalmy (Skovorodian psalms) were often encountered in the repertoire of blind traveling folk musicians known as kobzars. He was described as a proficient player on the flute, torban and kobza.

In the final quarter of his life he traveled by foot through Sloboda Ukraine staying with various friends, both rich and poor, preferring not to remain in one place for too long. During this time, he dedicated himself to individual hermit-like monastic life and study.

This last period was the time of his great philosophical works. In this period as well, he continued to write in the area of his greatest earlier achievement: poetry and letters in Church Slavonic language, Greek and Latin. He also translated a number of works from Latin into Russian.

Three days before he died, he went to the house of one of his closest friends and told him he had come to stay permanently. Every day he left the house with a shovel, and it turned out that he spent three days digging his own grave. On the third day, he ate dinner, stood up and said, "my time has come." He went into the next room, lay down, and died. He requested the following epitaph to be placed on his tombstone:

The world tried to capture me, but didn't succeed.

He died on 9 November 1794 in the village called Pan-Ivanovka (today known as Skovorodinovka, Bohodukhiv Raion, Kharkiv Oblast).

== Language ==
Different views exist about the nature of the language in which Skovoroda wrote his works. He spoke his native vernacular Ukrainian in his everyday life; his student and biographer Mikhail Kovalensky writes that Skovoroda "loved his native language and rarely compelled himself to speak in a foreign one." However, except for his works in Latin and Greek, Skovoroda wrote in a mixture of Church Slavonic, Russian, and Ukrainian. He also integrated some elements from Latin, Greek, and other languages, including a significant amount of Western-Europeanisms. Slavic linguist George Shevelov characterizes his language (not counting quotations from the Bible and numerous poetic experimentations) as "R[ussian] as it was then used in Xarkiv and Slobožаnščyna [Sloboda Ukraine] by educated landowners and the upper class in general," a form of Russian which "grew up on the Ukrainian substratum," contained many Ukrainianisms, and differed from the Russian of Moscow and Saint Petersburg. Upon this linguistic core, writes Shevelov, Skovoroda developed a very individual idiom not equivalent to its base colloquial language. In his study of Skovoroda's language published in 1923, linguist Petro Buzuk describes the philosopher's idiom as mainly based on the written Russian of the 18th century, albeit with forms from Ukrainian, Polish and Old Church Slavonic.

Literary scholar Leonid Ushkalov states that Skovoroda's language is a "lingua mixta [mixed language]" which differs greatly from the Russian of 18th-century Ukrainian authors from Kharkiv. He writes that Skovoroda "had reasons to consider his 'language of writing' to be Ukrainian." (On a few occasions, Skovoroda referred to the language of his works as the "common [dialect]," the "local dialect [zdeshneie narechiie]," or "Little Russian [malorossiiskii]"; the term Little Russia then referred to most of the territory of Ukraine.) It contains parallel Ukrainian and Russian words and mixed Russian-Ukrainian word forms. According to Vitaly Peredriyenko, 84% of the word forms in Skovoroda's poetry collection Sad bozhestvennykh pesnei (The Garden of Divine Songs) corresponds to the new Ukrainian literary language in terms of vocabulary and word formation; his philosophical dialogues were found to contain a somewhat lower percentage (for example, 73.6% in his Narkiss). According to philologist Lidiia Hnatiuk, while some modern Ukrainian readers perceive Skovoroda's language as Russian, the overwhelming majority of Skovoroda's philosophical works are written in the Ukrainian variety of Church Slavonic, whereas his poems and fables are in the old Ukrainian literary language; she states, however, that the boundary between these two varieties is "very conditional."

Skovoroda appears to have been aware of the uniqueness of his language and defended it from criticisms. A number of later authors criticized Skovoroda's language. His unusual language was attributed to the influence of his education or the conditions of the time; alternatively, he was accused of "backwardness" and failing to grasp contemporary problems. The Ukrainian writer Ivan Nechuy-Levytsky called Skovoroda's mixed language "strange, variegated, [and] generally dark." Ukrainian poet Taras Shevchenko wrote that Skovoroda "would also have been [a poet for the people] were it not that Latin and later the Russian language diverted him." In 1901, the Russian novelist Grigory Danilevsky wrote that Skovoroda wrote in "a heavy, obscure and strange language... worthy of a seminarian, clumsy and often unclear." In the 1830s, when a group of Romantic authors in Kharkiv was preparing the publication of Skovoroda's works, they considered "translating" his writings into Russian so as not to "frighten away" readers. According to Shevelov, Skovoroda's stylistic choices were deliberate and not the result of a poor education; the "High Baroque" style that he represented did not attempt to replicate the spoken language in literature. His language seemed "dead" to later readers, writes Shevelov, since the Russian of the upper classes in the Sloboda Ukraine region had by then become almost identical to standard Russian and had become more secular.

Skovoroda was fluent in Latin, which was the language of instruction at the Kyiv-Mohyla Academy during his matriculation there. He wrote a number of short poems in Latin, including fables. Per Shevelov, these Latin poems were mainly written "as experiments and/or with a pedagogical purpose." The majority of his surviving letters are written in Latin and Greek. Individual words, phrases, and quotations in Latin, Greek, and sometimes Hebrew or other languages also appear in his Slavic writings. He had a very good knowledge of German and apparently also knew some French.

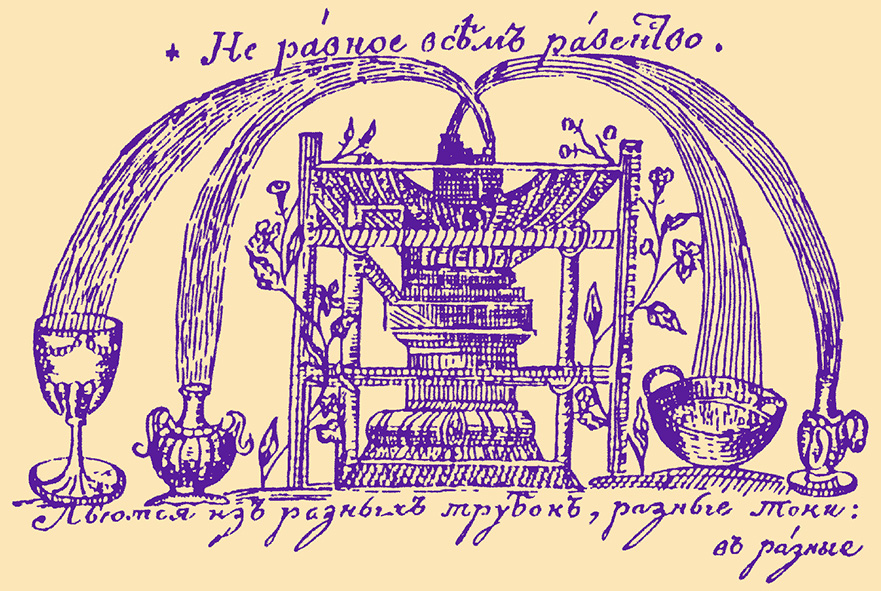
Illustration of Skovorada's concept "Unequal to all equality"

== Works ==
Skovoroda's works were not printed during his lifetime, due to censorship by church officials. Hryhorii Skovoroda was highly educated in multiple languages, in particular Latin, Greek, German. He could read religious literature in German and was influenced by German pietism. Brought up in a spirit of philosophical and religious studies, he became an opponent of church scholasticism and the spiritual dominance of the Orthodox Church. "Our kingdom is within us" he wrote "and to know God, you must know yourself...People should know God, like themselves, enough to see Him in the world...Belief in God does not mean belief in His existence and therefore to submit to Him and live according to His law... Sanctity of life lies in doing good to people."

Skovoroda taught that "all work is blessed by God", and one should seek one's personal 'congenial work' (srodna pratsia). When people abandon their calling and chase wealth or prestige, both they and society become unhappy.

It was only in 1798 that his "Narcissis or Know thyself" was published in the Russian Empire, but without the inclusion of his name. In 1806 the magazine "Zion Vyestnyk" under the editorship of Alexander Labzin printed some more of his works. Then in Moscow in 1837–1839 a few of his works were published under his name, and only in 1861 the first almost complete collection of his works was published. On the occasion of the 100th anniversary of the philosopher's death, in Kharkiv (Kharkov), the publication of the famous seventh volume of the Transactions of the Kharkov Historico-Philological Society (1894), edited by Dmitriy Bagaley (after 1918 also known as Dmytro Bahalii), contained the bulk of Skovoroda's oeuvre. Here 16 of his works were published, nine of which appeared for the first time. Also published here was his biography and some of his poems. A full academic collection of all known works by Skovoroda was published in 2011 by Leonid Ushkalov.

=== List of works ===
- Skovoroda, Hryhorii S. Fables and Aphorisms. Translation, biography, and analysis by Dan B. Chopyk (New York: Peter Lang, 1990) Review: Wolodymyr T. Zyla, Ukrainian Quarterly, 50 (1994): 303–304.
- Skovoroda, Hryhorii (Gregory), Piznay v sobi ludynu. Translated by M. Kashuba with an introduction by Vasyl' Voitovych (L'viv: S$vit, 1995) Selected works (original: Ukrainian language).
- Skovoroda, Hryhorii (Gregory), Tvory: V dvokh tomakh, foreword by O. Myshanych, chief editor Omelian Pritsak (Kiev: Oberehy, 1994) (original: Ukrainian language, translated from other languages).
- Skovoroda, Hryhorii (Gregory), "A Conversation Among Five Travelers Concerning Life's True Happiness" (Translated into English by George L. Kline).
- Skovoroda, Hryhorii (Gregory), "Conversation about the ancient world".
- Skovoroda, Hryhorii (Gregory), Ed. by Leonid Ushkalov. "Григорій Сковорода: повна академічна збірка творів" ("Grigory Skovoroda: a full academic collections of works"), (2011).

== Teaching ==
"Wandering Ukrainian philosopher Grigoriy Skovoroda" by Professor N. Stelletsky (Kharkiv University) in 1894

One of Skovoroda's missions was teaching. Formally he taught poetics in the Pereyaslav Collegium (during 1750–1751) and poetics, syntax, Greek and catechism at Kharkov Collegium (also called Kharkiv Collegium and in Latin: Collegium Charkoviensis or Zacharpolis Collegium) (during 1759–1760, 1761–1764, 1768–1769).

In 1751 he had a dispute with the presiding bishop of the Pereyaslav Collegium, who considered Skovoroda's new ways of teaching as strange and incompatible with the former traditional course of poetics. Young Skovoroda, confident in his mastery of the subject matter and in the precision, clarity and comprehensiveness of his rules of prosody, refused to comply with the bishop's order, asking for arbitration and pointing out to him that "alia res sceptrum, alia plectrum" [the pastor's scepter is one thing, but the flute is another]. The bishop considered Skovoroda's stance as arrogant and consequently he was dismissed.

The first year of teaching at the Kharkov Collegium was successful for Skovoroda. His lectures and pedagogical approach attracted the attention of students, colleagues, and superiors.

Skovoroda was also a private tutor for Vasily Tomara (1740—1813) (during 1753–1754, 1755–1758) and a mentor as well as a lifelong friend of Michael Kovalinsky (or Kovalensky, 1745–1807) (during 1761–1769), his biographer. Probably he was also a private tutor for Gabriel Vishnevsky (1716—1752) (during 1745–1749), son of Fyodor Vishnevsky (1682—1749). Due to Fyodor Vishnevsky, Skovoroda has visited Central Europe, especially Hungary and Austria.

In his teaching Skovoroda aimed at discovering the student's inclinations and abilities and devised talks and readings which would develop them to the fullest. This approach has been described by Skovoroda's biographer Kovalinsky: "Skovoroda began [teaching young] Vasily Tomara by working more on the heart of his young disciple and, watching for his natural inclinations, he tried to help only the nature itself in developing him by engaging, light, and tender direction which the boy could not even notice, for Skovoroda paid particular attention not to overtax the young mind with [heavy] learning. In this way the boy became attached to Skovoroda with love [and trust for] him."

His teaching was not limited to academia nor to private friends and during his later years as a "wanderer" he taught publicly the many who were drawn to him. Archimandrite Gavriil (Vasily Voskresensky, 1795–1868), the first known historian of Russian philosophy, brilliantly described Skovoroda's Socratic qualities in teaching: "Both Socrates and Skovoroda felt from above the calling to be tutors of the people, and, accepting the calling, they became public teachers in the personal and elevated meaning of that word. … Skovoroda, also like Socrates, not being limited by time or place, taught on the crossroads, at markets, by a cemetery, under church porticoes, during holidays, when his sharp word would articulate an intoxicated will - and in the hard days of the harvest, when a rainless sweat poured upon the earth."

Skovoroda taught that one finds his true calling by self-examination. "Know yourself," advises Skovoroda using the maxim of the Greek philosopher Socrates. He introduced the idea that a person engaged in an in-born, natural work is provided with a truly satisfying and happy life.

The education of young people occupied the attention of Skovoroda until his old age. In 1787, seven years before his death, Skovoroda wrote two essays, The Noble Stork (in Original: Благодарный Еродій, Blagorodnyj Erodiy) and The Poor Lark (in Original: Убогій Жаворонокъ, Ubogiy Zhavoronok), devoted to the theme of education where he expounded his ideas.

Skovoroda's broad influence is reflected by the famous writers that appreciated his teachings: Vladimir Solovyov, Leo Tolstoy, Maxim Gorky, Andrei Bely, Taras Shevchenko and Ivan Franko.

== Tributes ==
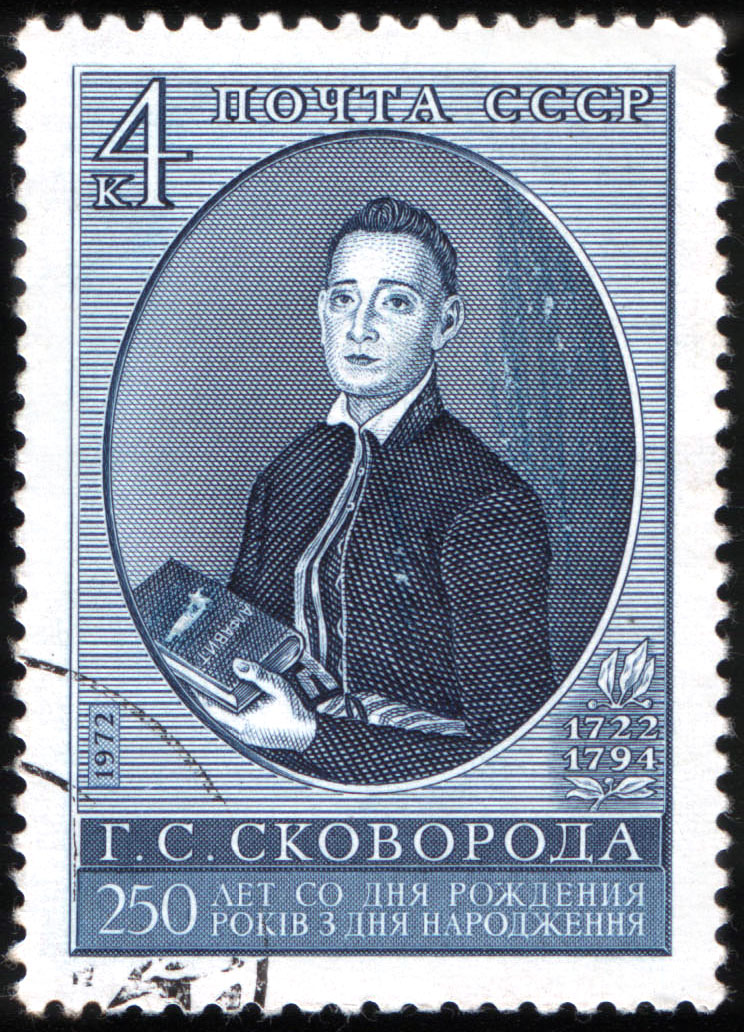
Soviet stamp with portrait of H. Skovoroda (1972)

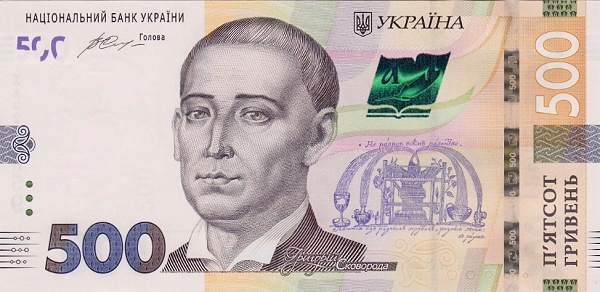
Skovoroda on the ₴500 banknote.

On 15 September 2006, Skovoroda's portrait was placed on the second largest banknote in circulation in Ukraine, the ₴500 note.

The Hryhoriy Skovoroda Institute of Philosophy, founded in 1946, operates under the auspicies of the National Academy of Science of Ukraine (until 1991 Academy of Sciences of the UkrSSR).

In the village of Skovorodynivka in Kharkiv Oblast, Ukraine, the Hryhorii Skovoroda Literary Memorial Museum was located. The museum was operating in a building dated back to the 18th century, on an estate where Skovoroda was buried. On the night of 6–7 May 2022 the building was destroyed with a direct Russian missile strike due to the Russian invasion of Ukraine. The shell flew under the roof of the building, and a fire broke out. The fire engulfed the entire museum premises. As a result Skovoroda National Museum was destroyed together with the historical building. The museum collection was not damaged since it was moved as a precaution in case of a Russian attack. Interestingly the statue of Skovoroda in the building remained standing surrounded by debris of the destroyed building.

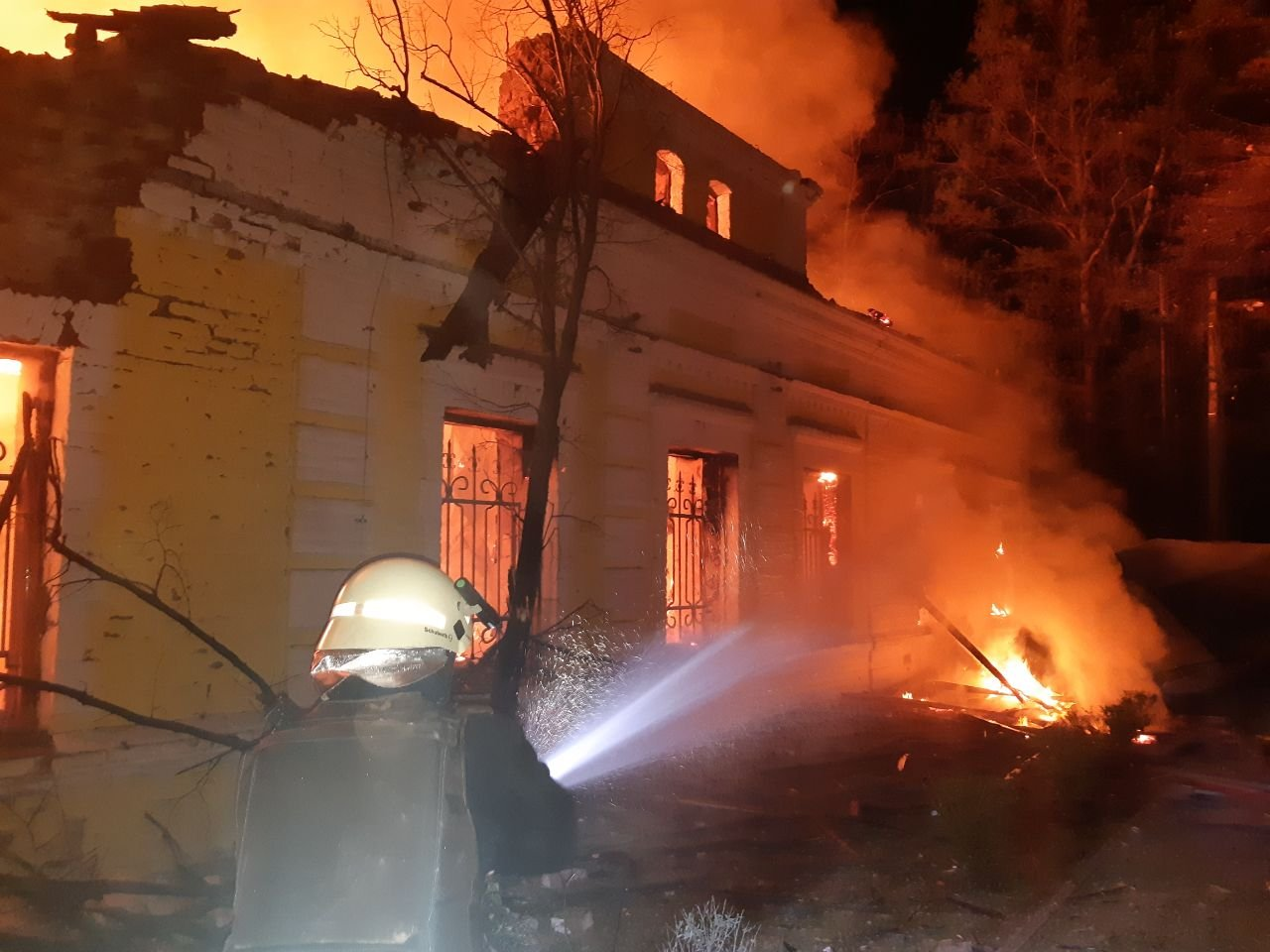

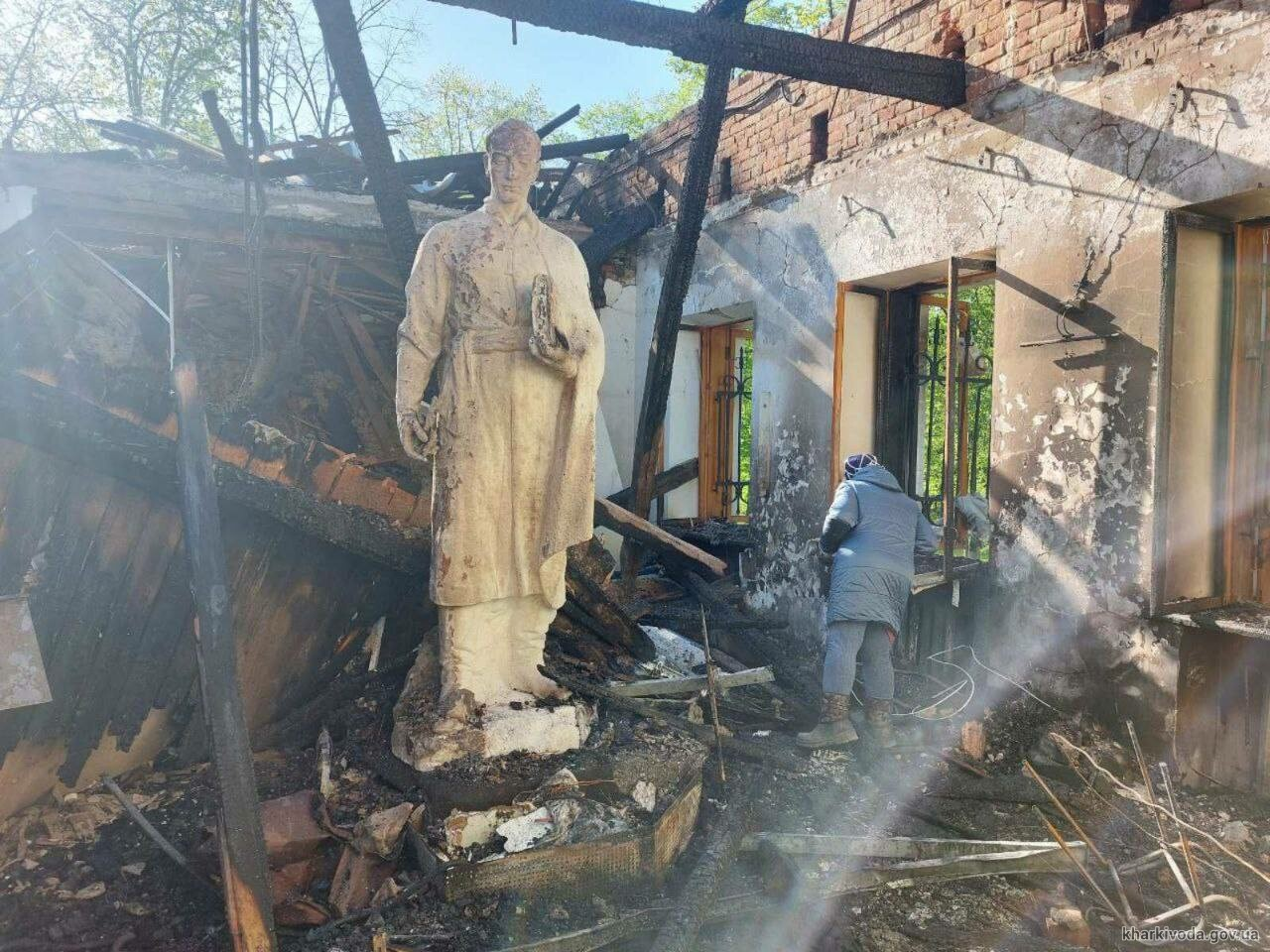

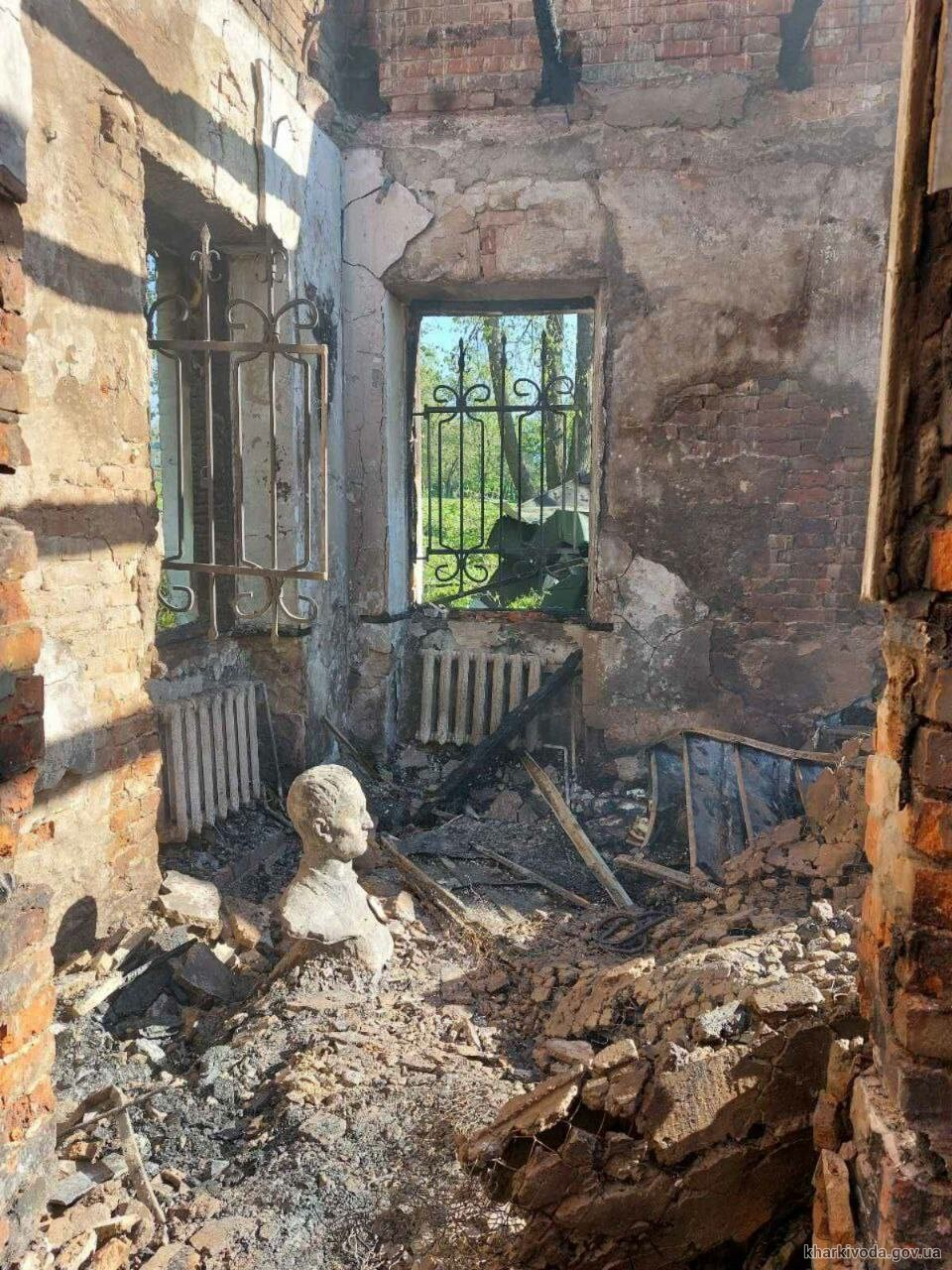

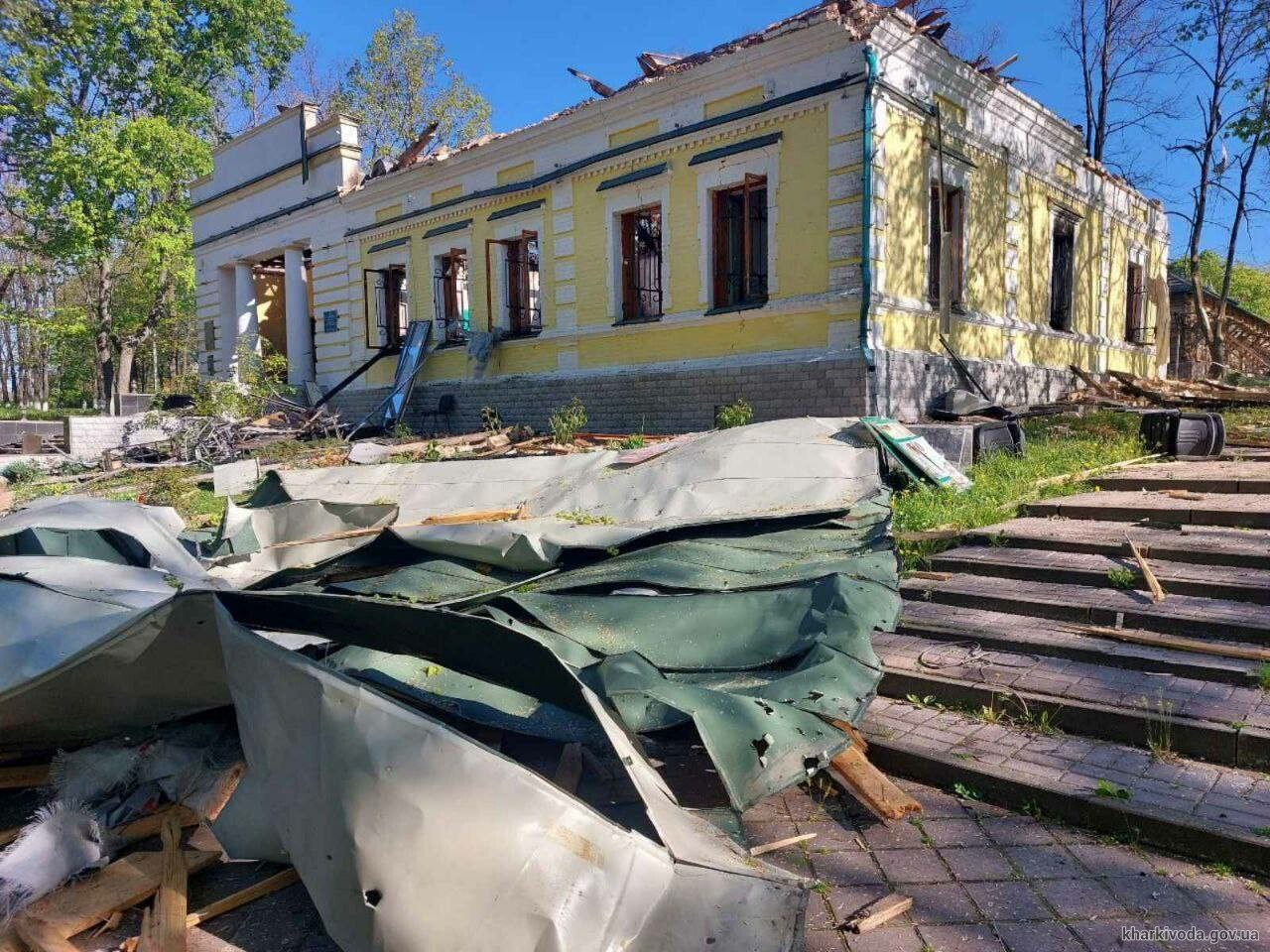

On 2 December 2022, on the 300th anniversary of Skovoroda's birth, a monument to him was installed in Washington, D.C., near the Ukraine House. It was created in 1992 by American sculptor Mark Rhodes who was inspired by Skovoroda's ideas.

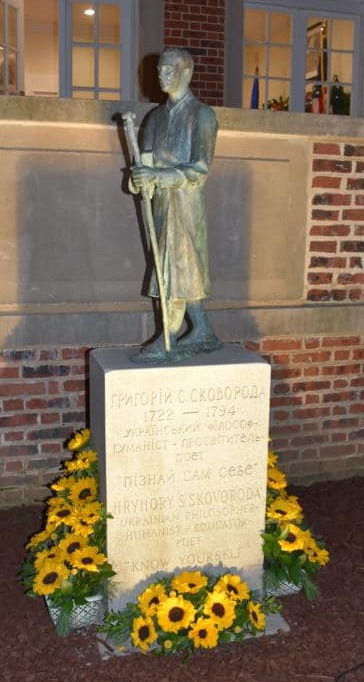
Skovoroda monument in Washington, D.C., outside of the Ukraine House. Sculptor Mark Rhodes

== In popular culture ==
The following pop songs were written on Skovoroda's poems:

- "Ptashko" by Sonyachna Mashyna (2019)
- "Kurs Valüt" by Kurs Valüt (2020)

On 26 January 2024 the Kharkiv City Council renamed Kharkiv's Pushkinska street to Hryhorii Skovoroda street. This was done in response to a 23 January 2024 Russian bombing of Kharkiv that cased 9 victims, including a 4-year-old child. In the evening in particular, the central Pushkinska Street had been hit.

== See also ==
- List of Ukrainian literature translated into English

== Sources ==
- Fuhrmann J.T. The First Russian Philosopher's Search for the Kingdom of God // Essays on Russian Intellectual History / Ed. by L.B. Blair. – Austin: University of Texas Press, 1971. – P. 33–72.
- Schultze B. Grigorij Savvič Skovoroda // Schultze B. Russische Denker: ihre Stellung zu Christus, Kirche und Papstum. – Wien: Thomas-Moraus-Presse im Verlag Herder, 1950. – S. 15–27.}
- Busch W. Grigorij Skovoroda // Busch W. Horaz in Russland. Studien und Materialien. – München: Eidos Verlag, 1964. – S. 66–70.}
- Ueberweg, Friedrich. Die Philosophie des Auslandes. Berlin, 1928. S. 336 ff.}
- Arseniew N. (von) Bilder aus dem russischen Geistesleben. I. Die mystische Philosophie Skovorodas // Kyrios. Vierteljahresschrift für Kirchen- und Geistesgeschichte Osteuropas / Hrsg. von H. Koch. – Königsberg; Berlin: Ost-Europa-Verlag, 1936. – Bd. I. – Hft. 1. – S. 3–28.}
- Jakovenko B. Filosofi russi: saggio di storia della filosofia russa. – Firenze: La Voce, 1925. – XI, 242 р.}
- (in Russian) Сковорода Григорий Саввич // Энциклопедия Кругосвет}
- (in Russian) Сковорода Григорий Саввич // Энциклопедия Кольера. – М.: Открытое общество, 2000.
- Марченко О. В. Сковорода Григорий Саввич // Русская философия. Малый энциклопедический словарь. – М., 1995. – С. 469–474.}
- Zenkovsky V.V. G.S. Skovoroda // Zenkovsky V.V. A History of Russian Philosophy / Transl. by George L. Kline. – New York: Columbia University Press, 1953; London: Routledge and Kegan Paul, 1953. – Vol. 1. – P. 53–69.}
- Goerdt, Wilhelm. Russische Philosophie: Zugänge und Durchblicke. — Freiburg: Verlag Karl Arber, 1984). Также см.: Studies in Soviet Thought 30 (1985) 73.}
- Genyk-Berezovská Z. Skovorodův odkaz (Hryhorij Skovoroda a ruská literatura) // Bulletin ruského jazyka a literatury. – 1993. – S. 111–123.}
- Piovesana G.K. G.S. Skovoroda (1722–1794) primo filosofo ucraino-russo // Orientalia Christiana Periodica. – Roma, 1989. – Vol. LV. – Fasc. 1. – P. 169–196.
- Болдырев А.И. Проблема человека в русской философии XVIII века. – Москва: Издательство Московского университета, 1986. – 120 с.}
- Вышеславцев Б. П. Этика преображённого Эроса / Вступ. ст., сост. и коммент. В. В. Сапова. – М.:Республика, 1994. – 368 с. – (Б-ка этической мысли). ISBN 5-250-02379-7 (С. 155)}
- (in Russian) Лосев А. Ф. Г. С. Сковорода в истории русской культуры // Лосевские чтения. Материалы научно-теоретической конференции ..., Ростов-на-Дону, 2003, с. 3–8.}
- Флоровский Г. В., прот. Пути русского богословия. – Paris: YMCA Press, 1937. – VI, 574 с.}
- Lo Gatto E. L'idea filosofico-religiosa russa da Skovorodà a Solovjòv // Bilychnis: Rivista di studi religiosi. – 1927. – Vol. XXX. – Р. 77–90.}
- Шпет Г. Г. Очерк развития русской философии. – Петроград: Колос, 1922. – Ч. 1. – C. 68–83.}
- Эрн В. Ф. Григорий Саввич Сковорода. Жизнь и учение. – Москва: Путь, 1912. – 343 с.}Эрн В. Ф. Русский Сократ // Северное сияние. 1908. No. 1. С. 59–69.}
- Schmid, Ulrich. Russische Religionsphilosophie des 20. Jh. Freiburg, Basel, Wien: Herder, 2003. S. 9–10, 220, 234.}
- Onasch, Konrad. (in Czech) Grundzüge der russischen Kirchengeschichte at Google Books (Czech) // Göttingen: Hubert & Co, 1967). vol. 3. — S. 110.
