= Parc animalier de Sainte-Croix =

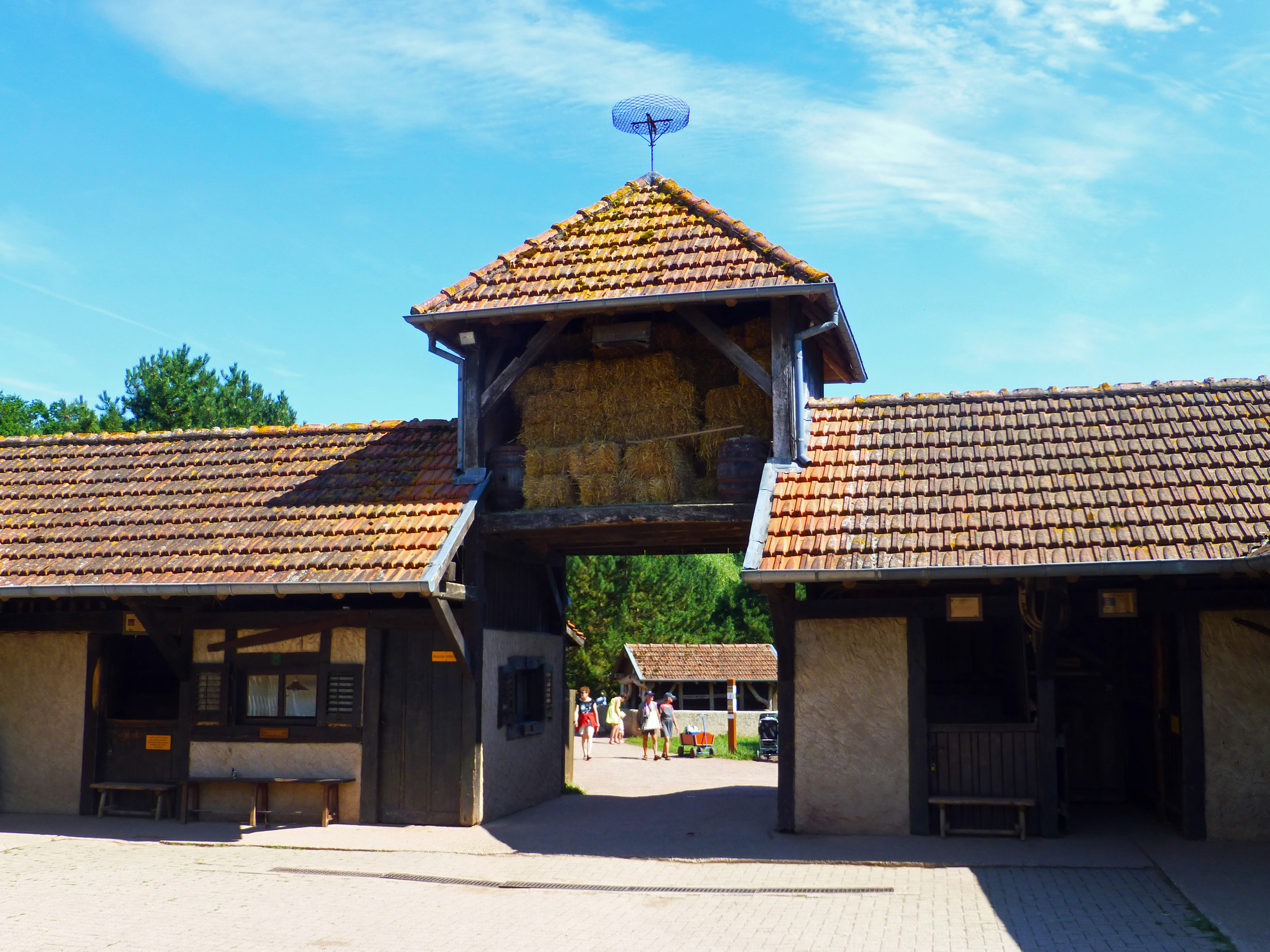
- 48°46′28″N 6°54′00″E
- Date opened: 1980
- Location: Moselle, France
- Land area: 120 hectares (300 acres)
- No. of animals: 1500
- No. of species: 130
- Memberships: EAZA

The Parc animalier de Sainte-Croix is a French zoo specialised in European fauna, located inside the park parc naturel régional de Lorraine in Rhodes.

The zoo was founded 1980 by Gérald Singer.
