= Rhode (spider) =

Scientific classification
- Kingdom: Animalia
- Phylum: Arthropoda
- Subphylum: Chelicerata
- Class: Arachnida
- Order: Araneae
- Infraorder: Araneomorphae
- Family: Dysderidae
- Genus: Rhode; Simon, 1882

Type species
- R. scutiventris Simon, 1882

Species
- 9, see text

Synonyms
- Harpassa Simon, 1882; Typhlorhode Kratochvíl, 1935

Genus of spiders

Rhode is a genus of woodlouse hunting spiders that was first described by Eugène Simon in 1882.

== Species ==
As of May 2019 it contains nine species:

- Rhode aspinifera (Nikolic, 1963) – Slovenia
- Rhode baborensis Beladjal & Bosmans, 1996 – Algeria
- Rhode biscutata Simon, 1893 – Mediterranean
- Rhode magnifica Deeleman-Reinhold, 1978 – Montenegro
- Rhode scutiventris Simon, 1882 (type) – Portugal, Spain, Morocco, Algeria
- Rhode stalitoides Deeleman-Reinhold, 1978 – Bosnia-Hercegovina
- Rhode subterranea (Kratochvíl, 1935) – Bosnia-Hercegovina
- Rhode tenuipes (Simon, 1882) – France (Corsica)
- Rhode testudinea Pesarini, 1984 – Italy
