= William Rhodes =

William Rhodes may refer to:

== Sportsmen ==
- William Rhodes (cricketer, born 1883) (1883–1941), British cricketer
- William Rhodes (cricketer, born 1936) (1936–2005), British cricketer
- William Rhodes (footballer), soccer player
- Billy Rhodes (Welsh rugby league), Welsh rugby league footballer who played in the 1920s for Wales, Pontypridd, and Warrington
- Billy Rhodes (English rugby league), English rugby league footballer who played in the 1910s and 1920s, and coached in the 1920s through to the 1950s
- Trevor Rhodes (footballer, born 1909) (William Trevor Rhodes, 1909–1993), English footballer
- William Rhodes (American football) (1869–1914), American football player and coach
- Will Rhodes (born 1995), English cricketer
- Bill Rhodes (American football back) (1934–2008) , American football halfback

== Businessmen and politicians ==
- William Barnard Rhodes (1807–1878), New Zealand businessman and politician (known as Barnard Rhodes)
- William C. Rhodes (New York politician), New York newspaper editor and politician
- William C. Rhodes (businessman), American businessman, CEO of AutoZone
- William R. Rhodes (born 1935), American businessman with Citigroup and Citibank
- William Rhodes (Canadian politician) (1821–1892), politician in Quebec, Canada
- William Rhodes (Illinois politician) (died 1847)

== Others ==
- William Barnes Rhodes (1772–1826), English dramatist
- William Henry Rhodes (1822–1876), American writer, used the pseudonym "Caxton"
- William Rhodes (sculptor) (born 1966), American sculptor
- William Luther Rhodes (1918–1986), associate justice of the South Carolina Supreme Court
- William Albert Rhodes (1916–2007), American inventor and astronomer
