= The Road (First Night) =

- First Night episode
- Episode no.: Series 1 Episode 2
- Directed by: Christopher Morahan
- Written by: Nigel Kneale
- Original air date: 29 September 1963
- Running time: 55 minutes (missing)

"The Road" is a 1963 British television play by Nigel Kneale. It was broadcast as part of the BBC Television anthology drama series First Night. An Australian remake was aired the following year. No recordings of the production on either video or audio are known to exist. The script for "The Road" was published alongside those for Kneale's teleplays The Year of the Sex Olympics and The Stone Tape under the title The Year of the Sex Olympics and Other TV Plays in 1976.

== Premise ==
It is the late 18th century. A small English village is haunted by ghostly apparitions. Sir Timothy Hassall, accompanied by his friend Gideon Cole, investigate.

== Cast ==
- John Phillips as Gideon Cob
- James Maxwell as Sir Timothy Hassell
- Ann Bell as Lavinia
- Rodney Bewes as Sam Towler
- Meg Ritchie as Tetsy
- Victor Platt as Lukey Chase
- David King as Big Jeff
- Reg Lever as Landlord
- Richard Beale, Beaufoy Milton as Villagers

== Significance ==
"The Road", initially presented as a ghost story, has a science fiction twist ending, making it ultimately a story of science fiction horror. The original 1963 BBC production has been called "one of the great missing masterpieces of British television." Having been wiped by the BBC, it is unknown if a copy of the play exists.

== 1964 Australian Version ==
The Road
- Written by: Nigel Kneale
- Directed by: Patrick Barton
- Country of origin: Australia
- Original language: English

Production
- Running time: 75 mins (missing)
- Production company: ABC

Original release
- Release: 17 June 1964

The play was filmed the following year for Australian TV. As with the original British production, all recordings are thought to have been destroyed after transmission. The episode was broadcast on 17 June 1964 in Melbourne, 26 August 1964 in Sydney, and 14 October 1964 in Brisbane.

Australian TV drama was relatively rare at the time and only occasionally produced science fiction. Other examples of Australian science fiction on TV include The End Begins (1961), Tomorrow's Child (1957) and The Stranger.

Of the play, director Patrick Barton said "the utopian rationalism of Cobb matched against the semi credulous tumbling semi scientific mind of Hassall are an example of two forces alive in the 18th century."

=== Cast ===
- Norman Kaye as Sir Timothy Hassall
- Alexander Archdale as Gideon Cobb
- Martin Magee as Sam Towler
- Ernest Parham as Jethro
- Joy Mitchell as Livinia
- Judith Arthy as Tetsy

=== Reception ===
The Sydney Morning Herald review complained that the story was "too feeble to stand up to scrutiny".

== Radio play adaptation ==
A BBC Radio 4 audio adaptation, written by Toby Hadoke and directed by Charlotte Riches, aired on 27 October 2018. The production starred Mark Gatiss as Gideon Cobb, Adrian Scarborough as Sir Timothy Hassall and Hattie Morahan as Lady Lavinia Hassall.
