= Harold Rhodes =

Harold Rhodes is the name of:

- Harold Rhodes (inventor) (1910–2000), inventor of the Army Air Corps Piano, the Pre-piano and the Rhodes piano
- Harold Rhodes (cricketer) (born 1936), English former cricketer
- Harold Winston Rhodes (1905–1987), New Zealand university professor of English

== See also ==
- Harold Rhode (born 1949), American Middle East specialist
