= Road (disambiguation) =

A road is a route on land between two places that has been improved to allow travel by foot or some form of conveyance.

Road or Roads may also refer to:

== Arts, entertainment and media ==
=== Film ===
- Road movie
- Road (2002 film), a Hindi movie
- Road (2014 film), motorcycle racing documentary
- Road, Movie, a 2009 Indian film

=== Literature ===
- Road (play), by Jim Cartwright, 1986
- Roads (novel), by Seabury Quinn, 1948

=== Music ===
- Road (American band), a 1970s American hard rock band
  - Road (Road album), 1972, their only album
- Road (Hungarian band)
- Road (Alice Cooper album), 2023
- Roads (album), by Chris Mann, 2012
- Road (Fred Frith Trio album), 2021
- "Roads" (Red Army Choir song), a Soviet WWII song
- "Roads" (Lawson song), 2015
- "Road" (TVXQ song), 2018
- "Road", a song by Paul McCartney from the 2013 album New
- "Road", a song by Nick Drake from the 1972 album Pink Moon
- "Roads", a song by Blindside from the 2004 album About a Burning Fire
- "Roads", a song by Ron Hynes from the 1974 Canadian promo album: "CBC Radio Canada Broadcast Recording LM 402"
- "Roads", a song by Portishead from the 1994 album Dummy
- "Roads", a song by various artists for the Roadrunner United project

== People ==
- Mike Road (1918–2013), American actor and voice actor

== Places ==
- Roads, Missouri, U.S.
- Roads, Ohio, U.S.
- The Roads, Miami-Dade County, Florida, U.S.

== Other uses ==
- Road (hieroglyph)
- Road (sports), a "road game" or "away game"
- Reorganization Objective Army Division, or ROAD, a United States Army plan of organisation from the early 1960s
- Roadstead, or roads, a sheltered area outside a harbour where a ship can lie safe at anchor
- Citizens' Movement for Democratic Action, (Polish: Ruch Obywatelski Akcja Demokratyczna), a defunct Polish political party

== See also ==
- Glossary of road transport terms
- Path (disambiguation)
- Route (disambiguation)
- Street (disambiguation)
- The Road (disambiguation)
- Railroad (disambiguation)
- Rhode (disambiguation)
- Rhodes (disambiguation)
- Rhode Island (disambiguation)
