= Cecil Rhodes (cricketer) =

English cricketer

Cecil Rhodes (12 August 1906 – February 1990) was an English cricketer active from 1937 to 1938 who played for Lancashire. He was born in England and died in New York City. He appeared in eight first-class matches as a lefthanded batsman who bowled slow left arm orthodox. He scored 11 runs with a highest score of 6 and held one catch. He took 22 wickets with a best analysis of four for 37.
