= Rodos Colossi RFC =

Greek rugby club

- Full name: Rodos Colossi Rugby Football Club
- Nickname(s): Colossi
- Location: Rhodes, Greece
- Chairman: Anestis Karageorgiou (player-coach)
Team kit

Rodos Colossi RFC is a Greek rugby club in the city of Rhodes on the island of Rhodes (Rodos).
