= Trevor Rhodes =

Trevor Rhodes may refer to:

- Trevor Rhodes (footballer, born 1909) (1909–1993), English footballer
- Trevor Rhodes (footballer, born 1948), English footballer
- Trevor Murdoch (born 1980), American wrestler who used the alias of Trevor Rhodes
