= Rhodes, Moselle =

Rhodes
- Commune
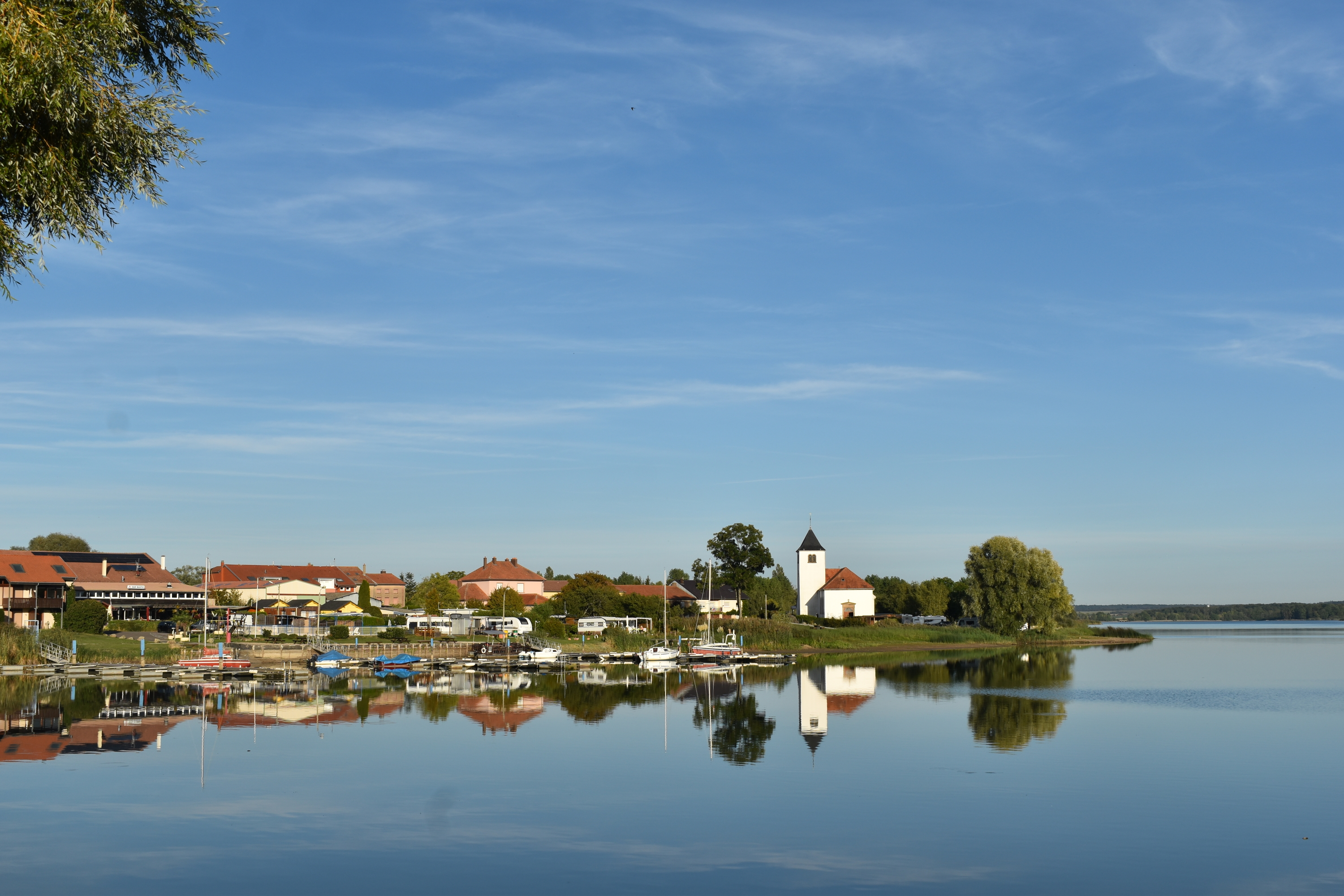
- Rhodes, with the Stock pond in the foreground

- Coat of arms
- Location of Rhodes
- Location within France Location within Grand Est
- Coordinates: 48°45′35″N 6°53′53″E
- Country: France
- Region: Grand Est
- Department: Moselle
- Arrondissement: Sarrebourg-Château-Salins
- Canton: Sarrebourg
- Intercommunality: Sarrebourg - Moselle Sud

Government
  - Mayor (2020–2026): Jean-Luc Rondot
- Area^{1}: 11.39 km^{2} (4.40 sq mi)
- Elevation: 256 m (840 ft)
- Highest elevation: 283 m (928 ft)
- Lowest elevation: 257 m (843 ft)
- Population (2023): 126
  - Density: 11.1/km^{2} (28.7/sq mi)
- Time zone: UTC+01:00 (CET)
  - Summer (DST): UTC+02:00 (CEST)
- INSEE/Postal code: 57579 /57810
- ^{1} French Land Register data, which excludes lakes, ponds, glaciers > 1 km^{2} (0.386 sq mi or 247 acres) and river estuaries.

Rhodes (French pronunciation: [ʁɔd]; German: Rodt) is a small commune in the Moselle department in Grand Est in north-eastern France with approximately 80 inhabitants.

It sits by the side of the Stock pond, with the Sainte-Croix zoo directly to the north, making it a popular touristic destination within the Lorraine Regional Natural Park.

== See also ==
- Communes of the Moselle department
- Parc naturel régional de Lorraine
