= Alan Rhodes =

Alan Rhodes is the name of:

- Alan Rhodes (footballer)
- Alan Rhodes (rugby league)
- Alan Rhodes (rugby league, born in Bradford)
- Alan Rhodes (table tennis)
