= Mark Rhodes (artist) =

American sculptor

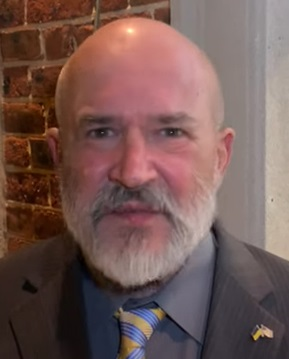
- December 2, 2022
- Born: 1957 (age 68–69); Louisville, Kentucky, U.S.
- Education: University of Richmond
- Known for: Sculptor
- Notable work: Monument to Hryhorii Skovoroda in Washington

Mark Rhodes (born in 1957 in Louisville, Kentucky) is an American artist in ceramics and sculpture. The author of the monument to Hryhorii Skovoroda, opened in Washington near the Embassy of Ukraine in December 2022 for the 300th anniversary of the birth of the legendary Ukrainian philosopher.

== Education ==
- until 1975 Jesse Stuart High School in Louisville, Kentucky
- September 1, 1975 – May 1, 1981 Murray State University, received BFA in ceramics and sculpture in 1981
- 1982 studio assistant to Beverly Pepper
- 1987 Southern Illinois University at Carbondale, received MFA in sculpture in 1987
- studied ceramics in the MFA program at the University of Montana

== Work ==
- 1987–2017 Associate Professor of Sculpture/Ceramics at the University of Richmond

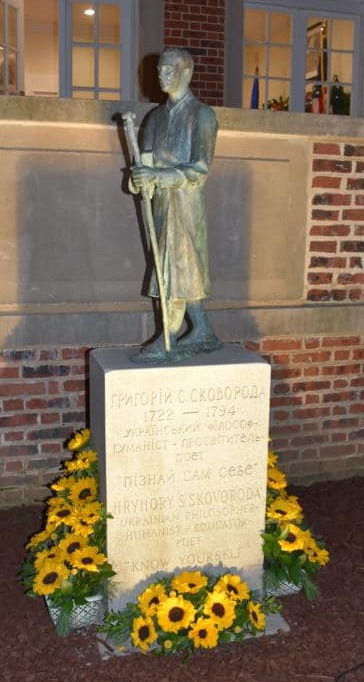
Monument to Skovoroda in Washington

== Sources ==
- Mark Rhodes, Facebook
- Rhodes, Mark 1957–. Overview
- Associate Professor of Sculpture/Ceramics, University of Richmond. May 1987–present
- Sculpture commemorating the 300th birthday of Hryhorii Skovoroda was unveiled in Washington The opening ceremony took place on Friday, December 2, 2022 — Ukrinform reports
- У Вашингтоні відкрили скульптуру до 300-річчя з дня народження Сковороди // ukrinform, 3 December 2022 12:38
- Monument to Skovoroda unveiled in Washington // censor.net, 04.12.22 01:53

== Catalogs ==
- The Challenge, by Mark Rhodes // Morgan O'Driscoll
- Johnson, Charles W., Jr. Mark Rhodes and Ephraim Rubenstein: Sculpture, Painting, and Drawing (exhibition catalogue). Marsh Gallery // University of Richmond Museums, November 29 to December 18, 1988 //
- University of Richmond Museums. Mark Rhodes/Ephraim Rubenstein: Sculpture, Painting, and Drawing, November 29 to December 18, 1988 / Marsh Art Gallery, University of Richmond Museums. Richmond, Virginia: University of Richmond Museums, 1988. Exhibition Brochure. 16 pages.
- Mark Rhodes, Ephraim Rubenstein : sculpture, painting, and drawings : November 29 – December 18, 1988
- Pygmalion and Galatea : poem, sculpture, installation by Mark Rhodes // March 27 to June 28, 1997, Marsh Art Gallery, University of Richmond // Mark Rhodes, The Gallery, 1997 – 48 pages.
