= Galena K. Rhoades =

Clinical psychologist and academic

- Occupations: Clinical psychologist and academic

Academic background
- Education: Bachelor of Arts, Psychology Honors; Master of Arts, Psychology; Doctor of Philosophy, Clinical Psychology
- Alma mater: University of Puget Sound; University of Denver

Galena K. Rhoades is an American clinical psychologist and academic. She is the director of the Institute for Relationship Science and a research professor at the University of Denver.

Rhoades' research interests have centered on the development of romantic relationships and the efficacy of relationship education initiatives. She has received the Lesbian Psychologies Award from the Association for Women in Psychology (AWP).

As of July 2025, according to Scopus, her research work has 6,454 citations.

== Education ==
Rhoades completed her Bachelor of Arts in Psychology from the University of Puget Sound in 2000. Later, she earned her Master of Arts in Psychology and Doctor of Philosophy in Clinical Psychology from the University of Denver in 2002 and 2007, respectively.

== Career ==
Rhoades began her career as an adjunct lecturer at the University of Colorado Denver from 2002 to 2004. At the University of Denver, she held appointments such as research scientist from 2007 to 2013, clinical supervisor and adjunct lecturer from 2007 and 2014, and research associate professor from 2013 to 2018. Since 2018, she has been a research professor, and since 2024, she has also been the director of the Institute for Relationship Science. Along with her academic appointments, since 2008, she has also practiced privately as a licensed clinical psychologist. Additionally, since 2019, she has been working as an executive director at Thriving Families. Since 2020, she has also been a principal evaluator at Washington Park Research and Evaluation.

== Research ==
Together with Stanley, Rhoades investigated how living together before marriage affected subsequent marital outcomes, emphasizing the inertia of cohabitation's role in raising the likelihood of marital discord and divorce.

Rhoades conducted a longitudinal study to assess the influence of parenthood on relationship quality, demonstrating that after the birth of their first child, couples experienced a decline in relationship functioning, whereas couples without children showed a more gradual deterioration. She also examined how marital functioning is affected on the account of post-traumatic stress disorder (PTSD) and deployment status among the Army couples, concluding that husbands' PTSD inclinations are related to decreased positive bonding, increased negative communication, and lower marital satisfaction. She found that women are more likely than men to experience marital discontent, having several relationships prior to marriage has a negative impact on marital satisfaction, and couples who make mindful decisions are happier.

Rhoades explored the association between premarital communication patterns, marital distress, and divorce rate, concluding that negative communication is related to an increased risk of divorce, underscoring the role of early communication in long-term relationships. She also evaluated the development and functions of commitment in romantic relationships, emphasizing the role of commitment in strengthening marriages and maintaining long-term relationships.

Rhoades's evaluation of the relationship education program MotherWise showed that it facilitates maternal health and mental health. Her research demonstrated lower preterm birth, higher infant birth weights, greater use of long-acting contraceptives, and lower postpartum depression for women in MotherWise.

Rhoades co-authored a book titled Fighting For Your Marriage: Positive Steps for Preventing Divorce and Building a Lasting Love. As of 2025, as per Scopus, she has 6,454 work citations.

== Awards and honors ==
- 2004 – Robert L. Weiss Student Poster Award, Association for Behavioral and Cognitive Therapies
- 2014 – Lesbian Psychologies Award, Association for Women in Psychology (AWP)
- 2016 – Distinguished Service Award, APA Society for Couple and Family Psychology
- 2019 – Excellence in Research on Military and Veteran Families Award, Military Family Research Institute

== Bibliography ==
=== Books ===
- Markman, Howard J.; Stanley, Scott M.; Rhoades, Galena K.; Levine, Janice R. (2024). Fighting For Your Marriage: Positive Steps for Preventing Divorce and Building a Lasting Love. Wiley. ISBN 9781394220311.

=== Selected articles ===
- Stanley, Scott M.; Rhoades, Galena K.; Markman, Howard J. (2006). "Sliding versus deciding: Inertia and the premarital cohabitation effect". Family Relations. 55 (4): 499–509. doi:10.1111/j.1741-3729.2006.00418.x.
- Doss, Brian D.; Rhoades, Galena K.; Stanley, Scott M.; Markman, Howard J. (2009). "The effect of the transition to parenthood on relationship quality: An 8-year prospective study". Journal of Personality and Social Psychology. 96 (3): 601–619. doi:10.1037/a0013969. PMC 2702669. PMID 19254107.
- Owen, Jesse J.; Rhoades, Galena K.; Stanley, Scott M.; Fincham, Frank D. (2010). ""Hooking up" among college students: Demographic and psychosocial correlates". Archives of Sexual Behavior. 39 (3): 653–663. doi:10.1007/s10508-008-9414-1. PMID 18839300.
- Allen, Elizabeth S.; Rhoades, Galena K.; Stanley, Scott M.; Markman, Howard J. (2010). "Hitting home: Relationships between recent deployment, posttraumatic stress symptoms, and marital functioning for Army couples". Journal of Family Psychology. 24 (3): 280–288. doi:10.1037/a0019405. PMC 2946188. PMID 20545401.
- Markman, Howard J.; Rhoades, Galena K.; Stanley, Scott M.; Ragan, Erica P.; Whitton, Sarah W. (2010). "The premarital communication roots of marital distress and divorce: The first five years of marriage". Journal of Family Psychology. 24 (3): 289–298. doi:10.1037/a0019481. PMC 4298140. PMID 20545402.
