= Esther Biddle Rhoads =

American educator (1896–1979)

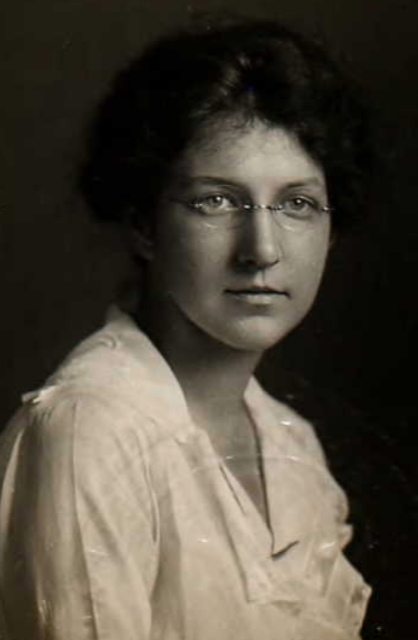
- Esther Biddle Rhoads, from her 1918 passport application
- Born: November 26, 1896; Philadelphia, Pennsylvania
- Died: February 4, 1979 (aged 82); Germantown, Pennsylvania
- Education: Earlham College (BA); Columbia University (MA)
- Occupations: Educator, school executive

Esther Biddle Rhoads (November 26, 1896 – February 4, 1979) was an American educator and Quaker relief worker. She was a teacher at the Friends Girls School in Tokyo from 1917 to 1940, and returned to Japan after World War II to rebuild the school as its principal; she was also tutor of Prince Akihito from 1950 to 1960.

== Early life and education ==
Rhoads was born in Philadelphia, Pennsylvania, the daughter of Edward Garrett Rhoads and Margaret Ely Paxson Rhoads. Her family were Quakers; her father was a physician. She attended Germantown Friends School, Drexel Institute, and in 1921 completed a bachelor's degree at Earlham College in Indiana. In 1927 she earned a master's degree in religious education from Teachers College, Columbia University.

== Career ==
Rhoads went to teach in Japan in 1917, at the Friends Girls School in Tokyo. At the school, she also coached sports, directed student theatrical productions, and oversaw a dormitory. She and her mother were in Tokyo for the Great Kantō Earthquake in 1923. She left Japan in 1940. During the war, she worked in California with the American Friends Service Committee (AFSC) and used her Japanese language and cultural understanding to support Japanese-Americans incarcerated in internment camps.

After the war, Rhoads returned to Japan, as commissioner of Licensed Agencies for Relief in Asia (LARA). In 1949, became principal of the Friends Girls School in Tokyo. She also tutored Crown Prince Akihito, from 1950 to 1960. She left her Japan posts in 1960. In retirement, Rhoads went to Tunisia, to work with the AFSC in to provide humanitarian relief to refugees of the Algerian War.

Rhoads received the Fourth Order of the Sacred Treasure in 1952, from Emperor Hirohito; she received the Third Order of the Sacred Treasure upon her retirement in 1960. She also held the highest decoration given by the Japanese Red Cross Society, and was presented with symbolic keys to the city of Tokyo. A biography, Footprints of a Quaker, was published in Japanese.

== Personal life ==
Rhoads died in 1979, in Germantown, Pennsylvania, at the age of 82. A large collection of her papers is held in the Haverford College Libraries' Quaker & Special Collections.
