= Jay B. Rhodes =

American inventor

- Born: Jay Byron Rhodes; March 2, 1865; Kalamazoo County, Michigan, U.S.
- Died: October 12, 1931 (aged 66); Kalamazoo, Michigan, U.S.
- Occupation: Inventor

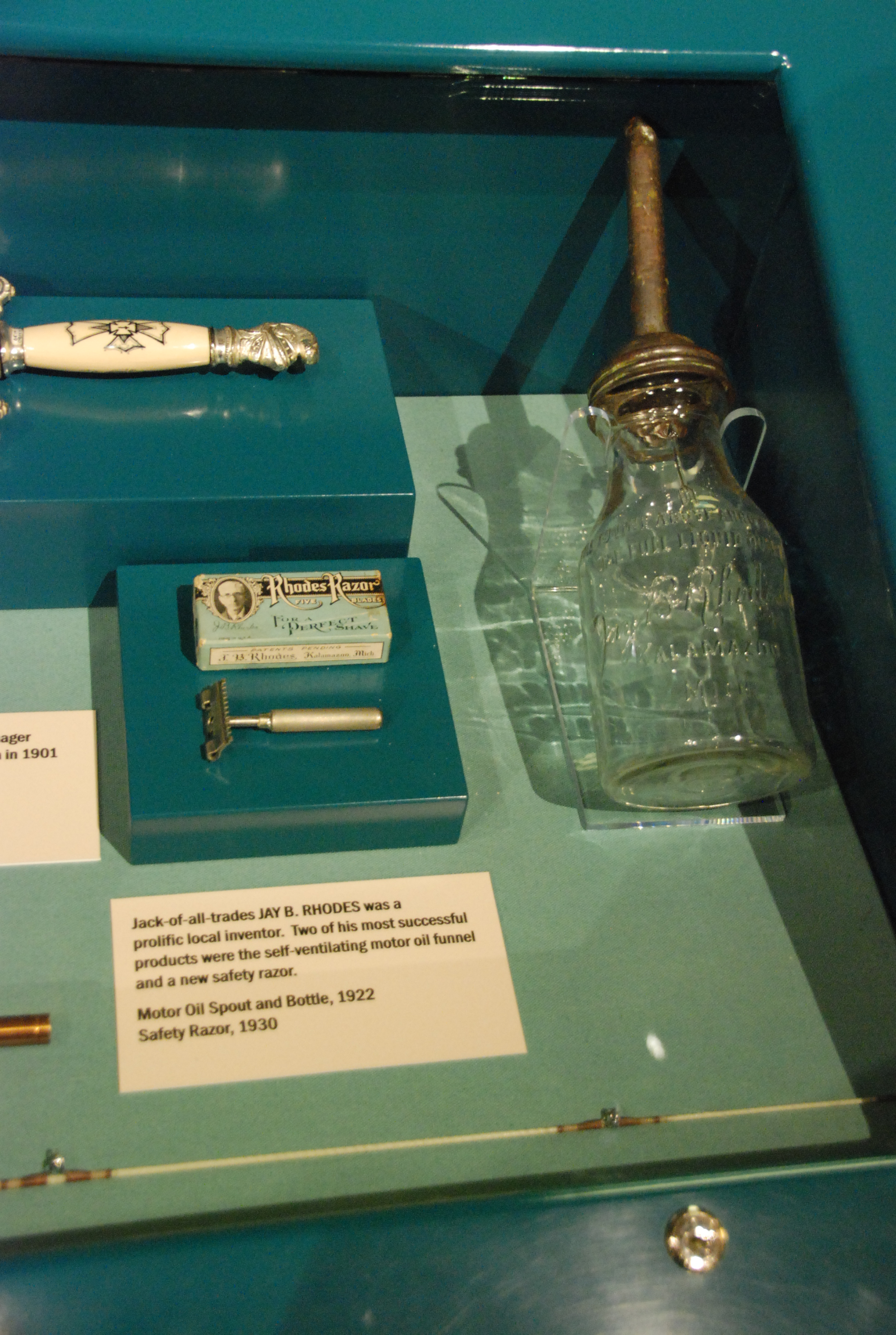
Two most successful products by Jay B. Rhodes: left: Safety Razor (1930) right: Motor Oil Spout and Bottle (1922)

Jay B. Rhodes (March 2, 1865 – October 12, 1931) was an American inventor with more than 230 patents to his credit including the 1922 Vented oil bottle and Rhodes razor.

Rhodes was born on March 2, 1865, in Oshtemo Township, Kalamazoo County, Michigan.

Rhodes died in Kalamazoo, Michigan, on October 12, 1931.
