= James Melvin Rhodes =

American academic (1916–1976)

Mel Rhodes
- Born: James Melvin Rhodes; June 14, 1916; Johnstown, Pennsylvania, US
- Died: April 29, 1976 (aged 59); Highlands, Florida, US
- Education: Arizona State University
- Occupations: Dean of students, Assistant professor for education
- Known for: 4 "P"s of creativity
- Spouse: Rhoda Metz Rhodes
- Scientific career
- Fields: Education; Psychology; Creativity
- Workplaces: Juniata College; Arizona State University

James Melvin Rhodes (June 14, 1916 – April 29, 1976) was an American educational scientist, assistant professor of education and creativity researcher who was the originator of the pioneering concept of the 4 "P"s of creativity.

== Biography ==
Mel Rhodes was born on June 14, 1916, to Waldo and Grace (Davis) Rhodes in Johnstown, Pennsylvania, as the second eldest of 7 siblings.

He grew up in Middle Taylor, Cambria, Pennsylvania where his father was a farmer. After graduating from high school he went on to study at Juniata College, Huntingdon from 1934 till 1938 and earned a B.A. degree in 1938 (major in sociology). During these schooldays he was president of the Juniata College choir and the Juniata College class of 1938. Having finished his studies his interest of contacting people confirmed him to work as a field representative for Juniata in the years 1938–1941.

One of the first to be drafted for World War II he served in the military from 1941 until 1946 as a major in the China-Burma-India Theater (CBI). After World War II, Rhodes initially worked as director in charge of personnel at the Johnstown Tribune Publishing company 1946–1947. Thereafter he accepted a position as dean of students and director of admissions and placement at Juniata College 1947–1952. He also continued his studies and earned an MS degree in education (major in psychology) at the University of Pennsylvania (Penn State) in 1950.

In 1948 he was married to Rhoda Catherine Metz, whom he met at Juniata College.

In 1950 he became an elected member of the honorary educational fraternity Phi Delta Kappa and later also of the American Psychological Association (APA).

He resigned as dean of Juniata College in 1952 because of health reasons and went on to Arizona State University (ASU) in Tempe (AZ). There he continued his studies and earned his PhD in philosophy (minor in psychology) in 1957; his dissertation was signed on May 16, 1956. During his time at the university he was since 1953 also employed at the student's placement bureau and got promoted in 1956 to director in charge of this institution.

At the completion of his doctorate he accepted a position as assistant professor at the College of Education, University of Arizona in Tucson, Arizona, in 1957. He was on faculty of the department of education from 1957 to 1971 and served for several years additionally as senator-at-large. Also he served in different positions for the Arizona Education Association (AEA).

Rhodes died in Highlands (Florida), (Sebring area) on April 29, 1976, at the age of 60.

== Legacy ==
Together with his wife he sponsored the J. Melvin and Rhoda Metz Rhodes Scholarship, which was first granted in 1976. According to Juniata's Development office the scholarship is still being awarded.

== Work ==
Rhodes is noted for his pioneering work in the early study and research of Creativity and is best known as the architect of the framework of the 4 "P"s of creativity and its implication specifically for the field of applied creativity.

While he was working on his doctoral dissertation "The Dynamics of Creativity: An Interpretation of the Literature on Creativity with a Proposed Procedure for Objective Research" he was in search for a universal definition of the term creativity. He did not attain this goal but collected more than 40 definitions, and within these various concepts identified four elementary strands of creativity. This idea was later elaborated in a seminal article "An analysis of creativity" which ever since has been credited as the basis for bringing conceptual clarity and structure into creativity, and was regarded as a viable way to look at creativity and to identify momentous approaches for further research in the field.

=== Research and theory ===
Rhodes theory asserts that creativity is not merely an elusive and fuzzy capacity with no predictable structure, but exhibits a clear-cut composition of four essential components and dominant factors which have an impact to any kind of result, solution or idea. In his epoch-making article Rhodes wrote 1961:

About five years ago I set out to find a definition of the word creativity. I was interested in imagination, originality, and ingenuity. In time I had collected forty definitions of creativity and sixteen of imagination. But as I inspected my collection I observed that the definitions are not mutually exclusive. They overlap and intertwine. When analyzed, as through a prism, the content of the definitions form four strands. Each strand has unique identity academically, but only in unity do the four strands operate functionally.

=== 4 "P"s of creativity ===
Rhodes defined four separate strands which have influence on the occurrence of creativity and which represent the essential cornerstones for any kind of creativity research: Person, Process, Press and Product:

- "The term person, as used here, covers information about personality, intellect, temperament, physique, traits, habits, attitudes, self-concept, value systems, defense mechanisms, and behaviour." (p. 307).
- "The term process applies to motivation, perception, learning, thinking, and communication." (p. 308).
- "The term press refers to the relationship between human beings and their environment." (p. 308). This notion and the word "press" are rather common in the field of education.
- "The term product refers to a thought which has been communicated to other people in the form of words, paint, clay, metal, stone, fabric, or other material. When an idea becomes embodied into tangible form it is called a product." (p. 309).

=== Criticism ===
The concept itself was copied numerous times, sometimes one-to-one, sometimes simply by replacing one term (e.g.: "place" instead of "press"), many a time without crediting the original author. Some followers also tried to add a fifth or sixth term which starts with a "P" (e.g.: "place", "problem", "preference", "phantasy", "persuasion", "passion", "power" or else). On closer inspection it appears that all terms added so far are already included within the original framework, thus are not to be embodied separately in the concept on an equal footing; in details: "Place" is a part of "press", "problem" is as a starting point a vital part of the "process", "preference" and "power" are linked to "persons", and "phantasy", "persuasion", "passion" are traits and capacities of "persons" too.

Hence the original lean concept continues to be used as a framework for studyung creativity, providing what has been descried as "asystem that enables researchers to study smaller manageable components of a complex concept suh as creativity" The framework has been applied by researchers and practitioners to structure creativity research and related activities by grouping its principlal problems and objects of study

=== Significance ===
Today more than 600.000 entries for the keyword "4 "P"s of creativity" listed on Google and many citations in the literature display the importance of this concept to the field of creativity. Further testimonials include major international conferences and research projects which have been organized around the 4 "P"s model.

=== Practical use ===
Adjacent to his significant findings for further research in the field, Rhodes, as a result of his work, also arrived at the conclusion for the field of education, that "a body of thought about the nature of the creative process belongs in the arsenal of every teacher and teacher-to-be."

== Publications ==
- James Melvin Rhodes: The dynamics of creativity: An interpretation of the literature on creativity with a proposed procedure for objective research. (Unpublished doctoral dissertation). Arizona State University, Tempe 1956
- Mel Rhodes: An analysis of creativity. in Phi Delta Kappan 1961, Vol. 42: 305–311
- James Melvin Rhodes: Creativity resides in mental concept. in The Educational Forum, Volume 27, Issue 4, 1963, 477-481
