= James Rhodes (cricketer) =

English cricketer

Personal information
- Full name: James Rhodes
- Born: 27 July 1866; Aston, Warwickshire, England
- Died: 26 August 1939 (aged 73); Solihull, Warwickshire, England
- Batting: Right-handed

Domestic team information
- Years: Team
- 1895: Warwickshire

Career statistics
Competition	First-class
Matches	3
Runs scored	89
Batting average	14.83
100s/50s	–/1
Top score	64
Balls bowled	–
Wickets	–
Bowling average	–
5 wickets in innings	–
10 wickets in match	–
Best bowling	–
Catches/stumpings	2/–
- Source: Cricinfo, 21 April 2014

James Rhodes (27 July 1866 – 26 August 1939) was an English cricketer active in 1890s. Born at Aston, Warwickshire, Rhodes was a right-handed batsman.

Rhodes made his debut in first-class cricket for Warwickshire against Derbyshire at Edgbaston in the 1895 County Championship, with him making two further appearances in what was his only season of first-class cricket. He scored 89 runs in his three first-class matches, top-scoring with 64, made on debut.

He died at Solihull, Warwickshire on 26 August 1939.
