= Justice Rhodes =

Justice Rhodes may refer to:

- Augustus Rhodes (1821–1918), chief justice of the Supreme Court of California
- William Luther Rhodes (1918–1986), associate justice of the South Carolina Supreme Court
