= WMOT =

Public radio station in Murfreesboro, Tennessee

- Murfreesboro, Tennessee; United States
- Broadcast area: Nashville, Tennessee
- Frequency: 89.5 MHz (HD Radio)
- Branding: Roots Radio

Programming
- Format: Americana
- Subchannels: HD2: Jazz

Ownership
- Owner: Middle Tennessee State University
- Sister stations: WMTS-FM

History
- First air date: April 9, 1969; 57 years ago
- Call sign meaning: Middle of Tennessee

Technical information
- Licensing authority: FCC
- Facility ID: 41997
- Class: C1
- ERP: 100,000 watts
- HAAT: 206 meters (676 ft)
- Transmitter coordinates: 36°5′7.20″N 86°26′22″W
- Translator: See § Translators

Links
- Public license information: Public file; LMS
- Webcast: Listen live; HD2: Listen live
- Website: www.wmot.org

WMOT (89.5 FM) is a public radio station serving the metropolitan Nashville, Tennessee area. Licensed to Murfreesboro, Tennessee, it is owned by Middle Tennessee State University, alongside WMTS-FM (88.3 FM). Studios are located at the Scott Borchetta College of Media and Entertainment and at Riverside Revival on the BOE Foundation campus. WMOT's transmitter is located on Underwood Road in Mount Juliet, Tennessee, south of Gladeville. Due to this location, WMOT's signal is strongest in Nashville and surrounding counties. It broadcasts an Americana-based format branded as Roots Radio.

== History ==
WMOT began broadcasting in April 1969 as a noncommercial educational station operated by Middle Tennessee State University (MTSU). It originally broadcast various forms of pop and rock music targeting student listeners. Between 1982 and 2009, WMOT ran a full-time jazz music format targeting a broader audience. By the late 2000s, WMOT was one of only a few U.S. public radio stations employing a jazz format full-time, usually without including other music genres or news. At various times in the station's history, it has broadcast MTSU football and basketball games, when these were not being covered by commercial stations in the immediate Murfreesboro and Nashville areas.

In 1995, the MTSU student government body created another college radio station, WMTS-FM, to serve the campus audience and allow students to program music for their peers.

In 2008, WMOT lost its annual grant from the Corporation for Public Broadcasting (CPB) due to its small staff size, audience, and fundraising campaign. The subsequent loss of revenue, along with budget cuts by the state of Tennessee, prompted MTSU officials to consider discontinuing the station in early 2009. However, in late 2009, the university decided to merge WMOT's operations into a consortium with other MTSU media projects as part of The Center for Innovation in Media. This merged WMOT with WMTS, the MTSU student newspaper, and other media-focused student organizations. In tandem with consequent reductions in the station's subsidy, these changes helped MTSU to avoid shutting down the radio station.

In concert with the reorganization, WMOT discontinued its exclusively jazz format to appeal to a wider audience in the Nashville area. In October 2009, WMOT added news and talk radio programming to the morning and afternoon "drive time" slots (5 to 9 a.m. and 4 to 6 p.m.) from the BBC and Public Radio International. In 2009, the Nashville public radio outlet WPLN-FM discontinued its classical music programming. In February 2011, WMOT replaced jazz with classical music on weekdays. This mirrored WPLN's former broadcasting schedule and was an effort to gain listeners seeking that format. WMOT also brought back National Public Radio's flagship program, All Things Considered (ATC), after many years of absence.

Additional programming changes occurred among Nashville's public broadcasters when Nashville Public Radio acquired the Vanderbilt University student-run station WRVU. It was converted into an all-classical format under the WFCL callsign, while the main WPLN signal became a full-time news and talk radio outlet. In November 2020, WFCL also changed formats (and its callsign to WNXP) to adult album alternative, intended partly to compete against the current WMOT format.

WMOT adopted an Americana-based music format branded as "WMOT Roots Radio" on September 2, 2016, in partnership with the syndicated music program Music City Roots. Ken Paulson, Dean of the Scott Borchetta College of Media and Entertainment, explained that the new format was meant to "truly [reflect] both Nashville's musical past and present," adding that they wanted WMOT's content to "become more tightly integrated with [the] educational opportunities at the college." This ended WMOT's broadcasting of All Things Considered. The previous jazz-focused format moved to WMOT-HD2, simulcasting on 92.3 W222BZ in the rural Bluhmtown region of Smithville, and later also on 104.9 W285FB in Bellevue. Music City Roots ended its programming in 2017 and its involvement with WMOT soon after.

WMOT is a nonprofit, public radio station and the largest Americana radio station in the United States. WMOT promotes Americana music through weekly live showcases called Finally Friday, during AmericanaFest on the AmericanaFest Day Stage presented by WMOT, NPR Music, and World Cafe, and at an annual American Roots music festival called Roots on the Rivers.

In August 2024, WMOT opened a satellite studio in East Nashville on the BOE Foundation campus. The studio serves as a live radio studio, production studio, and video production studio. Additionally, WMOT's popular Wired In in-person concert series occasionally takes place at Riverside Revival on the BOE campus.

Programming currently includes the nationally syndicated shows The List, The String, and Bel-Aire Drive. Webb Wilder, a Nashville-based alternative rock artist, has served as an afternoon disc jockey on WMOT since late 2020.

=== HD Radio ===
WMOT carries two HD Radio sub-channels: WMOT-HD2, which carried "old-time radio" programs until September 2, 2016, when it switched to WMOT's former classical and jazz format, and WMOT-HD3, which simulcasts WMTS-FM.

== Translators ==
Broadcast translators for WMOT HD1-HD2
Call sign	Frequency	City of license	FID	ERP (W)	HAAT	Class	Transmitter coordinates	FCC info	Notes
W222BZ	92.3 FM	Bluhmtown, Tennessee	147653	250	0 m (0 ft)	D	35°51′56.2″N 85°58′29.9″W	LMS	Relays WMOT HD2
W230BX	93.9 FM	Columbia, Tennessee	145252	38	40 m (131 ft)	D	35°37′5.3″N 87°2′32.0″W	LMS	Relays WMOT HD1
W234CD	94.7 FM	Hollywood, Tennessee	145034	10	30 m (98 ft)	D	35°29′16.2″N 87°1′30.0″W	LMS	Relays WMOT HD1
W237DY	95.3 FM	Chestnut Ridge, Tennessee	144990	30	10 m (33 ft)	D	35°21′18.2″N 86°31′26.9″W	LMS	Relays WMOT HD1

== See also ==
- List of Nashville media
