= WMAK =

Simulcast of WOPC, Linden, TN
- Lobelville, Tennessee; United States
- Frequency: 1570 kHz
- Branding: 101.3 WOPC

Programming
- Language: English
- Format: Country

Ownership
- Owner: Will Nunley; (Nunley Media Group, LLC)
- Sister stations: WOPC

History
- First air date: November 16, 1955
- Former call signs: WHLP (1955–1991); WNKX (1991–2013)
- Call sign meaning: Previously used on the former WMAK in Nashville

Technical information
- Licensing authority: FCC
- Facility ID: 27139
- Class: D
- Power: 1,000 watts (day); 66 watts (night)
- Transmitter coordinates: 35°46′1″N 87°49′52″W

Links
- Public license information: Public file; LMS
- Website: 1013wopc.com

WMAK (1570 AM) is an American country radio station licensed to serve Lobelville, Tennessee, with studios in downtown Linden, Tennessee. Currently acting as a full-time simulcast of co-owned WOPC, the station's broadcast license is held by Will Nunley's Nunley Media Group, LLC. The station was established as "WHLP" in November 1955.

== History ==
=== Early years ===
This station began broadcast operations on November 16, 1955, licensed as WHLP.

In April 1981, control of WHLP broadcast license holder Davidson Broadcasting Corporation was transferred from Mildred B. Littleton to E.J. Preston. The Federal Communications Commission (FCC) approved the transfer on June 18, 1981. However, the station soon encountered financial difficulties and the station was placed in receivership. In February 1984, the license was involuntarily transferred from the Davidson Broadcasting Corporation to Larry G. Womack, acting as receiver. The FCC approved the move on February 15, 1984, and it was consummated on March 9, 1984.

A buyer was quickly found and in September 1984, Larry G. Womack filed an application with the FCC to transfer WHLP to Richard Wayne Durham. The Commission approved the sale on October 30, 1984, and formal consummation took place on November 15, 1984. However, WHLP again found itself in financial difficulties and receivership three years later. In August 1988, receiver William A. Potts notified the FCC that the station's license and assets had been involuntarily transferred from Richard Wayne Durham. The FCC approved the transfer on September 9, 1988, and formal consummation occurred on September 26, 1988.

After an aborted attempt to sell the station to Wiggins Broadcasting in 1990, William A. Potts reached a deal to sell WHLP to Hickman County Broadcasting, Inc., in May 1991. The deal gained FCC approval on June 27, 1991, and the transaction was formally consummated on July 10, 1991. At the new owner's request, the station was assigned new call sign "WNKX" by the FCC in August 1991. Branded as "KiX 96", in conjunction with then-sister station WNKX-FM (96.7 FM), the stations were marketed with the slogan "Southwest Middle Tennessee's Country Leader".

=== WNKX era ===
In June 2008, Hickman County Broadcasting, Inc., contracted to sell WNKX to Grace Broadcasting Services, Inc., for an undisclosed sum. The FCC approved the sale on August 15, 2008, and formal consummation of the transaction took place on November 1, 2008. At the time of the sale, Grace Broadcasting Services owned a dozen other Tennessee radio stations in whole or in part, including nearby WFGZ, WMLR, and WVRY.

As the sale was nearing completion in October 2008, an application was filed with the FCC for a construction permit to relocate the station's city of license to Lobelville, Tennessee, to reduce daytime power from 5,000 to 1,000 watts, to reduce nighttime power from 77 to 66 watts, and to move the transmitter site west from 35°45'29"N, 87°27'35"W to 35°46'1"N, 87°49'52"W. After a series of engineering amendments to the original application, the FCC granted the permit on March 3, 2011, with a scheduled expiration of March 3, 2014. The move is calculated to allow Grace Broadcasting Services move WFGZ (94.5 FM) from Lobelville to Bellevue, a suburb of Nashville, Tennessee, while maintaining broadcast service to Lobelville.

When the sale was consummated on November 1, 2008, the station went dark while the new owners awaited FCC approval of this construction permit to allow relocation of the station and its transmitter. The station returned briefly to the air from the old facilities on September 23, 2009, before falling silent again on September 29, 2009. (If any broadcast station is continuously silent for a full year, their license is subject to automatic forfeiture and cancellation by the FCC.)

In October 2009, Grace Broadcasting Services applied to the FCC for special temporary authority to remain silent. They requested the additional time to improve the station's technical facilities and to hire new staff. The Commission granted this authority on February 2, 2010, with a scheduled expiration of August 3, 2010. The station's owners notified the FCC that WNKX resumed normal broadcasting on August 27, 2010. Press reports in March 2011 show the station as silent once again although no silent notification is on file with the FCC.

The station returned to the air in July 2013, retaining the WNKX callsign, but carrying a classic country format dubbed as "Cat Country 1570."

=== WMAK era ===
On September 26, 2013, the station changed its call sign to the current WMAK, and installed a classic hits format. After stunting with Christmas music, WMAK debuted an all-bluegrass music format. Effective May 15, 2017, Grace Broadcasting sold WMAK and WOPC to Nunley Media Group, LLC for $100,000.
