= WXNA-LP =

- Nashville, Tennessee; United States
- Broadcast area: Nashville
- Frequency: 101.5 MHz

Programming
- Format: Freeform

Ownership
- Owner: WRVU Friends and Family

History
- First air date: June 4, 2016

Technical information
- Licensing authority: FCC
- Facility ID: 195506
- Class: L1
- ERP: 100 watts
- HAAT: 30 meters (98 ft)
- Transmitter coordinates: 36°10′37″N 86°46′41″W

Links
- Public license information: LMS
- Webcast: Listen Live
- Website: www.wxnafm.org

WXNA-LP (101.5 FM) is a community-oriented 501(c)(3) low-powered FM radio station that is licensed to and located in Nashville, Tennessee, United States. The freeform-formatted station operates with an effective radiated power of 100 watts. WXNA was voted "Best Radio Station" by the readers of the Nashville Scene in the 2017 "Best of Nashville" issue.

== History ==
After the 2011 sale of the license of WRVU, the college radio station of Vanderbilt University, several disc jockeys who had worked at WRVU organized under the intention to create a new non-profit radio station, which became WXNA. (WRVU became an internet-only radio station after the station's FM signal went off the air in 2011, but returned a short time after, as Nashville Public Radio's classical radio station WFCL, making it a sister station of WPLN-WPLN-FM. That station will become a local music-formatted outlet before the end of 2020, under the call letters WNXP.)

The co-founders of WXNA are Roger Blanton (Delicious Elixir), Ashley Crownover (Set Records to Stun), Randy Fox (Hipbilly Jamboree), Jonathan Grigsby (Set Records to Stun), Heather Lose (Aging Hipster), Laura Powers (Needles + Pins), and Pete Wilson (Nashville Jumps). After several fundraisers and the process of application filing with the Federal Communications Commission, WXNA-LP began operations, broadcasting at 101.5 megahertz, on June 4, 2016.

== Programming ==
The station features a mixture of music, talk shows, and cultural and public affairs programming. Everything broadcast on WXNA is locally produced, with no network or syndicated programming. Several professional musicians who reside in the Nashville area have their own radio shows on WXNA, as do a handful of deejays who previously worked in commercial radio. The station's block-formatting means that WXNA carries shows in a wide range of formats, from jazz to blues to hip-hop, Americana, punk rock and beyond. All programming is listener-supported as it is a 501(c)(3), and WXNA is underwritten by some local businesses.

== Coverage area ==
WXNA-LP's 100 watts of power is just sufficient to cover the entire core of the Nashville area. One can hear the station outside of the Nashville area via the station's online stream on its website, or on the TuneIn mobile app.

== See also ==
- List of community radio stations in the United States
