= Tennessee State Route 438 =

Highway in Tennessee

State Route 438
- TN 438 highlighted in red

Route information
- Maintained by TDOT
- Length: 41.0 mi (66.0 km)

Major junctions
- West end: US 412 / SR 100 near Perryville
- SR 13 in Lobelville
- East end: SR 50 near Centerville

Location
- Country: United States
- State: Tennessee
- Counties: Perry, Hickman

Highway system
- Tennessee State Routes; Interstate; US; State
← SR 437	→ I-440

State Route 438 (SR 438) is a 41.0 miles (66.0 km) long east-west state highway in extreme western Middle Tennessee.

Mousetail Landing State Park is located along SR 438 near its western end.

== Route description ==
SR 438 begins in Perry County at an intersection with US 412/SR 100 (SR 20) just across the Tennessee River from Perryville. It goes north to pass by Mousetail Landing State Park before turning a sharp right to pass through Spring Creek and wind its way east and northeast through wooded and hilly terrain. The highway then passes through Pine View, where it makes another sharp right at an intersection with Toms Creek Road, before passing through nearly mountainous terrain to enter the southern edge of Lobelville and come to an intersection with SR 13. SR 438 turns south, concurrent with SR 13, to parallel the Buffalo River to the community of Beardstown, where SR 438 splits off and crosses the river to leave the Lobelville city limits and continue east. SR 438 then travels up a narrow valley for several miles to cross into Hickman County. It then winds its way through mountains and remote wooded terrain for several more miles before passing through Coble. The highway then winds its way southeast through a mix of farmland and wooded areas before coming to an end at an intersection with SR 50 west of Centerville. The entire route of SR 438 is a two-lane Highway and is located entirely along the Highland Rim.

== Major intersections ==
County	Location	mi	km	Destinations	Notes
Perry		0.0	0.0	US 412 / SR 100 (SR 20) – Parsons, Decaturville, Linden	Western terminus
Perry	Lobelville	20	32	SR 13 north (Main Street) – Downtown, Waverly	Western end of SR 13 concurrency
Perry	Beardstown	21	34	SR 13 south – Linden	Eastern end of SR 13 concurrency
Perry	Beardstown	21	34	John Will Bates Memorial Bridge over the Buffalo River	
Hickman		41.0	66.0	SR 50 to I-40 – Centerville	Eastern terminus
1.000 mi = 1.609 km; 1.000 km = 0.621 mi
