= WAKM =

- Franklin, Tennessee; United States
- Frequency: 950 kHz
- Branding: Radio Close To Home

Programming
- Format: Country music
- Affiliations: Westwood One; Motor Racing Network

Ownership
- Owner: Kensington Digital Media; (D & H Media)
- Sister stations: WHPY-FM, WYGI

History
- First air date: March 1953
- Former call signs: WJTJ (1981–1981); WTJT (1981–1983)

Technical information
- Licensing authority: FCC
- Facility ID: 22365
- Class: D
- Power: 5,000 watts day 75 watts night
- Transmitter coordinates: 35°54′22″N 86°54′21″W

Links
- Public license information: Public file; LMS
- Website: WAKM Website

WAKM is an AM radio station in Franklin, Tennessee, broadcasting on a frequency of 950 kHz.

== History ==
WAKM first signed on in March 1953, broadcasting from its studio facilities located on Mallory Station Road in Franklin. The station would remain at that location until July 28, 2017, when it moved to new studios on Main Street in the following week, on August 2, 2017.

On December 19, 2024, D&H Media, a subsidiary of Kensington Digital Media purchased WAKM for an estimated $100,000.

== Programming ==
WAKM primarily broadcasts a country music format.

WAKM is also noted for its coverage of NASCAR, which comes from both Motor Racing Network & Performance Racing Network.

The station is an affiliate of the Tennessee Titans radio network, carrying football games from the Nashville, Tennessee based NFL Football team, the Tennessee Titans.

WAKM also carries University of Tennessee Volunteers College Football & Men's Basketball games from the Vol Network.

Also since the stations sign on, WAKM has carried the longest running local traders post show titled "Trade Time Live", which airs every weekday at noon.
