= Pine View, Tennessee =

Pine View
- Unincorporated community
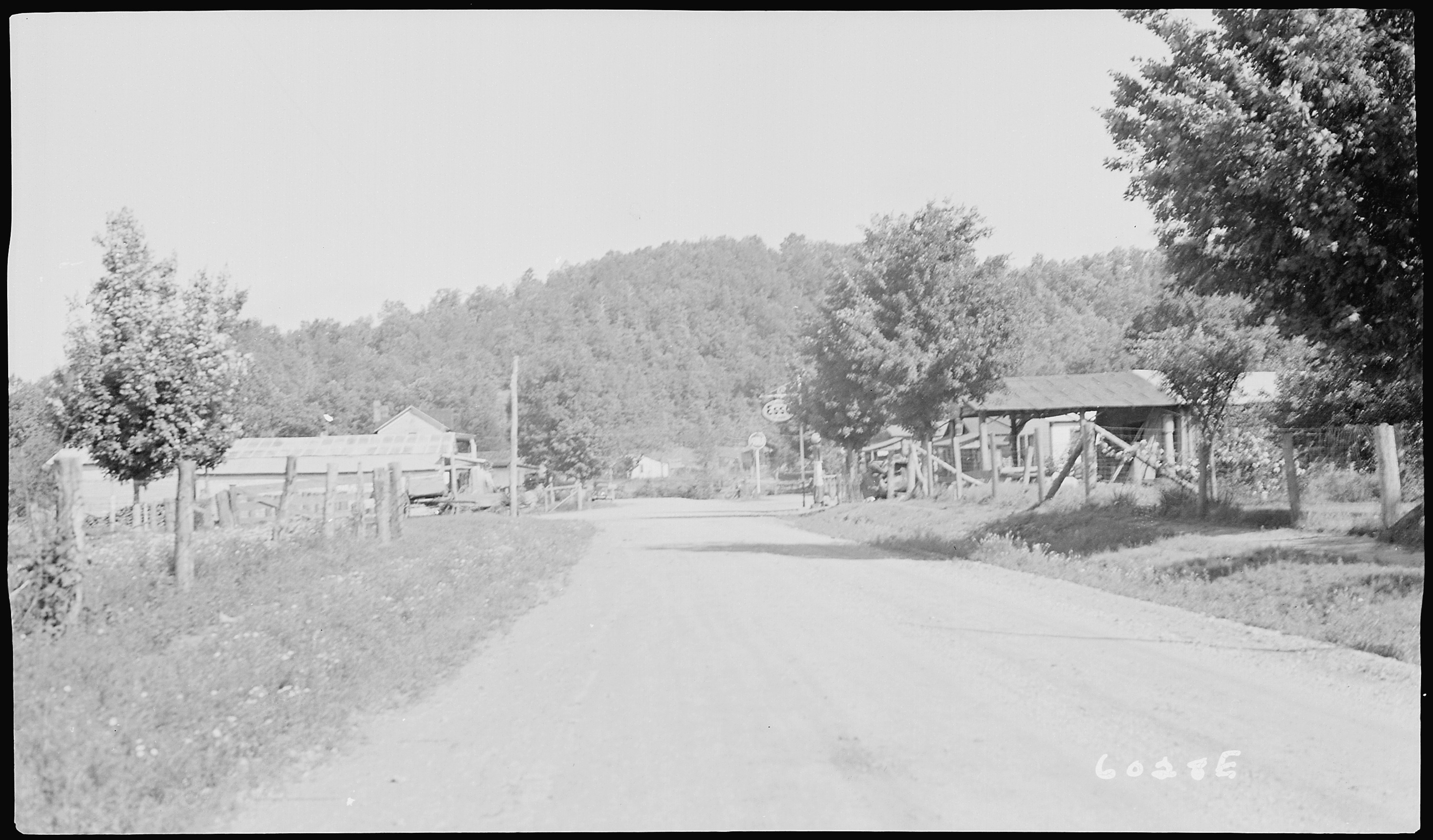
- Pine View in 1940 with an Esso gasoline station

- Location within the state of Tennessee Pine View (the United States)
- Coordinates: 35°43′50″N 87°56′4″W
- Country: United States
- State: Tennessee
- County: Perry
- Elevation: 407 ft (124 m)
- Time zone: UTC-6 (Central (CST))
  - Summer (DST): UTC-5 (CDT)
- GNIS feature ID: 1297591

Pine View (also Pineview) is an unincorporated community in Perry County, Tennessee, United States. Its elevation is 407 feet (124 m). It lies along State Route 438, approximately halfway between Mousetail Landing State Park and Lobelville. Pine View hosts a volunteer fire department.

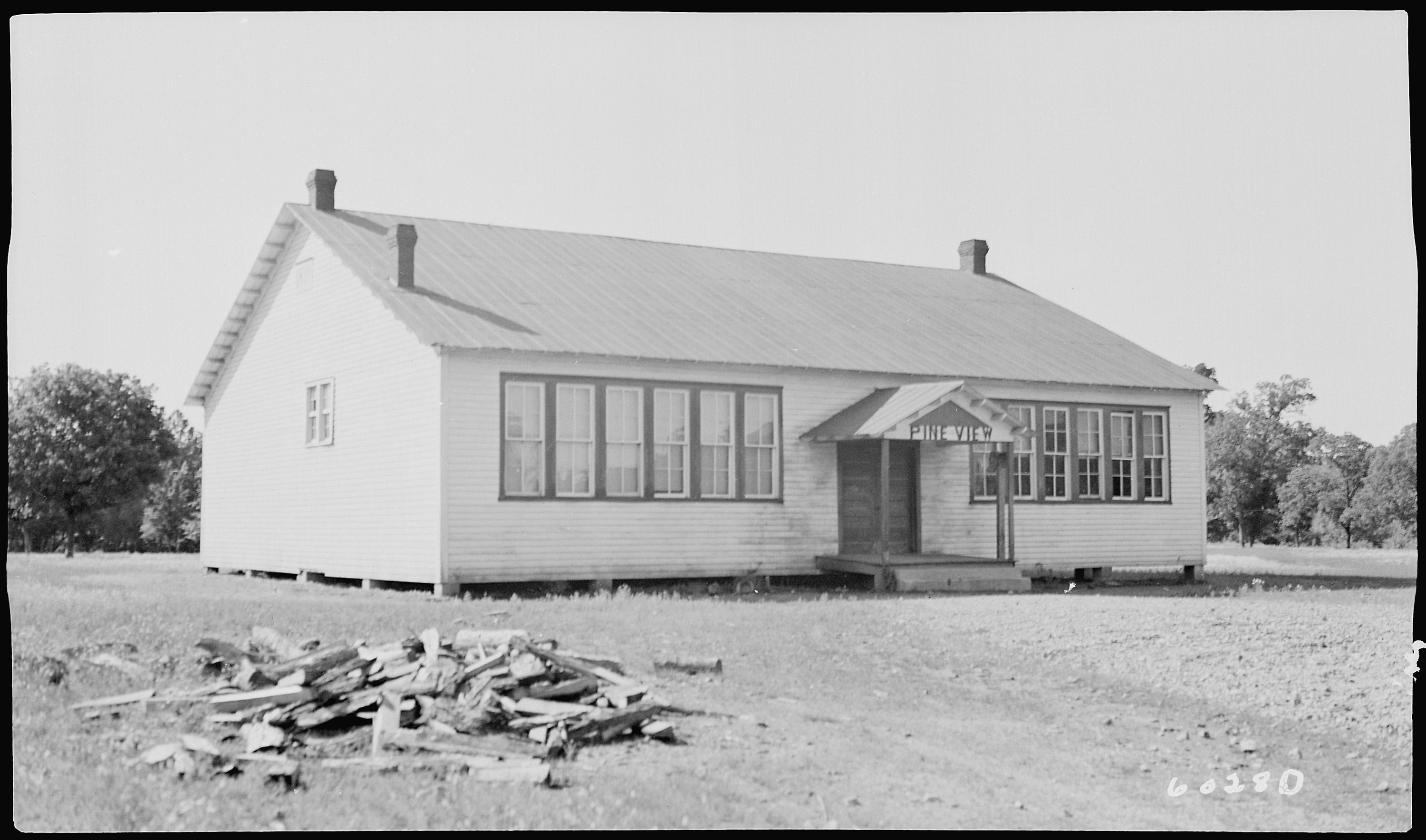
Pine View school in 1940
