= WPLN =

WPLN may refer to:

- WPLN-FM, a radio station (90.3 FM) licensed to serve Nashville, Tennessee, United States
- WYGI, a radio station (1430 AM) licensed to serve Madison, Tennessee, which held the call sign WPLN from 2002 to 2023
