= WMLR =

- Hohenwald, Tennessee; United States
- Frequency: 1230 kHz
- Branding: Fun 99.5

Programming
- Format: Oldies
- Affiliations: Citadel Media

Ownership
- Owner: Grace Broadcasting Services, Inc.
- Sister stations: WHPY-FM, WMAK

History
- First air date: July 4, 1970

Technical information
- Licensing authority: FCC
- Facility ID: 37180
- Class: C
- Power: 1,000 watts unlimited
- Transmitter coordinates: 35°31′22.00″N 87°32′40.00″W
- Translator: 99.5 W258DS (Hohenwald)

Links
- Public license information: Public file; LMS
- Website: 1230wmlr.com

WMLR (1230 AM) is a radio station broadcasting an oldies format. Licensed to Hohenwald, Tennessee, United States, the station is currently owned by Grace Broadcasting Services, Inc. and features programming from Citadel Media.
