= WFGZ =

WFGZ may refer to:

- WFGZ-LD, a low-power television station (channel 22) licensed to serve Lake City, Florida, United States
- WHPY-FM, a radio station (94.5 FM) licensed to serve Bellevue, Tennessee, United States, which held the call sign WFGZ from 1994 to 2012
