= Helen Craig Smith =

American author, genealogist, and educator (1835–1910)

- Born: Helen Craig; May 20, 1927; Perryville, Tennessee
- Died: February 18, 2020 (aged 92); Linden, Tennessee
- Education: Austin Peay State University
- Occupations: Teacher and author
- Relatives: McDonald Craig (brother)

Helen Craig Smith (May 20, 1927 - February 18, 2020) was an American teacher, genealogist, and author. Smith completed her high school education in Nashville, living with relatives to attend school in the city since no high school was available for black students in her home town of Linden, Tennessee. In 1964, Smith became the first Black woman to receive a bachelor's degree from Austin Peay State University, later also earning a master's degree from the same school. Smith began teaching in the segregated school system of Perry County, Tennessee, later teaching in Fort Campbell, Kentucky schools. In 1965 she became one of the first teachers in the then newly integrated Nashville public schools. She then returned to teaching in Linden, Tennessee, near where her ancestors established the first Black-owned farm in Perry County in 1889, retiring there. Smith authored two books. Her first book, For Ever The Twain Shall Meet (1997), was a semi-autobiographical historical fiction novel that was featured in the 1998 Southern Festival of Books. Her second book was Numbers: An Abridged Enumeration of the Peoples of Color of Perry County, Tennessee, 1865-2000 (2001), a genealogical history of Black families in Perry County. Smith was the sister of musician McDonald Craig.

== Works ==
- For Ever The Twain Shall Meet (1997)
- Numbers: An Abridged Enumeration of the Peoples of Color of Perry County, Tennessee, 1865-2000 (2001)
