= Helen Craig =

Helen Craig may refer to:

- Helen Craig (writer), English children's book illustrator and writer
- Helen Craig (actress), American actress

== See also ==
- Helen Craig McCullough, American academic, translator and Japanologist
- Helen Craig Smith, American teacher, genealogist, and author
