= Spring Creek, Perry County, Tennessee =

Spring Creek, Tennessee
- Unincorporated community
- Location within Tennessee Location within the United States
- Coordinates: 35°39′15″N 87°59′24″W
- Country: United States
- State: Tennessee
- County: Perry
- Elevation: 410 ft (120 m)
- Time zone: UTC-6 (Central (CST))
  - Summer (DST): UTC-5 (CDT)
- Area code: 931
- GNIS feature ID: 1271064

Spring Creek is an unincorporated community in Perry County, Tennessee, United States. Spring Creek is located on Tennessee State Route 438 7.7 miles (12.4 km) east of Parsons. It is just east of Mousetail Landing State Park.
