= Clarence Kelley Colley =

American architect

- Born: February 21, 1869; Wilson County, Tennessee, U.S.
- Died: July 8, 1956; Nashville, Tennessee, U.S.
- Occupation: Architect
- Spouse: Nannie Sue Molloy
- Children: 1 son
- Parent(s): Seth Colley; Fidelia Elizabeth Smith

Clarence Kelley Colley (1869–1956) was an American architect. He designed many buildings in Tennessee, some of which are on the campuses of Middle Tennessee State University and Austin Peay State University. Other buildings are listed on the National Register of Historic Places.

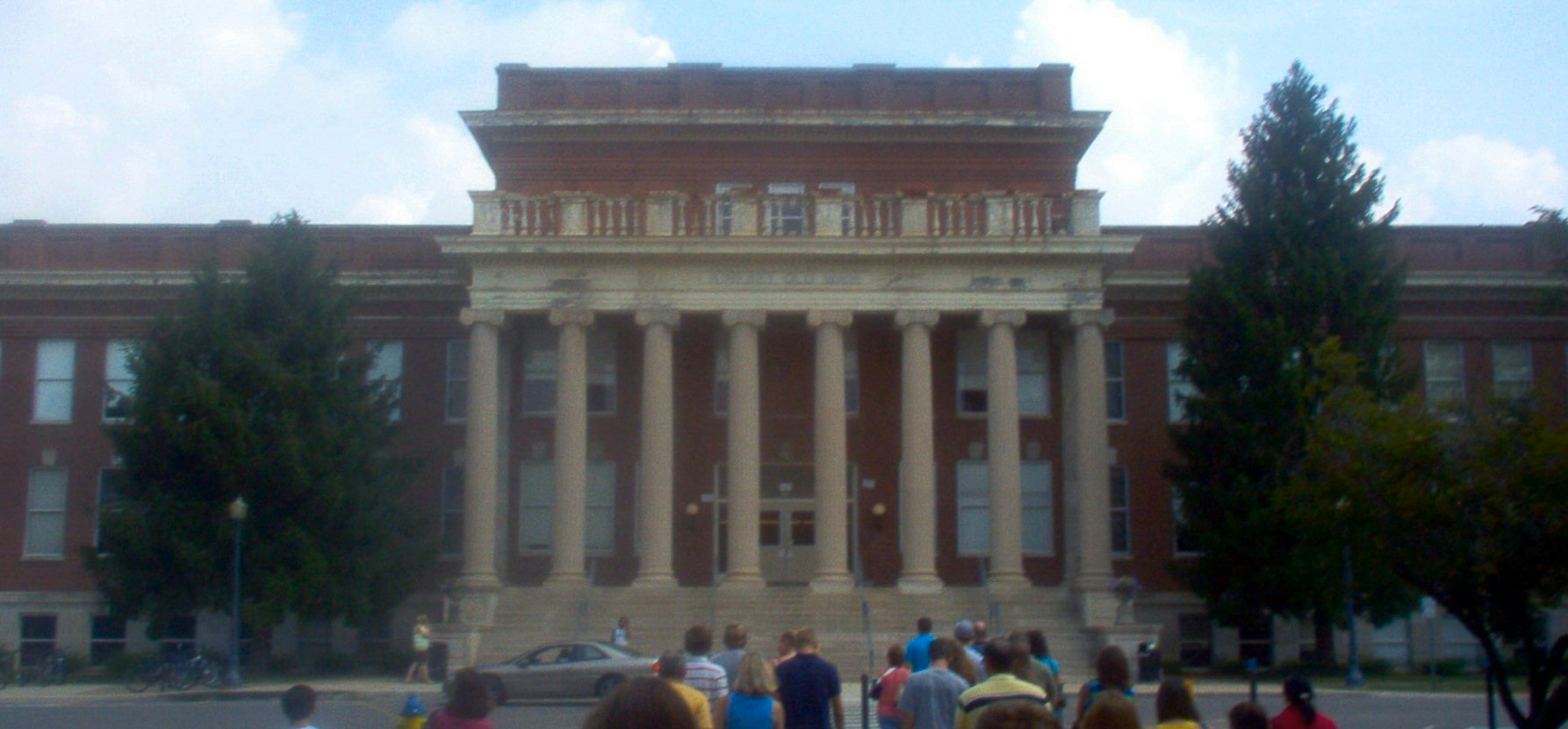
Kirksey Hall, designed by Colley.

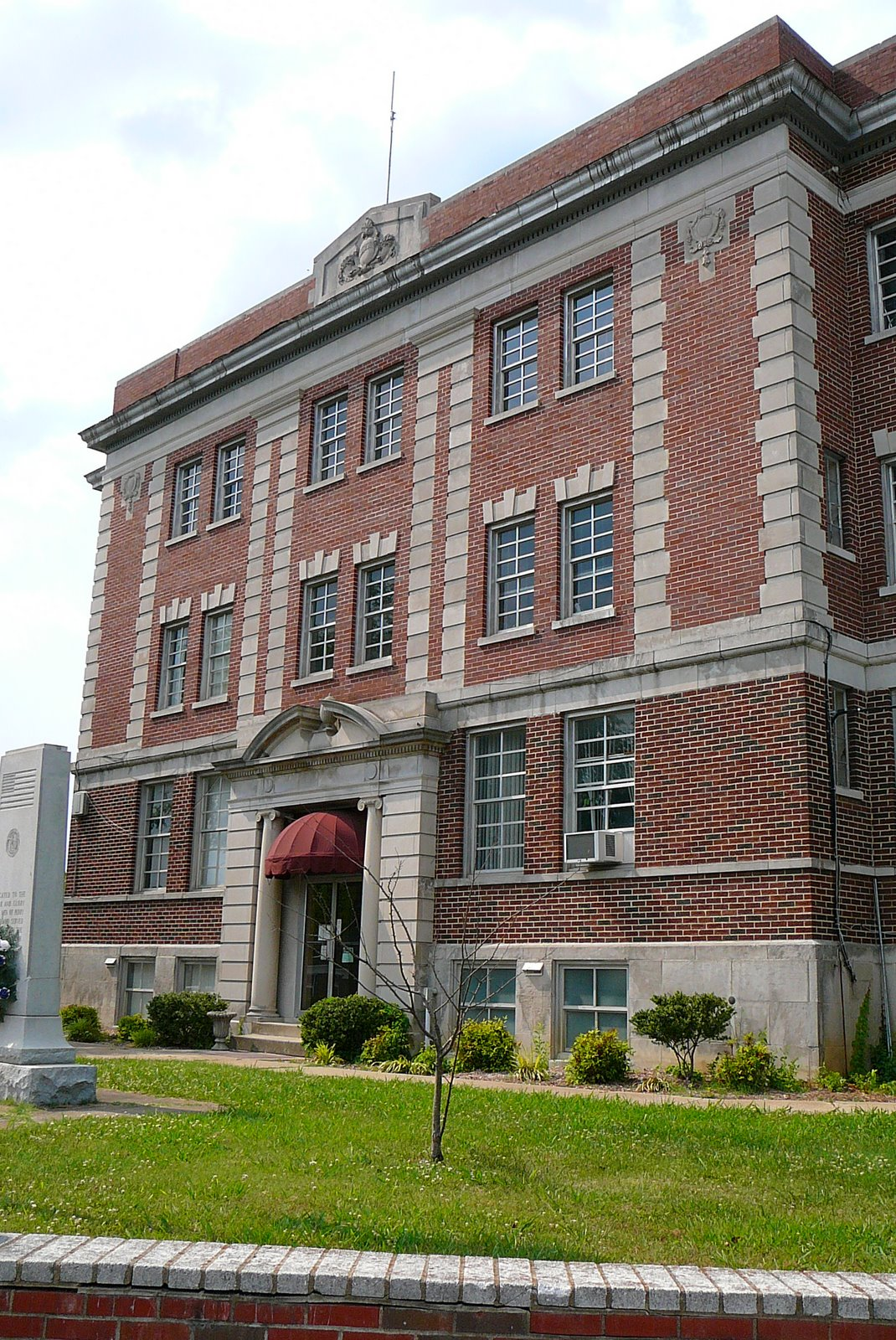
The Perry County Courthouse, designed by Colley.

== Early life ==
Clarence Kelley Colley was born on February 21, 1869, in Wilson County, Tennessee. His father was Seth Colley and his mother, Fidelia Elizabeth Smith. He had a brother, Homer.

Colley grew up on a farm, until he moved to Nashville to work in the boiler room at Vanderbilt University as a young man.

== Career ==
Colley was an apprentice to architects Albert F. Speight and William Crawford Smith. He established C. K. Colley & Company Architects, an architectural firm in Nashville, in 1899. His son replaced his brother in 1921, when the firm was renamed C. K. Colley & Son.

Colley designed two buildings on the campus of Middle Tennessee State University in 1911: the President's House and Kirksey Hall. Additionally, he designed the Commons Building on the campus of Austin Peay State University in 1916.

Meanwhile, Colley designed the North Branch Carnegie Library in Nashville in 1915. He designed the Perry County Courthouse in Linden, Tennessee. He also designed the Wilkinson House in Joelton, Tennessee.

Colley was a charter member of the Nashville chapter of the American Institute of Architects in 1922.

== Personal life ==
Colley married Nannie Sue Molloy in 1894. They had a son, William Clarence Colley. Colley was widowed when his wife died in 1899.

== Death and legacy ==
Colley died on July 8, 1956, in Nashville, Tennessee. Several of the buildings he designed, like the Perry County Courthouse and the Wilkinson House, are listed on the National Register of Historic Places.
