= Richard L. Bean Juvenile Detention Center =

Coordinates: 35.9560°N 83.9611°W

The Richard L. Bean Juvenile Detention Center is a juvenile detention center in Knoxville, Tennessee for children ages 12 to 17.

== History ==
In 1972, Richard L. Bean became superintendent of the facility.

In 2023, the center was the subject of a ProPublica and WPLN/Nashville Public Radio investigation that found youth were illegally kept in solitary confinement.

On May 30, 2024, Bean announced his resignation as superintendent effective August 30, 2025. The day prior, the mayor of Knox County said he had lost confidence in Bean's leadership.

In June 2025, the center was featured in a Last Week Tonight with John Oliver investigation on the juvenile justice system, with Oliver citing Bean's usage of solitary confinement and other treatment of juveniles as cause for reforming juvenile detention.
