= McDonald Craig =

American folk musician and farmer

- Born: April 11, 1931; Linden, Tennessee
- Died: September 26, 2021 (aged 90) Linden, Tennessee
- Genres: Folk Music and Yodeling
- Years active: 1940s–2010s
- Relatives: Helen Craig Smith (sister)
- Military service
- Allegiance: United States
- Branch: United States Army
- Service years: 1950–1953
- Rank: Corporal
- Unit: 3rd Infantry Division
- Awards: Bronze Star Medal

McDonald 'Mack' Craig (April 11, 1931 – September 26, 2021) was an American Country musician and farmer. A member of the Mid-American Country Music Hall of Fame, Craig's style was influenced by and has been compared in style to country music singer Jimmie Rodgers. Influenced by his family's musical tradition Craig committed much of Rodgers's work to memory, and his performances bridged country and popular styles.

In the early-1970s, Craig recorded four singles with Nashville-based Gold Standard Records. He did not release any professional recordings or albums until 2002, when McDonald Craig Sings Traditional Country Music was released on Roughshod Records. In addition to these recordings, Craig toured folk music festivals and appeared on broadcast radio, including Ernest Tubb's Midnite Jamboree. In 1978, Craig won the talent competition at the Jimmie Rodgers Music Festival held in Meridian, Mississippi, the same music festival that a young Elvis Presley had lost 25 years before, becoming the first and only African American artist to do so. Organizers were reluctant to present him with the reward due to his race, but at the insistence of the judges it was eventually given to him.

Craig served in the United States Army during the Korean War, receiving a Bronze Star medal in 1953 for his leadership of a recoilless rifle platoon. After his military service, Craig settled down with his wife Rosetta and took over operation of the family farm, which was later listed on the National Register of Historic Places in recognition of its significance in the history of Black farmers in Tennessee. In 1954, in response to the county's decision to bus Black students to a neighboring county to attend high school, Craig purchased a school bus and accepted the job to drive students the 35 miles to school each way.
