= Lobelville, Tennessee =

- City
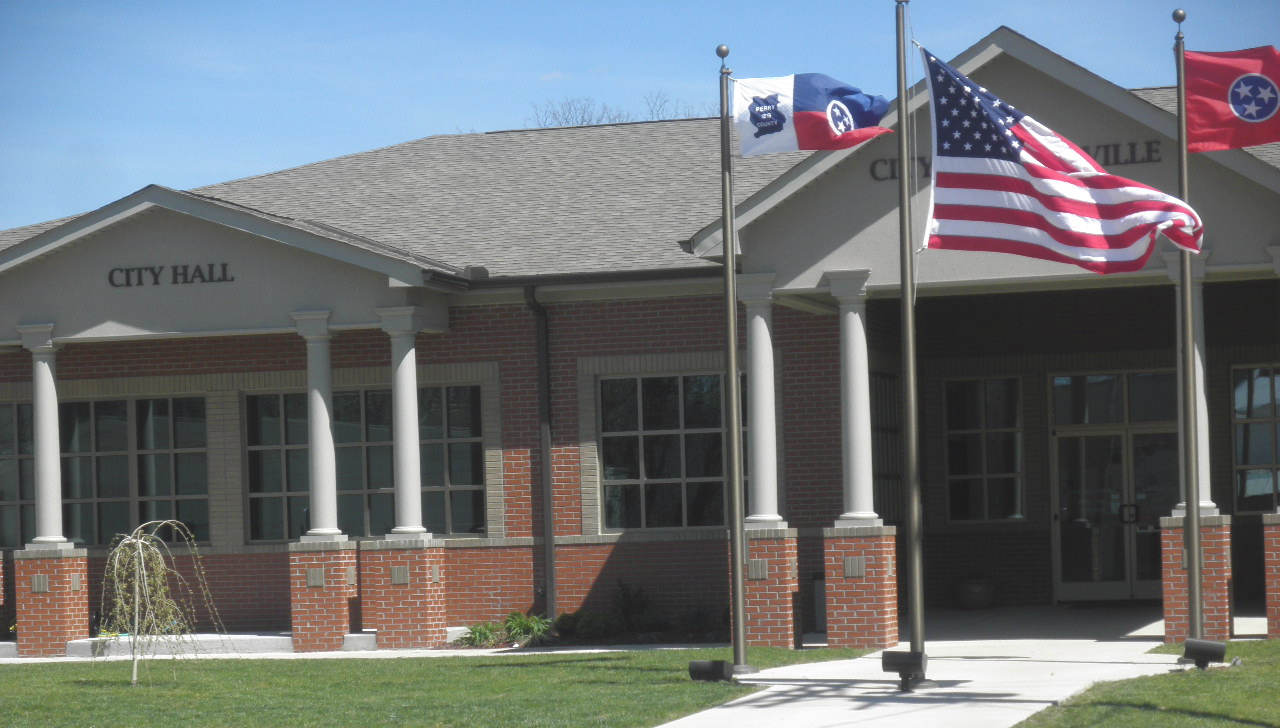
- Lobelville City Hall and Library Building
- Nickname: The Queen City of the Buffalo River
- Location of Lobelville in Perry County, Tennessee.

- Location within the state of Tennessee Lobelville, Tennessee (the United States)
- Coordinates: 35°46′19″N 87°47′02″W
- Country: United States
- State: Tennessee
- County: Perry
- Established: 1854
- Named for: Henri de Lobel, early trader

Area
  - Total: 3.75 sq mi (9.72 km^{2})
  - Land: 3.75 sq mi (9.72 km^{2})
  - Water: 0.0039 sq mi (0.01 km^{2})
- Elevation: 502 ft (153 m)

Population (2020)
  - Total: 919
  - Density: 245.0/sq mi (94.58/km^{2})
- Time zone: UTC-6 (Central (CST))
  - Summer (DST): UTC-5 (CDT)
- ZIP code: 37097
- Area code: 931
- FIPS code: 47-43160
- GNIS feature ID: 1291752
- Website: www.lobelvilletn.org

Lobelville is a city in Perry County, Tennessee, United States that was established as a trading post on the Buffalo River in 1854. As of the 2020 census, Lobelville had a population of 919.

== History ==
Lobelville was established in 1854 by French trader Henri de Lobel. Originally known as Lobelsville, Lobel established a trading post on the Buffalo River in the early 19th century expecting that it would become a trading route. The proximity of the Tennessee River made this an unprofitable venture, and it never took off as a major trading point.

== Geography ==
Lobelville is located at 35°45′4″N 87°47′35″W (35.751119, -87.793085).

According to the United States Census Bureau, the city has a total area of 3.9 square miles (10 km^{2}), of which, 3.9 square miles (10 km^{2}) of it is land and 0.25% is water.

Lobelville now is the site of a major transfer point on the Tennessee Gas Pipeline Company pipeline network, which is also the oldest continuously operating business in the town, beginning operations in 1943. It is bisected by State Route 13, a connector to Interstate 40 (via exit 143 approximately 10 miles (16 km) north in Humphreys County, Tennessee) and U.S. Route 412 approximately 13 miles (21 km) south in Linden. State Route 438 also passes through the southern part of Lobelville.

=== Climate ===
Climate data for Lobelville, Tennessee, 1991–2020 normals, extremes 1997–present
Month	Jan	Feb	Mar	Apr	May	Jun	Jul	Aug	Sep	Oct	Nov	Dec	Year
Record high °F (°C)	75 (24)	80 (27)	87 (31)	91 (33)	93 (34)	107 (42)	105 (41)	106 (41)	100 (38)	99 (37)	86 (30)	78 (26)	107 (42)
Mean maximum °F (°C)	68.1 (20.1)	72.3 (22.4)	80.4 (26.9)	85.9 (29.9)	88.9 (31.6)	94.3 (34.6)	95.8 (35.4)	96.7 (35.9)	92.9 (33.8)	88.3 (31.3)	76.9 (24.9)	70.7 (21.5)	98.3 (36.8)
Mean daily maximum °F (°C)	48.9 (9.4)	54.1 (12.3)	63.1 (17.3)	72.6 (22.6)	79.4 (26.3)	85.6 (29.8)	89.2 (31.8)	88.8 (31.6)	83.3 (28.5)	73.5 (23.1)	61.5 (16.4)	52.6 (11.4)	71.1 (21.7)
Daily mean °F (°C)	37.7 (3.2)	41.7 (5.4)	49.1 (9.5)	58.1 (14.5)	66.5 (19.2)	74.0 (23.3)	77.9 (25.5)	76.7 (24.8)	70.2 (21.2)	59.0 (15.0)	47.9 (8.8)	41.4 (5.2)	58.4 (14.6)
Mean daily minimum °F (°C)	26.4 (−3.1)	29.4 (−1.4)	35.2 (1.8)	43.6 (6.4)	53.5 (11.9)	62.4 (16.9)	66.6 (19.2)	64.7 (18.2)	57.0 (13.9)	44.5 (6.9)	34.3 (1.3)	30.2 (−1.0)	45.7 (7.6)
Mean minimum °F (°C)	9.6 (−12.4)	12.9 (−10.6)	20.5 (−6.4)	29.5 (−1.4)	40.3 (4.6)	51.4 (10.8)	57.5 (14.2)	55.1 (12.8)	45.8 (7.7)	31.1 (−0.5)	20.1 (−6.6)	16.7 (−8.5)	7.9 (−13.4)
Record low °F (°C)	−2 (−19)	3 (−16)	5 (−15)	20 (−7)	35 (2)	44 (7)	53 (12)	42 (6)	37 (3)	25 (−4)	13 (−11)	−2 (−19)	−2 (−19)
Average precipitation inches (mm)	4.42 (112)	5.87 (149)	5.12 (130)	5.54 (141)	5.53 (140)	4.23 (107)	5.19 (132)	3.64 (92)	4.19 (106)	4.57 (116)	3.69 (94)	5.30 (135)	57.29 (1,454)
Average precipitation days (≥ 0.01 in)	8.9	8.8	10.2	9.3	9.5	8.8	8.0	7.4	6.2	6.0	8.0	9.6	100.7
Source 1: NOAA
Source 2: National Weather Service (mean maxima/minima 2006–2020)

== Demographics ==
Historical population
Census	Pop.	Note	%±
1890	171		—
1960	449		—
1970	773		72.2%
1980	993		28.5%
1990	830		−16.4%
2000	915		10.2%
2010	897		−2.0%
2020	919		2.5%

=== 2020 census ===
As of the 2020 census, Lobelville had a population of 919, 378 households, and 290 families. The median age was 38.9 years, with 22.4% of residents under the age of 18 and 18.5% aged 65 or older. For every 100 females there were 101.5 males, and for every 100 females age 18 and over there were 99.7 males age 18 and over.

0.0% of residents lived in urban areas, while 100.0% lived in rural areas.

There were 378 households in Lobelville, of which 28.0% had children under the age of 18 living in them. Of all households, 41.8% were married-couple households, 22.8% were households with a male householder and no spouse or partner present, and 29.4% were households with a female householder and no spouse or partner present. About 32.6% of all households were made up of individuals and 15.1% had someone living alone who was 65 years of age or older.

There were 450 housing units, of which 16.0% were vacant. The homeowner vacancy rate was 0.8% and the rental vacancy rate was 9.6%.

Racial composition as of the 2020 census
Race	Number	Percent
White	861	93.7%
Black or African American	8	0.9%
American Indian and Alaska Native	2	0.2%
Asian	4	0.4%
Native Hawaiian and Other Pacific Islander	0	0.0%
Some other race	5	0.5%
Two or more races	39	4.2%
Hispanic or Latino (of any race)	18	2.0%

=== 2000 census ===
As of the census of 2000, there was a population of 915, with 400 households and 261 families residing in the city. The population density was 232.5 inhabitants per square mile (89.8/km^{2}). There were 464 housing units at an average density of 117.9 per square mile (45.5/km^{2}). The racial makeup of the city was 97.70% White, 0.22% African American, 0.33% Native American, 0.22% Asian, 0.55% from other races, and 0.98% from two or more races. Hispanic or Latino of any race were 0.55% of the population.

There were 400 households, out of which 30.0% had children under the age of 18 living with them, 48.5% were married couples living together, 12.5% had a female householder with no husband present, and 34.8% were non-families. 31.8% of all households were made up of individuals, and 17.0% had someone living alone who was 65 years of age or older. The average household size was 2.29 and the average family size was 2.87.

In the city, the population was spread out, with 24.7% under the age of 18, 5.5% from 18 to 24, 27.5% from 25 to 44, 25.7% from 45 to 64, and 16.6% who were 65 years of age or older. The median age was 39 years. For every 100 females, there were 90.6 males. For every 100 females age 18 and over, there were 84.7 males.

The median income for a household in the city was $26,193, and the median income for a family was $31,389. Males had a median income of $28,750 versus $21,683 for females. The per capita income for the city was $15,549. About 14.3% of families and 19.8% of the population were below the poverty line, including 20.6% of those under age 18 and 12.6% of those age 65 or over.

== Commerce and recreation ==
The Buffalo River provides a substantial income of tourism through canoeing and fishing, as does the larger Tennessee River. Mousetail Landing State Park is situated south-west of Lobelville in Perry County along the Tennessee River. The Buffalo River Country Club is a local 9-hole semi-private golf course. Hunting, fishing, and camping (both at prepared sites and back-country) are widely available in the area.

== Plain community ==
There is a Plain, Old Order community at Cane Creek, Lobelville, called "Believers in Christ" that is different from other Old Order Mennonite and Amish communities in being rather intentional than traditional. It is in some way similar to communities like the "Christian Communities" of Elmo Stoll, the Caneyville Christian Community and the Noah Hoover Mennonites.
