= WMTS-FM =

Radio station in Murfreesboro, Tennessee

- Murfreesboro, Tennessee; United States
- Broadcast area: Middle Tennessee, USA
- Frequency: 88.3 MHz
- Branding: 88.3 WMTS

Programming
- Format: College radio

Ownership
- Owner: Middle Tennessee State University
- Sister stations: WMOT

History
- First air date: 1996; 30 years ago
- Former call signs: WAKF (1995–1995), WNAR [We Need A Radio] (1992)
- Call sign meaning: We're Middle Tennessee State University

Technical information
- Licensing authority: FCC
- Facility ID: 41998
- Class: A
- ERP: 680 watts
- HAAT: 42 meters
- Transmitter coordinates: 35°50′56.00″N 86°21′11.00″W

Links
- Public license information: Public file; LMS
- Webcast: Listen live
- Website: wmts.org

WMTS-FM (88.3 MHz) is a student-run college radio station licensed to Murfreesboro, Tennessee. The station is currently owned by Middle Tennessee State University (MTSU) alongside WMOT (89.5 FM), with studios for both stations located inside the Scott Borchetta College of Media and Entertainment at the John Bragg Media and Entertainment Building on campus on East Main Street. WMTS's transmitter is located just east of the MTSU campus on North Rutherford Road. WMTS went on-air in March 1992 on cable TV Channel 38, the Housing and the Residential Life Channel.

== History ==
In 1992, the signal was moved to MTSU Channel 8 on the local cable system. WMTS worked to obtain Federal Communications Commission (FCC) approval for an FM license and construction permit during this time. With the donation of tower space and a transmitter from WMOT, they hit the FM band on 88.3 MHz in the summer of 1995. The station call-sign was changed to WMTS that fall. 810 WMTS in Murfreesboro donated the call letters.

In August 1995, WMTS began normal operation and broadcast in monaural. During 1996, they went into stereo with processing which increased potential signal coverage and enabled it to sound like other FM stations in the area. It also began constantly broadcasting with a mix of automation and live personalities.

WMTS is now also broadcast on WMOT's HD3 sub-channel.
