= Craig Family Farm =

Historic farm in Tennessee, United States

- U.S. National Register of Historic Places
- Location within Tennessee Location within the United States
- Nearest city: Linden, Tennessee
- Coordinates: 35°40′37″N 87°54′47″W
- Area: 90.5 acres (36.6 ha)
- Built: c. 1871
- Built by: Tapp Craig, McDonald Craig, R. L. Horner, Ralph Ledbetter
- NRHP reference No.: 05001219
- Added to NRHP: April 5, 2006

The Craig Family Farm is a historic African American farm in Perry County, Tennessee near Linden. The farm was established by Tapp Craig in 1871, a formerly enslaved person, as the first Black owned and operated farm in Perry County. The farm has been continuously operated by the Craig family. The farm is recognized as a Tennessee Century Farm.
