= Perry County Courthouse (Tennessee) =

- U.S. National Register of Historic Places
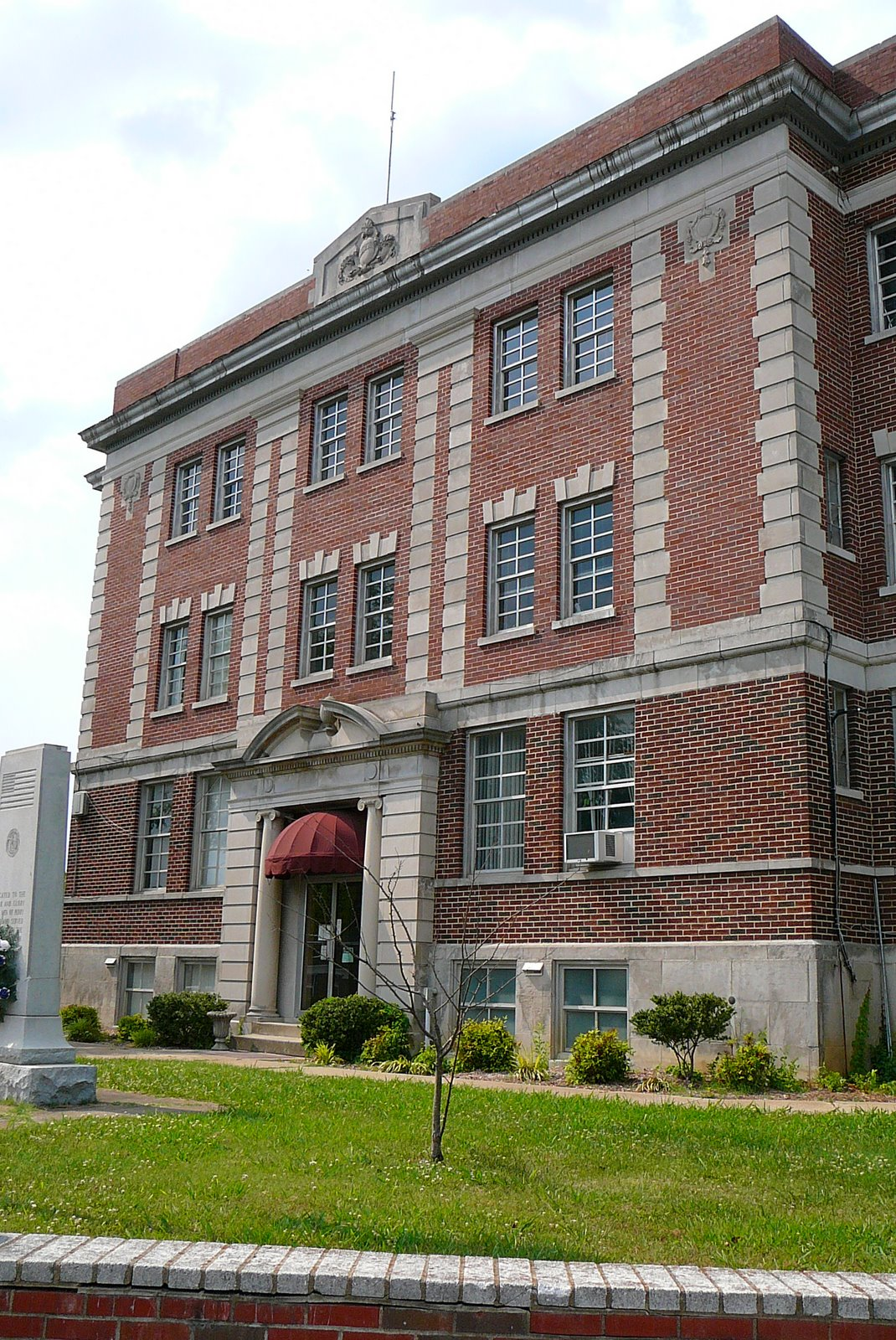

- Location within Tennessee Location within the United States
- Interactive map showing the location of Perry County Courthouse
- Location: Courthouse Square, Linden, Tennessee, United States
- Coordinates: 35°37′1″N 87°50′18″W
- Area: 0.1 acres (0.040 ha)
- Built: 1925
- Architect: Clarence Kelley Colley; Bell Bros. & Co.
- Architectural style: Colonial Revival
- NRHP reference No.: 95000339
- Added to NRHP: March 30, 1995

Perry County Courthouse is a historic courthouse building located at Linden in Perry County, Tennessee, United States. It was built in 1928, having replaced an earlier courthouse that was destroyed by fire.

== History ==
The first courthouse in Linden was a log cabin, built circa 1845, after Decatur County was split off from Perry County and Linden became the county seat. That log courthouse was replaced in 1849-50 by a new two-story wood-frame building. The second courthouse was burned down by Union Army soldiers on May 12, 1863.

The Perry County Courthouse was listed on the National Register of Historic Places in 1995.
