= Wilkinson House (Joelton, Tennessee) =

Historic house in Tennessee, United States

- U.S. National Register of Historic Places
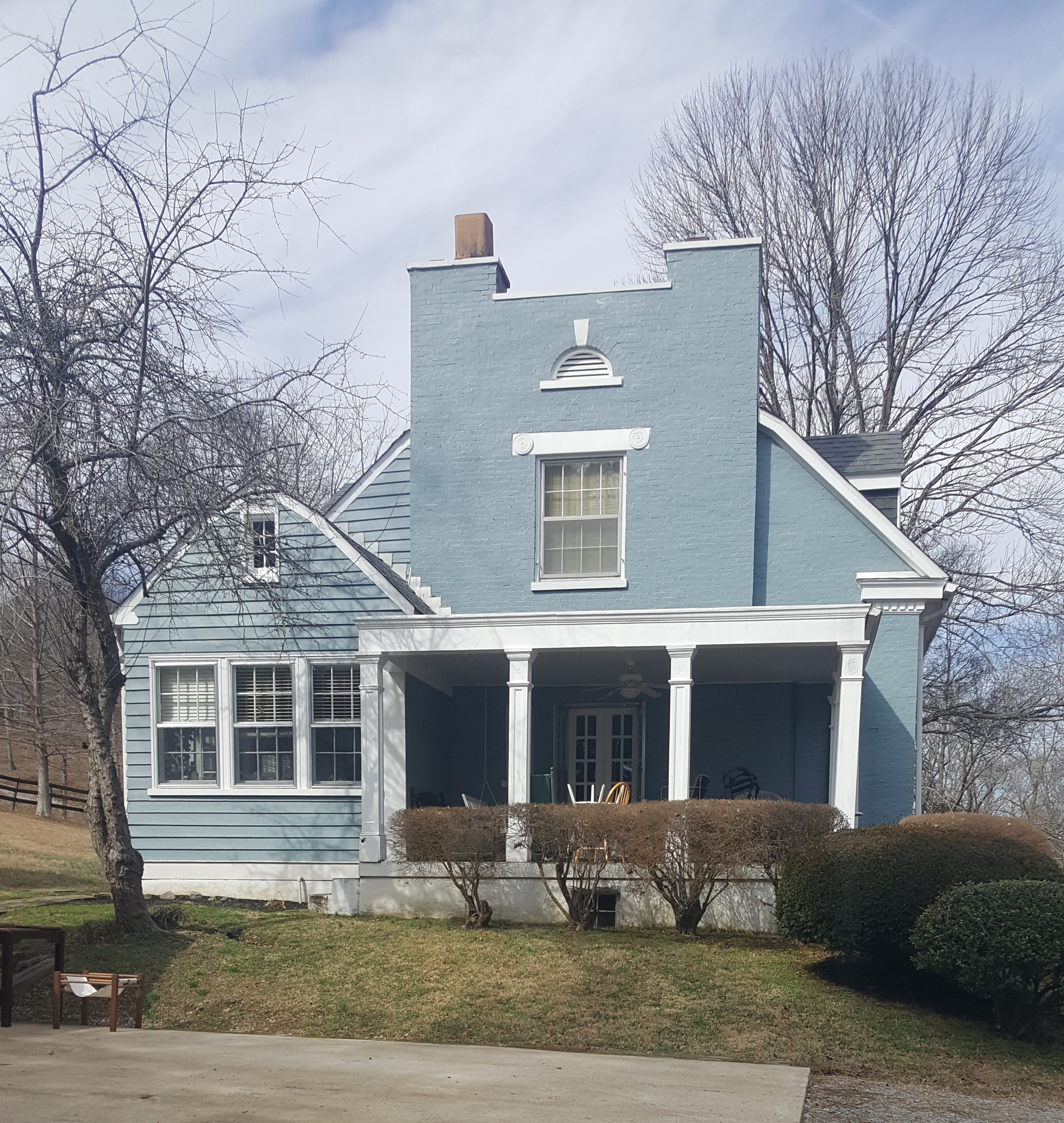

- Location within Tennessee Location within the United States
- Location: 7663 Wilkinson Road, Joelton, Tennessee, U.S.
- Coordinates: 36.3480°N 86.8528°W
- Area: 10 acres (4.0 ha)
- Built: 1932
- Architect: Clarence Kelley Colley
- Architectural style: Dutch Colonial Revival
- NRHP reference No.: 06001095
- Added to NRHP: November 29, 2006

Wilkinson House is a historic house in Joelton, Tennessee, USA.

== History ==
The two-story house was completed in 1932. It was designed by architect Clarence Kelley Colley in the Dutch Colonial Revival architectural style. Colley primarily designed public buildings to include the North Branch Carnegie Library in Nashville and the Perry County Courthouse. Colley also designed buildings located on university campuses, such as MTSU and Austin Peay State University, making the Wilkinson house unique as one of the few residential buildings designed by Colley. It was built in 1932 for Thomas Jefferson Wilkinson, a prominent Joelton resident. The house has served as the Kincer family residence during the last 50 years and three generations.

The interior of the house is largely intact, with few changes being made to the 1932 configuration of the rooms. The kitchen and bathrooms were updated in 1976, with both bathrooms being enlarged by expanding into the closet area of bedrooms. There are three contributing outbuildings on the property, all dating from the period of the construction of the house, the mid-1930s. Directly behind the house is a small gable front concrete-block building with asphalt shingle siding, originally used as a smokehouse and now used for storage. The Wilkinson House represents one of the few Colonial Revival houses constructed in the Joelton area in the first half of the twentieth century, and is the only known Dutch Colonial Revival house in the area. It has seen very few changes in its existence, and the property itself retains integrity as a small "gentleman's farm."

It was sold in the spring of 2018.

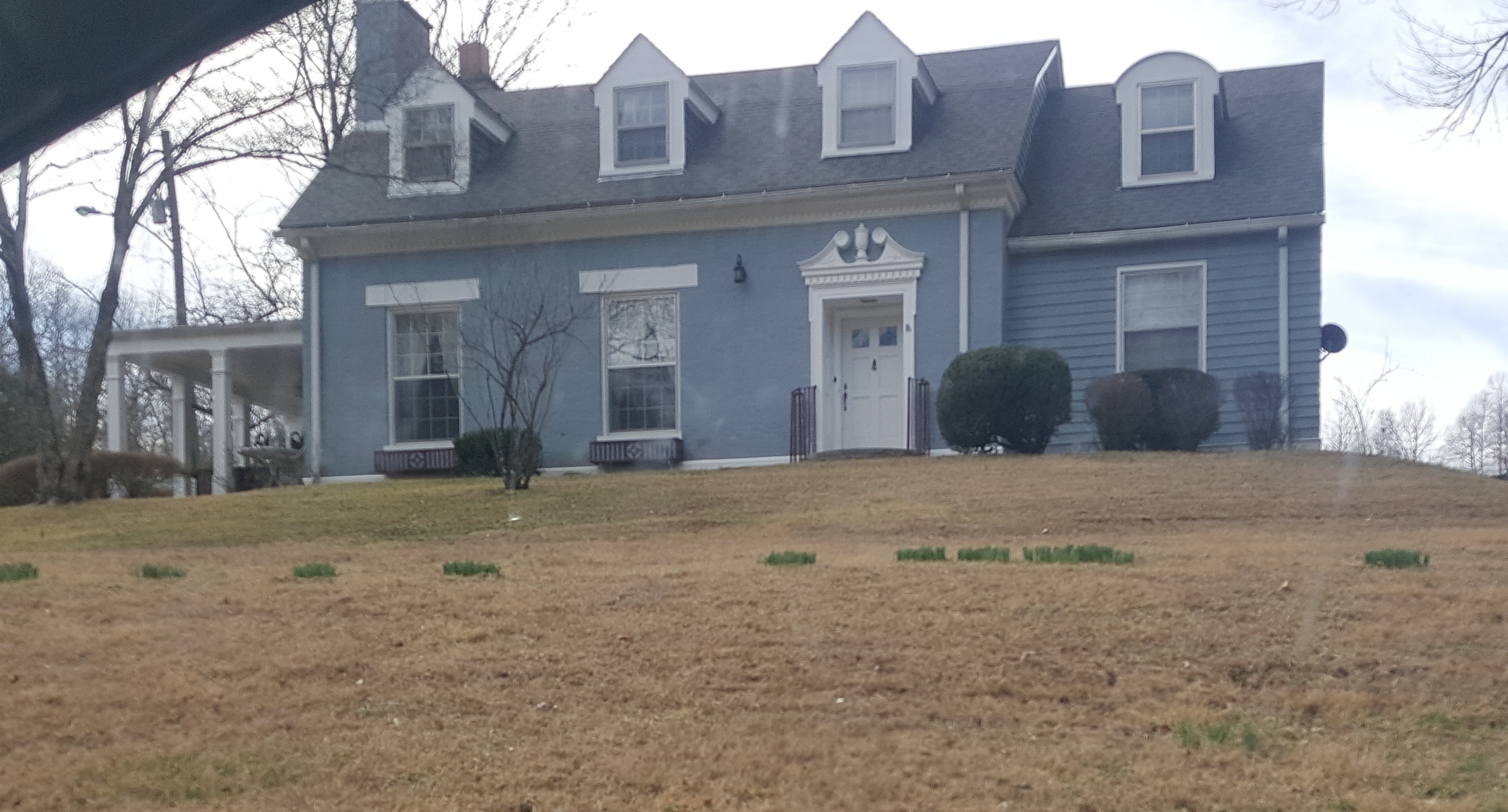

== Architectural significance ==
It has been listed on the National Register of Historic Places since November 29, 2006.
