= WOPC =

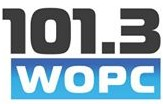
- Linden, Tennessee; United States
- Frequency: 101.3 MHz

Ownership
- Owner: Will Nunley; (Nunley Media Group, LLC)
- Sister stations: WMAK

Technical information
- Licensing authority: FCC
- Facility ID: 190237
- Class: A
- ERP: 2.35 kW
- HAAT: 105.2 meters (345 ft)
- Transmitter coordinates: 35°37′37″N 87°51′29″W

Links
- Public license information: Public file; LMS
- Website: https://wopclive.com

WOPC (101.3 FM) is a radio station licensed to serve Linden, Tennessee, United States. The station is owned by Will Nunley, through licensee Nunley Media Group, LLC.
