= WYGI =

Simulcast of WHPY-FM Bellevue
- Madison, Tennessee; United States
- Broadcast area: Nashville metropolitan area
- Frequency: 1430 kHz
- Branding: Hippie Radio 94.5

Programming
- Format: Classic hits

Ownership
- Owner: Kensington Digital Media, L.L.C.
- Sister stations: WHPY-FM

History
- First air date: September 14, 1958
- Former call signs: WENO (1957–1977); WJRB (1977–1988); WWRB (1988); WRLT (1988–1990); WHNK (1990–1995); WCKD (1995–1996); WMAK (1996–2000); WKDA (2000–2002); WQDQ (2002); WPLN (2002–2023)

Technical information
- Licensing authority: FCC
- Facility ID: 21473
- Class: B
- Power: 10,000 watts (day); 25 watts (night)
- Transmitter coordinates: 36°12′27″N 86°40′23″W

Links
- Public license information: Public file; LMS
- Webcast: Listen live
- Website: hippieradio945.com

WYGI (1430 AM) is a commercial radio station licensed to Madison, Tennessee, United States, and serving the Nashville metropolitan area. WYGI features a classic hits format, simulcasting co-owned WHPY-FM (94.5) as "Hippie Radio"; focusing on the "hippie era" playing the hits of the 1960s, 70s and 80s. They are owned by Kensington Digital Media, L.L.C.

== History ==
=== WENO and WQDQ ===
The station signed on the air on September 14, 1958. Its original call sign was WENO. For its first few decades, WENO was a country music station and a network affiliate of the Mutual Broadcasting System.

It was owned by the Central Broadcasting Company with studios in Nashville. It was considered the first station to play country music during all of the broadcast day, not just at night as the legendary WSM 650 did for many years. AM 1430 went through several ownership, call letter and format changes over the years. It became WQDQ in 2002, simulcasting the news programming of local CBS television affiliate WTVF and its affiliated cable outlet.

=== Nashville Public Radio ===
On April 1, 2002, the station was acquired by Nashville Public Radio. WQDQ became WPLN on April 9, 2002. The station was generally considered to be financially marginal, which is why the frequency was available for sale to the local public radio board, due to lack of interest by potential commercial buyers. Nashville Public Radio was able to put most of its spoken word programs on its AM station, while allowing its FM station, 90.3 WPLN-FM to devote some hours to music programming.

WPLN was part of a trend for large cities to have multiple public radio outlets carrying distinct formats. However, with Nashville Public Radio's purchase of Vanderbilt University student station WRVU and converting it to an all-classical music format as WFCL, WPLN-FM's format was changed on June 8, 2011, to an all-news-and-talk format. (WFCL is now WNXP and changed in 2020 to an adult album alternative format, with classical music moving to a WPLN-FM HD-2 signal.)

The former call sign WPLN originated from Public Library of Nashville, reflecting the original status of public radio in Nashville as a subsidiary of the public library. Although the library and the radio station had developed separate operations and boards of directors well before the addition of the AM station, the FM radio had retained the 'PLN' moniker.

As of March 2020, WPLN was also heard on its sister station WPLN-FM's HD3 channel. From May 2011 until March 2020, it was previously heard on the HD2 subchannel. In 2020, WPLN converted its format to the BBC World Service, broadcasting its programming 24 hours a day, seven days a week. All other programs were dropped.

=== WYGI ===
On September 20, 2022, Nashville Public Radio announced that it was selling WPLN to Kensington Digital Media. WPLN signed off the air at noon on December 22, 2022, in preparation for the sale to Kensington Digital Media.

Kensington announced that it planned to debut a new format after the New Year in 2023 and change the station's call sign to WYGI. The BBC World Service and the WPLN International format continued to be broadcast on the WPLN-FM HD3 subchannel. AM 1430 began simulcasting WHPY-FM 94.5. The call sign change occurred on January 10, 2023.

== See also ==
- List of Nashville media
