= WRVU =

- Nashville, Tennessee; United States
- Broadcast area: Nashville, Tennessee
- Frequencies: 91.1 MHz (1971–2011); 90.3 MHz HD-3 (2011–2014); Internet only (2014–present)

Programming
- Format: Freeform radio

Ownership
- Owner: Vanderbilt Student Communications, Inc.

Links
- Webcast: Listen live
- Website: www.wrvu.org

WRVU is a student-run college radio station associated with, but not operated by, Vanderbilt University in Nashville, Tennessee. It broadcasts via streaming radio, and from 1973 to 2014, it was also broadcast on licensed radio stations in Nashville. The station is operated as a division of Vanderbilt Student Communications (VSC), an independent non-profit affiliated with the university to oversee student media.

== History ==
=== Early stations ===
A clandestine station at Vanderbilt University was set up by student Ken Berryhill around 1951 under the name "the Voice of the Commodore", but was shut down soon after, when the university administration discovered the antenna wire draped around Cole Hall. Berryhill then worked to convince the administration to form a committee for a formal station. After Berryhill was drafted into the Korean War in 1952, the committee gained the support of the university and of commercial station WSM, which donated equipment.

The officially-sanctioned student station went on the air on March 30, 1953. As a very low powered carrier current station, it did not require a license from the Federal Communications Commission FCC) or qualify for official call letters, however it did adopt the self-assigned identifier of "WVU". The FCC told the station that using the campus high-voltage electrical grid as an antenna was causing it to exceed the legal range of an unlicensed station, so it had to re-wire through the campus steam tunnels to multiple buildings and use the low-voltage grid in those buildings to stay legal. The station broadcast at 580 kHz on the AM band.

=== 91.1 ===
WRVU's logo when it was previously located at the Frequency of 91.1 MHz.

Prior to moving to VU's Sarratt Student Center in the 1973, the station for many years broadcast from studios in one of the towers of Neely Auditorium. It was at the Neely Auditorium studio that the station received its first FCC approval to begin broadcasting on 91.1 MHz.

Vanderbilt Student Communications, Inc. applied for a new non-commercial educational FM station construction permit on September 25, 1970; the permit, for 10 watts on 91.1 MHz at Nashville, was granted on January 28, 1971, the callsign WRVU assigned on May 17, 1971, and the full station license issued on August 1, 1973.

An increase to 430 watts was granted by a construction permit in December 1973 and updated license in July 1974. About 1985, WRVU increased power to 14,500 watts, but had been decreased to 10,500 watts by 2003.

VU placed the transmitter on top of the Oxford House building. The station later transmitted from the WSMV tower in West Nashville.

While the station was known as "91 Rock" for many years, WRVU later identified itself using its call letters.

The station earned a devoted following among some Middle Tennessee-area youth during the 1980s and 1990s heyday of the college rock movement. WRVU was the only Nashville outlet for such music (and one of the few in the South, a historically conservative region), at least until bands like R.E.M. and the grunge rock movement achieved mainstream popularity. Rumors arose that the real core audience for the station was not VU students, but rather those in high school who were dissatisfied with traditional rock stations like WKDF, which kept to a standard Album Oriented Rock playlist in the 1980s. No other station in the market truly had as broad a rotation as WRVU, although WRLT made waves in the 1990s with its adult alternative format. That station, however, was aimed at older listeners, and did not really compete with WRVU. However, changing student tastes and concerns about diversity influenced the student station managers to implement a policy in 1995 mandating other programming such as jazz, folk music, blues music, and ethnic (i.e., foreign language) programming, along with more traditionally youth-oriented genres.

=== Transition from 91.1 ===
Developments in technology and social change, though, eventually caught up with WRVU. Beginning in late 2009, VSC's Board of Directors began exploring the sale of the terrestrial radio facilities of the station, due to two factors: demographic research that found that people under 30 were among the least likely people to listen to radio and the most likely to consume music via downloads and Internet streaming, and the increasing desire of public radio licensees to set aside classical music programming onto different frequencies in order to free up airtime for news and talk programming on their main stations, which has become far more popular among audiences than traditional formats such as classical.

Despite the fervent protests of students currently involved with the station and alumni who once had been (supplemented by area musicians whose acts frequently got airplay on the station), VSC decided that an FM radio signal was no longer worth retaining, and that creation of a student media endowment would be a better use of the organization's assets. Nashville Public Radio offered $3.35 million for the license, and VSC agreed to a sale in early June 2011. The terms of the sale included a provision whereby Nashville Public Radio would allow VSC to lease the 90.3 FM HD-3 signal so that WRVU could continue over-the-air broadcasts, along with an agreement to allow Vanderbilt students to intern at Nashville Public Radio.

According to reports, the New Order song Waiting for the Sirens' Call was the final song heard on WRVU at 91.1 FM, at approximately 3 p.m. on June 7, 2011. For the next nine hours, Nashville Public Radio tested the signal for the new WFCL before beginning the new station permanently at midnight.

Beginning on June 7, 2011, WRVU moved to online-only broadcasts. This change followed the execution of an asset purchase agreement and management programming agreement by Vanderbilt Student Communications and Nashville Public Radio, owners of WPLN-FM. Under the purchase agreement, Vanderbilt Student Communications agreed, subject to approval by the Federal Communications Commission, to sell the 91.1 FM license to Nashville Public Radio for the purchase price of $3.35 million. Under the management programming agreement, Nashville Public Radio converted the main broadcast signal into a full-time classical music station, with new call letters of WFCL. On September 1, 2011, WRVU returned to over-the-air broadcasting and was heard on WPLN-FM's HD-3 signal. This continued until May 22, 2014, when WRVU became an internet-only station.

The license for WRVU was set to expire on August 1, 2012. On March 26, 2012, Vanderbilt Student Communications, still the licensee of WRVU, filed an application to renew the license. On July 2, 2012, WRVU Friends & Family, a Nashville-based non-profit organization whose members opposed the sale of the station to Nashville Public Radio, filed a petition to deny renewal of WRVU's license, arguing that Vanderbilt Student Communications did not have the authority to enter into the purchase and programming agreements with Nashville Public Radio; that Vanderbilt Student Communications had breached several FCC Rules and Regulations; and that renewal of the license while the agreements with Nashville Public Radio was not in the public interest. Despite the group's efforts, the FCC proceeded to both renew the license of WFCL and approve the transfer of the license to Nashville Public Radio on March 18, 2014.

While WRVU Friends & Family's efforts to halt the sale of WRVU were unsuccessful, the organization - led by former WRVU DJs - applied for a Nashville FM license of its own. The license was granted, and in 2016, radio station WXNA-LP began broadcasting with much of the same community programming previously heard on the 91.1 FM incarnation of WRVU.

=== After over-the-air broadcasting ===
On May 22, 2014, WRVU ceased broadcasting on WPLN-HD3 and became an internet-only radio station. WPLN replaced WRVU's Programming with XPoNential Radio running full-time. There were not enough radio listeners to justify an HD channel for WRVU and there were more internet listeners. For this reason, WRVU became an internet-only station, ceasing its terrestrial (traditional or analog) broadcast signal.

== Programming ==
Students and others broadcast numerous shows every week on WRVU; most are one to two hours in length. When shows are not being hosted, either because of unfilled time slots or breaks in the academic calendar, WRVU's music stream remains continuous through the use of its autorotation music program, known as "DJ HAL" to students.

WRVU broadcasts 24 hours a day all year long; prior to the mid-1990s, the station shut down operations entirely during the summer and Christmas and New Year's holiday breaks.

The station is run by student volunteers from VU, although in the past, many of its disc jockeys were Vanderbilt alumni or community volunteers. As with most student-operated college stations, its general focus is to play independent-label music. From the 1970s until the mid-2000s (with the sign-on of WRFN-LP), WRVU was practically the only widely accessible outlet for the area's underground music acts to have their recordings get airtime.
