= WNXP =

Public radio station in Nashville

Nashville, Tennessee; United States
- Broadcast area: Nashville
- Frequency: 91.1 MHz
- Branding: 91.one

Programming
- Format: Adult album alternative; eclectic, local artists

Ownership
- Owner: Nashville Public Radio
- Sister stations: WPLN-FM

History
- Former call signs: WRVU (1971–2011); WFCL (2011–2020)
- Call sign meaning: Nashville's Music EXPerience

Technical information
- Licensing authority: FCC
- Facility ID: 69816
- Class: C2
- ERP: 10,000 watts
- HAAT: 212 metres (696 ft)
- Transmitter coordinates: 36°8′27.00″N 86°51′56.00″W

Links
- Public license information: Public file; LMS
- Webcast: Listen live
- Website: wnxp.org

WNXP (91.1 FM) is a public radio station in Nashville, Tennessee, airing an adult album alternative (AAA) radio format. The station is owned by Nashville Public Radio, the licensee of Nashville's main NPR member station, WPLN-FM, with studios for both outlets located on Mainstream Drive north of downtown Nashville. WNXP holds periodic on-air fundraisers to support the station, which is non-commercial.

WNXP has an effective radiated power (ERP) of 10,000 watts. The transmitter is located off Knob Road in Nashville, sharing a tower with WSMV-TV, Nashville's NBC Network affiliate.

== History ==
From 1971 to June 7, 2011, the 91.1 FM frequency was occupied by Vanderbilt University's WRVU, a college radio station (the station changed its call sign to WFCL on June 1, 2011). The university's student communications division made the decision to sell the station, despite public outcry, because of declining student participation and the desire to establish an endowment fund for VU's other student media. Nashville Public Radio, which had long been exploring the possibility of making WPLN-FM a full-time news and talk outlet, decided to purchase WFCL for $3.35 million in order to air the station's classical music library. The FCC approved the purchase and license transfer on March 18, 2014, and the transaction was consummated on May 22, 2014.

On August 12, 2020, Nashville Public Radio announced its plans to move classical music programs to an HD subchannel of WPLN-FM 90.3 and relaunch WFCL in the fall with an undefined "local music" format, which station officials claimed would generate additional financial resources for the group, especially to benefit WPLN-FM's planned expansion of its news operation.

On October 2, 2020, the station changed its call sign to WNXP ahead of the flip. The new station is branded as "Nashville's Music Experience". The new programming began on November 30.
