= Mousetail Landing State Park =

State park in Tennessee, United States

- Interactive map of Mousetail Landing State Park
- Type: Tennessee State Park
- Location: Linden, TN
- Coordinates: 35.6537°N 88.0126°W
- Area: 1,247 acres (505 ha)
- Created: 1986
- Operator: Tennessee Department of Environment and Conservation
- Status: open year round
- Website: Official website

Mousetail Landing State Park is a 1,247-acre (5.05 km^{2}) state park located on the eastern bank of the Tennessee River in Perry County, Tennessee near Linden. The park was established in 1979, making it one of the more recent additions to the Tennessee State Parks system. The name is thought to have been derived from an event during the American Civil War in which a tannery located at a river landing on the site of the present day state park caught fire. The tannery was infested with an unusually large number of mice which fled the burning tannery in the direction of the landing, giving the landing its present name.

The park has 11 miles (18 km) of trails, 24 prepared campsites, a swimming beach, a boat landing, sports fields and courts, an archery range and an enclosed event pavilon. Also located within the park are several archeological ruins, including the original landing pier, a blacksmith shop, and Parrish Cemetery.

Soils in the park have brown silt loam topsoil over brown or red silty clay loam to clay. Chert and gravel commonly occur. The bedrock is limestone with varying amounts of chert and phosphate.

Perry County tourism authorities claim that there are around 250,000 visitors to Mousetail Landing State Park per annum. In 2020, the park reported that campsites were full on most weekends. There were over 3,100 campsite rentals that year, up from 2,149 in 2019. The increase in visitors was probably due to the COVID-19 pandemic encouraging outdoor activity. The park reportedly generated $14.3 million in economic impact to Perry County in 2021.
