= WPLN-FM =

Public radio station in Nashville

- Nashville, Tennessee; United States
- Broadcast area: Nashville metropolitan area
- Frequency: 90.3 MHz (HD Radio)
- Branding: Nashville Public Radio

Programming
- Format: News/talk (Public)
- Subchannels: HD2: Classical music HD3: BBC World Service (Full Time)
- Affiliations: National Public Radio; Public Radio Exchange; BBC World Service

Ownership
- Owner: Nashville Public Radio
- Sister stations: WNXP

History
- First air date: December 17, 1962; 63 years ago
- Call sign meaning: "Public Library of Nashville"

Technical information
- Licensing authority: FCC
- Facility ID: 53821
- Class: C
- ERP: 80,000 watts
- HAAT: 345 meters (1,132 ft)
- Transmitter coordinates: 36°2′8.2″N 86°50′55″W
- Repeaters: 91.7 WHRS (Cookeville); 91.5 WTML (Tullahoma)

Links
- Public license information: Public file; LMS
- Webcast: Listen live
- Website: wpln.org

WPLN-FM (90.3 MHz), is a non-commercial public radio station in Nashville, Tennessee. It airs a news, talk and information radio format and is owned by Nashville Public Radio along with sister station WNXP. The station's studios and offices are located on Mainstream Drive north of downtown Nashville, which are considered among the finest radio production facilities in the U.S. WPLN-FM is simulcast on two low-powered repeaters on the fringes of the Middle Tennessee area: WHRS (91.7 FM) in Cookeville and WTML (91.5 FM) in Tullahoma.

WPLN-FM has an effective radiated power of 80,000 watts. The transmitter is on Johnson Chapel Road West in Brentwood, Tennessee, near the Little Harpeth River. The signal reaches most of Middle Tennessee and some counties in southern Kentucky. WPLN-FM shares the tower with other Nashville FM stations: WRLT, WKDF and WNRQ. It has broadcast from that site since 1984.

== Programming ==
WPLN-FM offers nationally syndicated public radio programs with local news updates. Weekdays feature Morning Edition, All Things Considered, Fresh Air with Terry Gross, 1A, Here and Now and overnight, the BBC World Service. This Is Nashville, a local weekday interview show, is broadcast at noon and repeated at 7 p.m.

Weekends feature hour-long public radio specialty shows, including Wait, Wait, Don't Tell Me!, Snap Judgment, Radio Lab, The New Yorker Radio Hour, Hidden Brain, The Splendid Table, You Bet Your Garden, Freakonomics Radio, TED Radio Hour and Travel with Rick Steves

As is the case with other similarly-formatted NPR affiliates, WPLN-FM only broadcasts music programming on Saturday evenings, with a mixture of folk and alternative rock shows. WPLN-FM broadcasts using HD Radio technology. Its HD-2 digital subchannel offers the BBC World Service and co-owned 91.1 WNXP plays adult alternative music. Nashville Public Radio holds periodic on-the-air fundraisers and seeks donations on its website to support the services.

== History ==
Former logo

=== Nashville Public Library ===
WPLN began as a modest extension of Nashville Public Library. It signed on the air on December 17, 1962. The studios were in the Richland Park library branch on Charlotte Avenue in West Nashville. It broadcast a limited schedule, almost entirely classical music, and only on Mondays through Fridays. The power was limited and the station was only heard in and around the city of Nashville proper. A year later, Nashville and Davidson County merged to form a metropolitan government. The library, and with it WPLN, became an arm of the new structure.

WPLN was one of only a few non-commercial FM licenses held by a public library system in the U.S. In most cases, libraries usually operate radio frequencies only for radio-reading services for the blind and visually impaired, signals that are available only on special receivers.

In 1965, the library moved the station into the then-newly constructed main library downtown. By that time, the station had begun operating a full seven days a week. The station was one of the 73 charter members of National Public Radio in 1970. It was one of the first public radio stations in The South to join the network. The station's website claims it joined NPR in 1968, but this is incorrect; NPR was not founded until two years later.

=== Power boost ===
In 1972, WPLN began broadcasting in stereo and at a full 100,000 watts of power. A "Talking Library" subchannel for blind (and visually impaired) residents of the area began in 1975. Schedule and programming expansion continued at a steady pace throughout the 1980s and 1990s, while WPLN's physical plant did not expand beyond a block of rooms in the library building.

In order to rectify the space shortage and provide more extensive services to the community than was possible under the budgetary and bureaucratic constraints of the public library system, the library board decided, in 1995, to begin proceedings to release the station to an independent community board. The public library relinquished control of WPLN-FM on October 1, 1996, to a group known as "Nashville Public Radio". The station eventually moved out of the library into a modern studio in the Metrocenter area on May 24, 1998.

The success of this move may have prompted the Metropolitan Nashville-Davidson County school system, which operated public television outlet WDCN (channel 8), to follow suit three years later. That station is now WNPT.

In 2002, Nashville Public Radio purchased an existing Medium Wave station to broadcast NPR and local news, talk, and public affairs programs for which the FM did not originally have time on its schedule. The new WPLN-HD2 and HD3 have given Middle Tennessee residents even more choices of music and spoken-word shows. For more information, see WYGI.

In early 2006, WPLN-FM began broadcasting with HD Radio technology. More information is found below.

=== Ending classical music ===
On September 8, 2009, WPLN-FM discontinued its 9 a.m. to 3 p.m. classical music programming in favor of a block of news-and-talk programs from NPR and other providers. That action reflected a trend in medium-sized markets towards orienting public radio schedules in favor of more popular (and perhaps more accessible) political and features programming and away from classical music, whose audiences are aging, according to market researchers.

However, the demand for the spoken-word programs grew to the point that station officials decided to acquire the Vanderbilt University-owned student station WRVU and convert it into a full-time classical music station, WFCL, on 91.1 FM, on June 7, 2011. WPLN thereafter became a full-time news-and-talk station, with feature programming on weekends.

Beginning on November 30, 2020, the classical music on the main channel of 91.1 FM ended. WFCL became WNXP (with the call sign actually having changed in early October) and classical programming was replaced by an eclectic music format, largely revolving around the adult album alternative genre. Classical music moved to the HD-2 signal.

=== Governance ===
WPLN is governed by a self-perpetuating board of directors, with a separate board of local residents who advise the board of directors on the needs of the listening area.

== HD Radio ==
In addition to the main FM channel, WPLN now has two digital multicast stations: 90.3 FM HD-2 and 90.3 FM HD-3.

Initially, 90.3 HD-2 featured primarily classical music and music programs, such as The World Cafe and Echoes. In June 2011, following the launch of Classical 91 One, 90.3 HD-2 switched to carrying time-shifted programming from WPLN's main channel. On May 22, 2014, after WPLN discontinued WRVU from its HD3 channel, and moved XPoNential Radio from its HD2 channel, to broadcasting full-time on its HD3 channel, WPLN replaced its time-shifted programming from WPLN's main channel with a simulcast of its AM sister station, WPLN (1430 AM). XPoNential Radio was previously heard on WPLN HD2 overnights, from 6 p.m. to 6 a.m. As mentioned above, in November 2020, classical music replaced all the previous programming on HD-2, music that was heard since 2011 on the former WFCL.

The HD-3 channel initially carried much of the same programming as WPLN (AM). In June 2011, the HD-3 subchannel was temporarily silenced. On September 1, 2011, at noon, 90.3 HD-3 returned to the air, returning the college alternative format of Vanderbilt University's WRVU to the Nashville airwaves. This lasted until May 22, 2014, when WPLN discontinued WRVU from its HD3 signal (due to low ratings) and replaced it with XPoNential Radio. WRVU's programming is now solely available online, with no terrestrial broadcasting. Beginning in 2020, the simulcast of WPLN (AM) moved to the HD-3 subchannel of WPLN-FM, replacing XPoNential Radio.

These multicast stations can be heard using an HD Radio receiver. 90.3 HD-2 and 90.3 HD-3 can also be streamed on the internet through WPLN's website.

== Simulcasts ==
Call sign	Frequency	City of license	FID	ERP (W)	HAAT	Class	Transmitter coordinates	FCC info
WHRS	91.7 FM	Cookeville, Tennessee	66292	500	117 m (384 ft)	A	36°8′34.2″N 85°28′1.9″W	LMS
WTML	91.5 FM	Tullahoma, Tennessee	94201	1,550	82 m (269 ft)	A	35°23′53.3″N 86°8′40″W	LMS
