= WHPY-FM =

Radio station

- Bellevue, Tennessee; United States
- Broadcast area: Nashville metropolitan area
- Frequency: 94.5 MHz
- Branding: Hippie Radio 94.5

Programming
- Format: Classic hits

Ownership
- Owner: Kensington Digital Media
- Sister stations: WYGI

History
- First air date: October 1974
- Former call signs: WPCT (1974–1983); WIST (1983–1994); WFGZ (1994–2012)
- Former frequencies: 94.3 MHz (1974–1995)
- Call sign meaning: Hippie

Technical information
- Licensing authority: FCC
- Facility ID: 50126
- Class: A
- ERP: 6,000 watts
- HAAT: 100 meters (330 ft)
- Transmitter coordinates: 36°04′40.00″N 87°01′37.00″W
- Repeater: 1430 WYGI (Madison)

Links
- Public license information: Public file; LMS
- Webcast: Listen live
- Website: hippieradio945.com

WHPY-FM (94.5 FM) is a commercial radio station licensed to Bellevue, Tennessee, United States, and serving the Nashville metropolitan area. Owned by Kensington Digital Media, it simulcasts a classic hits format with WYGI in Madison, known as "Hippie Radio". WHPY-FM's transmitter is sited on McCrory Lane in Nashville, near Interstate 40.

== History ==
The station signed on the air in October 1974 as WPCT. It broadcast at 94.3 FM and featured a country music format. WPCT was licensed at the time to Jackson, Tennessee.

The station continued with country music until November 28, 2003, when it was sold to Grace Broadcasting, which flipped formats to Christian radio. In between those times, the station changed its call sign to WIST in 1983 and WFGZ in 1994.

It was announced on December 13, 2011, that Grace Broadcasting would sell the station to Kensington Digital Media. The sale was finalized on January 3, 2012. The station was relocated from Jackson to the Nashville area. Its new city of license was Bellevue, Tennessee, a Nashville neighborhood.

The station switched its call letters to WHPY-FM to stand for the word "hippie." It changed its format to classic hits, branded as "Hippie Radio 94.5". WHPY-FM broadcasts music from the "hippie era." Most of its playlist received airplay on Top 40 stations from the 1960s through the 1980s.

== Notable DJs ==
Spider Harrison
