= Linden, Tennessee =

Linden
- Town
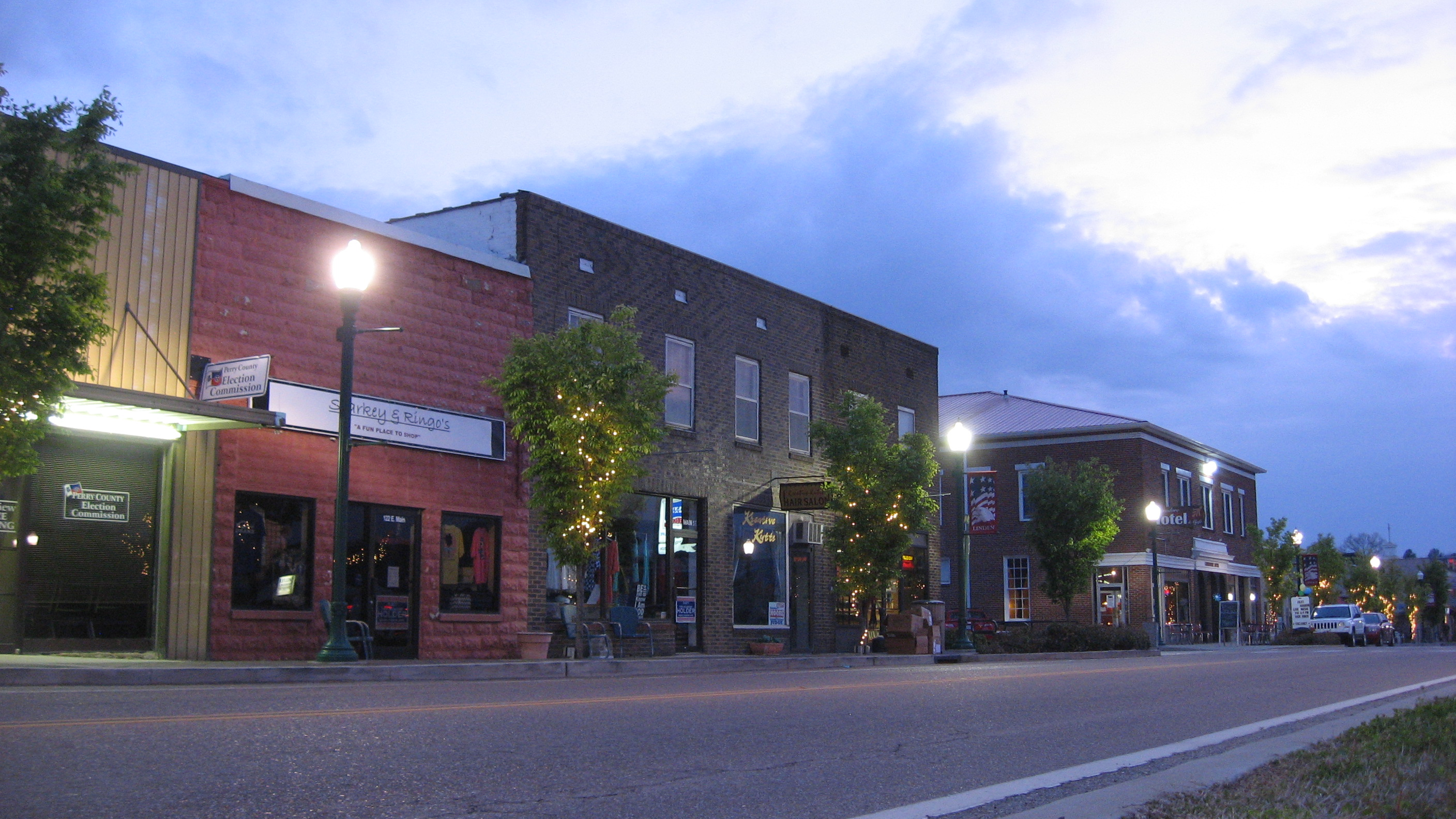
- Linden courthouse square

- Location of Linden in Perry County, Tennessee.

- Location within the state of Tennessee Linden (the United States)
- Coordinates: 35°36′44″N 87°50′30″W
- Country: United States
- State: Tennessee
- County: Perry
- Incorporated: 1850
- Named for: "Hohenlinden", poem by Thomas Campbell

Area
  - Total: 1.00 sq mi (2.60 km^{2})
  - Land: 1.00 sq mi (2.60 km^{2})
  - Water: 0 sq mi (0.00 km^{2})
- Elevation: 568 ft (173 m)

Population (2020)
  - Total: 997
  - Density: 992.4/sq mi (383.18/km^{2})
- Time zone: UTC−6 (Central (CST))
  - Summer (DST): UTC−5 (CDT)
- ZIP code: 37096
- Area code: 931
- FIPS code: 47-42720
- GNIS feature ID: 1291316
- Website: https://www.townoflindentn.gov/

Linden is a town in and the county seat of Perry County, Tennessee, United States. As of the 2020 census, Linden had a population of 997. Linden was officially incorporated in 1850.

Linden is served by Perry County Airport, located 3.5 miles to the southwest.

Linden is named after the Thomas Campbell poem, "The Battle of Hohenlinden." Linden, Texas was in turn then named after the Tennessee town.

On September 1, 1930, the central part of the city was largely destroyed by a fire.

== Geography ==
Linden is located at 35°36′44″N 87°50′30″W (35.612168, -87.841601).

According to the United States Census Bureau, the town has a total area of 1.0 square mile (2.6 km^{2}), all of it land.

=== Climate ===
Climate data for Linden, Tennessee (1991–2020 normals, extremes 1962–present)
Month	Jan	Feb	Mar	Apr	May	Jun	Jul	Aug	Sep	Oct	Nov	Dec	Year
Record high °F (°C)	76 (24)	82 (28)	89 (32)	92 (33)	96 (36)	104 (40)	105 (41)	105 (41)	101 (38)	97 (36)	93 (34)	88 (31)	105 (41)
Mean daily maximum °F (°C)	48.6 (9.2)	53.2 (11.8)	62.6 (17.0)	72.0 (22.2)	78.7 (25.9)	85.1 (29.5)	88.7 (31.5)	88.5 (31.4)	83.3 (28.5)	73.2 (22.9)	61.4 (16.3)	51.9 (11.1)	70.6 (21.4)
Daily mean °F (°C)	37.5 (3.1)	41.2 (5.1)	49.3 (9.6)	58.1 (14.5)	66.4 (19.1)	74.0 (23.3)	77.8 (25.4)	76.9 (24.9)	70.5 (21.4)	59.0 (15.0)	48.3 (9.1)	40.7 (4.8)	58.3 (14.6)
Mean daily minimum °F (°C)	26.5 (−3.1)	29.2 (−1.6)	36.1 (2.3)	44.2 (6.8)	54.1 (12.3)	62.9 (17.2)	67.0 (19.4)	65.4 (18.6)	57.8 (14.3)	44.9 (7.2)	35.2 (1.8)	29.6 (−1.3)	46.1 (7.8)
Record low °F (°C)	−18 (−28)	−10 (−23)	6 (−14)	19 (−7)	30 (−1)	36 (2)	46 (8)	41 (5)	35 (2)	21 (−6)	6 (−14)	−8 (−22)	−18 (−28)
Average precipitation inches (mm)	4.60 (117)	4.91 (125)	4.93 (125)	5.64 (143)	6.36 (162)	5.31 (135)	5.06 (129)	3.20 (81)	4.20 (107)	3.82 (97)	3.89 (99)	5.67 (144)	57.59 (1,463)
Average snowfall inches (cm)	0.9 (2.3)	0.7 (1.8)	0.4 (1.0)	0.0 (0.0)	0.0 (0.0)	0.0 (0.0)	0.0 (0.0)	0.0 (0.0)	0.0 (0.0)	0.0 (0.0)	0.0 (0.0)	0.1 (0.25)	2.1 (5.3)
Average precipitation days (≥ 0.01 in)	9.0	8.5	9.0	8.7	9.4	8.2	8.2	6.8	6.5	7.1	7.9	9.1	98.4
Average snowy days (≥ 0.1 in)	0.3	0.4	0.2	0.0	0.0	0.0	0.0	0.0	0.0	0.0	0.0	0.0	0.9
Source: NOAA

== Demographics ==
Historical population
Census	Pop.	Note	%±
1870	149		—
1880	189		26.8%
1890	330		74.6%
1930	539		—
1940	641		18.9%
1950	854		33.2%
1960	1,086		27.2%
1970	1,062		−2.2%
1980	1,087		2.4%
1990	1,099		1.1%
2000	1,015		−7.6%
2010	908		−10.5%
2020	997		9.8%

=== 2020 census ===
Linden racial composition
Race	Number	Percentage
White (non-Hispanic)	847	84.95%
Black or African American (non-Hispanic)	73	7.32%
Native American	4	0.4%
Asian	12	1.2%
Other/Mixed	41	4.11%
Hispanic or Latino	20	2.01%

As of the 2020 United States census, there were 997 people, 468 households, and 257 families residing in the town.

=== 2000 census ===
As of the census of 2000, there were 1,015 people, 400 households, and 233 families residing in the town. The population density was 1,040.9 inhabitants per square mile (401.9/km^{2}). There were 461 housing units at an average density of 472.8 per square mile (182.5/km^{2}). The racial makeup of the town was 93.0%White, 5.52% African American, 0.49% Native American, 0.20% Asian, and 0.49% from two or more races. Hispanic or Latino of any race were 0.39% of the population.

There were 400 households, out of which 26.3% had children under the age of 18 living with them, 44.0% were married couples living together, 12.3% had a female householder with no husband present, and 41.8% were non-families. 37.5% of all households were made up of individuals, and 24.0% had someone living alone who was 65 years of age or older. The average household size was 2.25 and the average family size was 2.97.

In the town, the age distribution of the population shows 22.6% under the age of 18, 6.6% from 18 to 24, 21.3% from 25 to 44, 19.6% from 45 to 64, and 30.0% who were 65 years of age or older. The median age was 45 years. For every 100 females, there were 76.2 males. For every 100 females age 18 and over, there were 69.8 males.

The median income for a household in the town was $25,134, and the median income for a family was $31,000. Males had a median income of $24,500 versus $21,063 for females. The per capita income for the town was $19,410. About 16.8% of families and 23.9% of the population were below the poverty line, including 27.5% of those under age 18 and 23.1% of those age 65 or over.

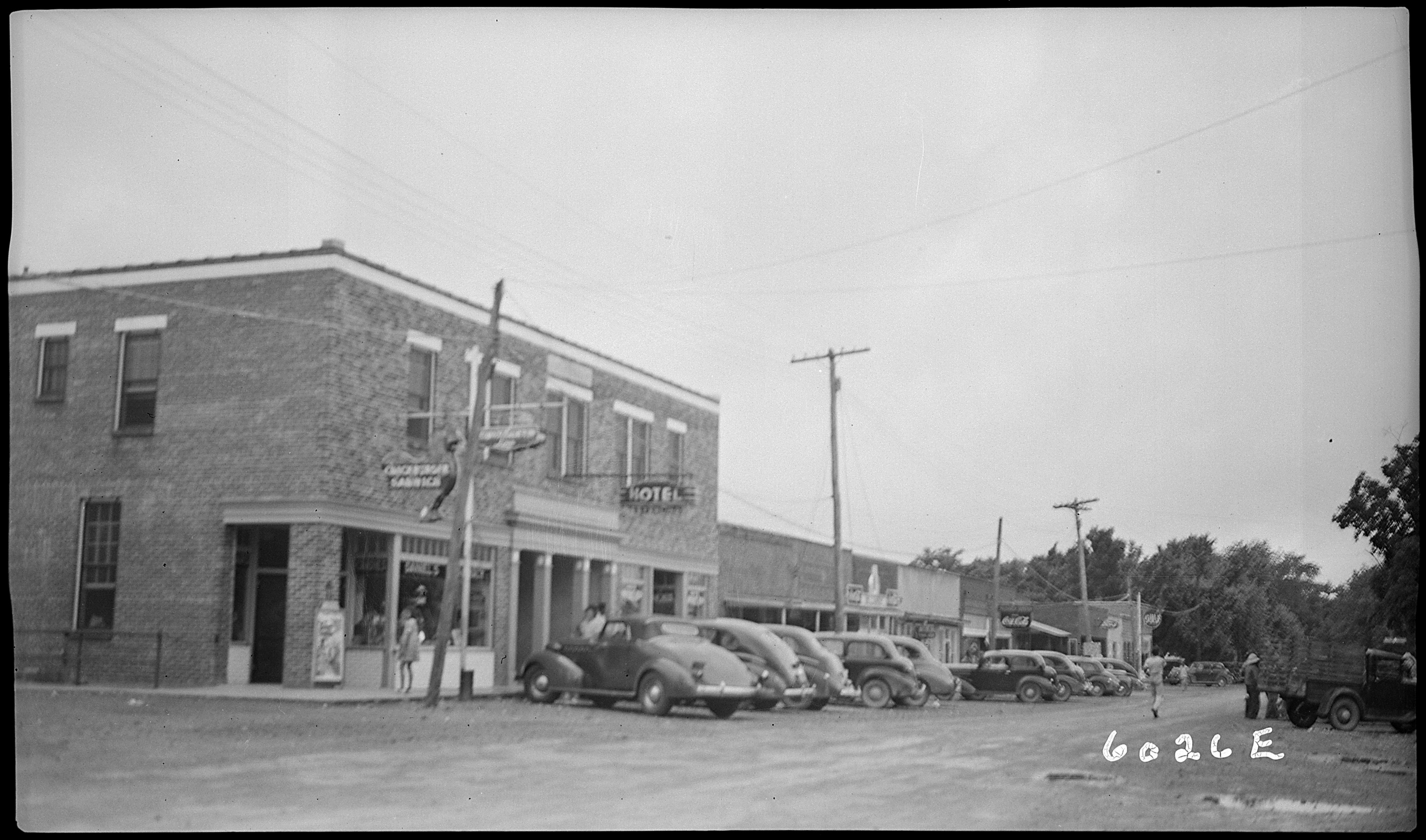
Downtown Linden, Tennessee in 1940 showing the hotel and a Gulf oil station.

== Notable people ==
- Bob Harris (basketball) – a professional basketball player with the Fort Wayne Pistons and Boston Celtics.
- Clyde Milan – an outfielder with the Washington Senators from 1907 to 1922.
- Horace Milan – a Washington Senators baseball player who played outfield from 1915 to 1917.

== See also ==
- WOPC
- Perry County Courthouse (Tennessee)
